= Armeno-Sasanian Wars of 363–371 =

Armenian-Sasanian War
- Part of the Perso-Armenian Wars and the Roman-Persian wars
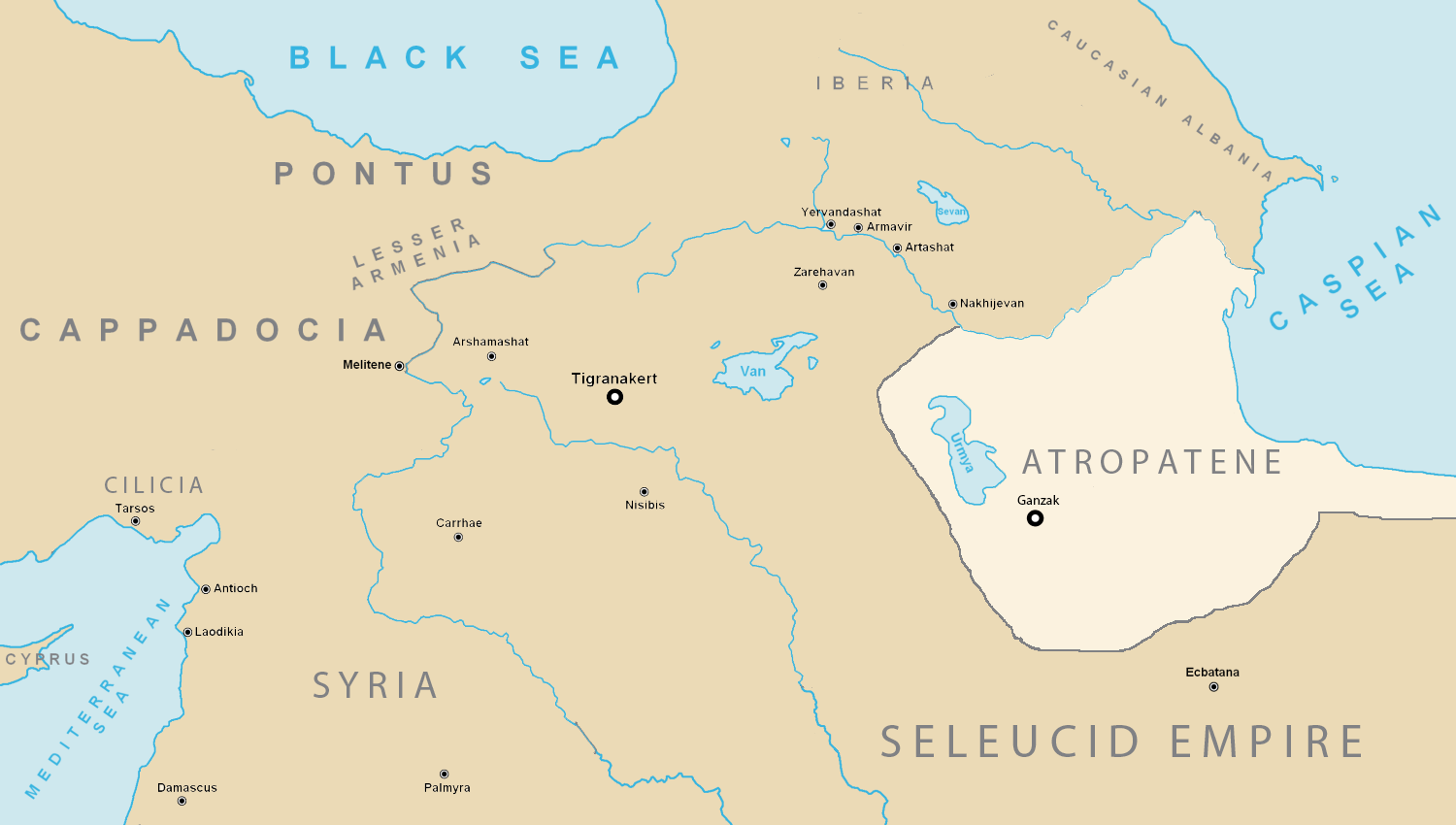
- Map of Atropatene and Armenia
Date	c. 363–371 AD
Location	Armenia, Atropatene, northwestern Iran
Result	Armeno-Roman victory
Territorial changes	Reconquest of some of the lost Armenian territories by Musegh I (Note: The extent of Musegh I's reconquest of the Armenian territories is not certain and is probably exaggerated by Faustus. He named the following territories among those recaptured: part of Azerbaijan (Caucasian Albania), Nova Siriganica, the districts of Corduena, Codritom and Tamoritis in Gordiene, the provinces of Gogarena, Caspiana and Arzanene, the districts of Sacasena and Gardman in Otena, the district of Coltena in Artisaquena, and the principalities of Sofanene, Ingilene and Antzitene in Armenia IV. Manandian rules out the reconquest of Arzanene and Corduena (which had been ceded to Persia by Rome in 363), as well as the capture of Sofanene, Ingilene and Antzitene, which had been annexed by Rome. Chaumont also considers the reconquest of Caucasian-Albanian territories, like Orchisthenes, Otena, Sacasena, Gardman and Coltena, unlikely.); Re-establishment of the Arshakuni king Pap of Armenia

Belligerents
Arshakuni dynasty of Armenia; Roman Empire	Sasanian Empire; Kingdom of Albania

Commanders and leaders
Mushegh I Mamikonian; Vasak I Mamikonian (executed); Bagoas Mamikonian †; Arshak II †; Parandzem (executed); Manuel Mamikonian; Terentius (Note: At the command of twelve Roman legions.); Vadomarius; Arintheus; Smbat II Bagratuni; Pap of Armenia	Shapur II (WIA); Urnayr of Albania (WIA); Meruzhan Artsruni †; Andikān †; Hazaravukht †; Surena; Vahan Mamikonyan †

The Armeno-Sasanian Wars of 363–371 were a series of conflict between the Arsacid faction of the Kingdom of Armenia and the Sasanian Empire, led by shahanshah Shapur II.

== Historial context ==
In 359 AD, another Roman-Persian war began, which ended with the defeat of Rome. Julian, the Roman emperor at the time, was killed by a Sasanian kontophoroi cavalry spearmen. The next emperor, Jovian, did not continue the war and signed a treaty with Persia. According to this treaty, the 5 southern Armenian provinces, along with 15 fortresses and cities, were to pass under the rule of the Persians. This treaty signed by Rome was called "shameful" by the 4th-century Roman historian Ammianus. This treaty allowed the Persian "king of kings" (Shahanshah) Shapur II to freely implement his plans for Greater Armenia.

== War ==
=== Siege of Artogerassa, 368 AD ===
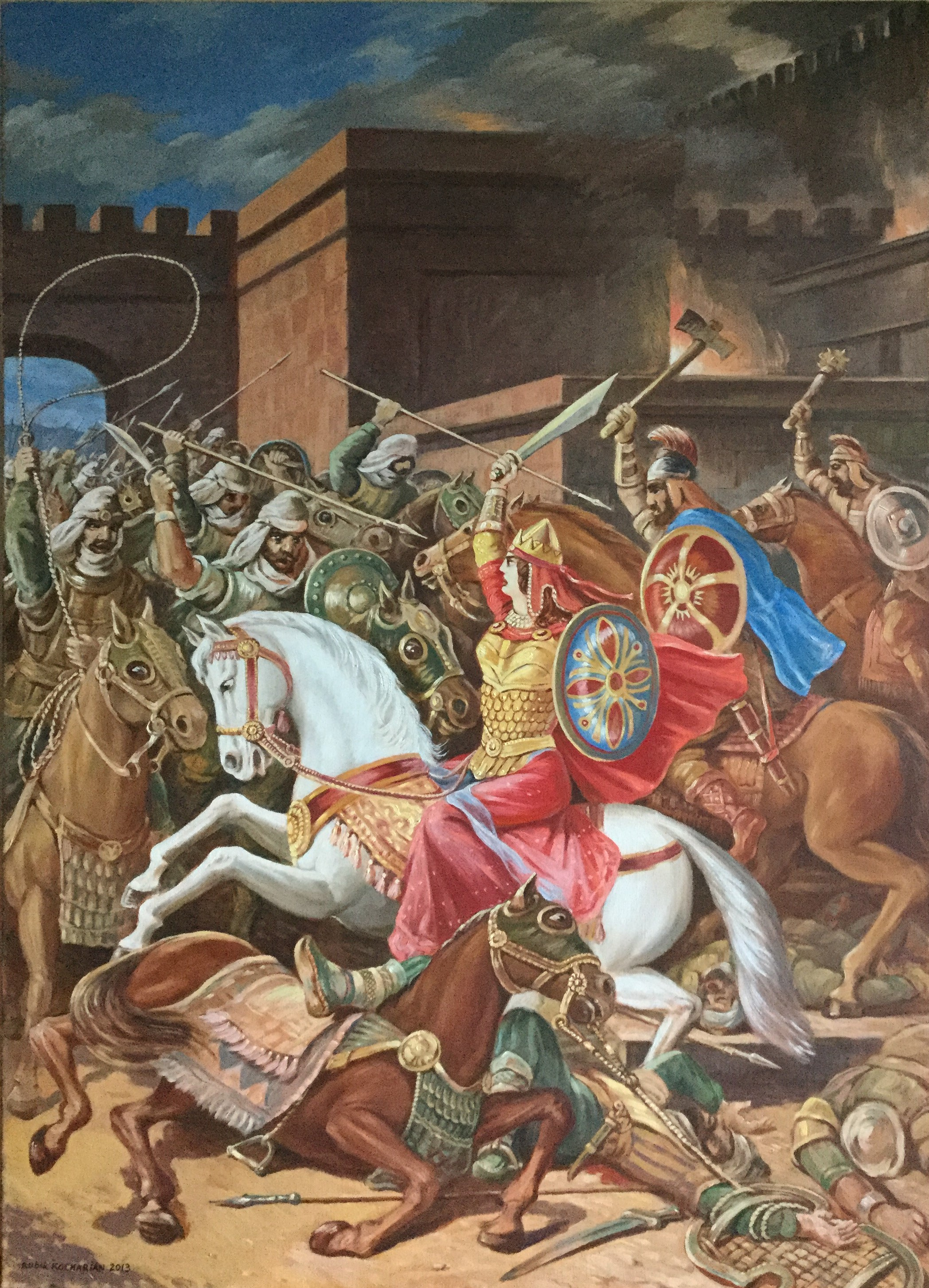
Last Battle of Queen Pharandzem, by Rubik Kocharian, 2013

By carefully calculated flattery mingled with perjury Shapur, tricked King Arsaces; for after being invited to a banquet he was taken according to orders to a secret rear-door; there after his eyes had been gouged out, he was bound in silver chains, which among that people is regarded as a consolation, though an empty one, for the punishment of men of rank, and then he was banished to a fortress called Agabana, where after being tortured he was slain by the penal steel. After sending Pap to safety in Roman Cappadocia, Parandzem manned the watchtowers every night at Artogerassa in the Caucasus Mountains on the Aras River and brandished torches to show her resolve. Meanwhile, the siege of Artogerassa continued, and the Epic Histories inform us that Pap, in "the land of the Greeks," was in communication with his mother inside the fortress, whom he encouraged to await his rescue, Unfortunately for Parandzem, Valens was willing to intervene and reimpose Pap only in 369. The clash ended in 368 in epidemic and hunger that wiped out most of Queen Parandzem's army made up of 11,000 men and forced her surrender, taking over a thousand people and the Queen herself captive. After the siege Shapur ravages Armenia in retaliation of the ally with Rome, Shapur destroyed Artaxata, the Armenian capital, after that Shapur blockaded Artogerassa with the whole weight of his forces and after some battles of varying result and the exhaustion of the defenders, forced his way into the city and set it on fire, dragging out and carrying off the wife and the treasures of Arsaces. Shapur II wanting to humiliate Armenia and the Roman Empire, had Parandzem given to his soldiers whom they brutally raped until she died.

=== Battle in Bagrevand, 371 AD ===
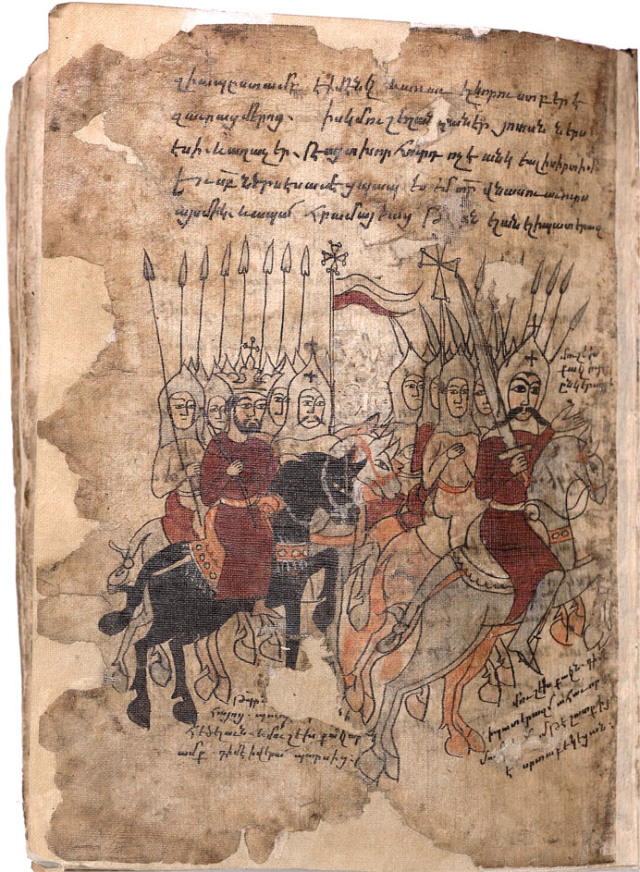
16th-century Armenian miniature depicting the battle

The combined Armenian-Roman army, amounting up to 90,000 men, met the invading Sassanid force near Bagavan. According to Ammianus Marcellinus, the Romans initially withdrew to avoid combat, but were eventually forced to respond to the attacks of the Persian cavalry and won a decisive victory in the subsequent battle, inflicting heavy casualties on the Persians. Faustus of Byzantium gives considerable credit for the victory to sparapet Mushegh I Mamikonian. Faustus also tells of how Urnayr of Albania asked Shapuh to let his contingent face the Armenian force, and how Mushegh engaged in single combat with Urnayr and wounded the Albanian king, but allowed him to escape with his life. This may indicate that the battle took place in a similar fashion as other battles where the Romans and their allies faced the Persians and their allies, with the Romans facing the Persians and the allies fighting each other. According to Faustus, King Pap did not take part in the battle and observed from Mount Npat together with Patriarch Nerses at the request of the Roman generals.

== Aftermath ==
Ammianus (29.1.4) writes that several more engagements were fought after the Armeno-Roman victory at Bagavan, with varying results. Faustus tells of another major Battle at Ganzak in Azerbaijan, where the Armenians and Romans defeated the Persians again, this time with Shapur leading in person, who sustained a light wound caused by fighting. After these battles, Shapur sent emissaries and a truce was agreed. Shapur then returned to Ctesiphon and Valens to Antioch, with Armenia effectively under Roman suzerainty. The truce would last for seven years. As a result of these victories, Mushegh is said to have reconquered many lost Armenian territories and forced the nobles who had revolted against the Arsacid monarchy to submit to the authority of Pap.

== Sources ==
- Faustus of Byzantium (1989). Garsoïan, Nina (ed.). The Epic Histories Attributed to Pʻawstos Buzand: (Buzandaran Patmutʻiwnkʻ). Cambridge, Massachusetts: Department of Near Eastern Languages and Civilizations, Harvard University Press. ISBN 978-0-674-25865-5.
- Manandian, Hakob (1957). Kʻnnakan tesutʻyun hay zhoghovrdi patmutʻyan, hator B, masn A [Critical theory of the history of the Armenian people, volume II, part I]. Yerevan: Haypethrat.
- Leo (1917). Հայոց Պատմություն [Armenian history]. Vol. 1. Yerevan: "Hayastan" publishing house.
- Kurkjian, Vahan (1958). A History of Armenia. Armenian General Benevolent Union of America.
- Lenski, Noel Emmanuel (2002). Failure of Empire: Valens and the Roman State in the Fourth Century A.D. University of California Press. ISBN 978-0-520-23332-4.
- "Our Victories", Volume B. Yerevan: "Noravank" publishing house. 2009.
- Hughes, Ian (2013). Imperial Brothers: Valentinian, Valens and the Disaster at Adrianople. Pen & Sword. ISBN 978-1848844179.
