= Tirit of Armenia =

- Տիրիթ Արշակունի
- Born: flourished 4th century
- Died: 359; Basean
- Title: Prince of Armenia
- Father: Artaxias
- Family: Arsacid dynasty of Armenia
- Honours: great Arsacid sepuh or mec sepuhn Arsakuni

Tirit also known as Tirid (flourished 4th century, died 359) was a prince from the Arsacid dynasty of Armenia.

== Origin ==
Tirit was the son born to Artaxias by a mother whose name is unknown, hence his paternal uncle was Arsaces II (Arshak II) who ruled as Roman client King of Armenia from 350 until 368 and was a grandson to the previous ruling Armenian client king Tiran (Tigranes VII) who ruled from 339 until 350․

== Biography ==
=== Early Years and Captivity ===
Tirit was most likely born and raised during the reign of Tiran. His father died during Tiran’s reign, though the exact date is unknown. When Emperor Julian the Apostate launched a campaign against the Persians and, passing through Cilicia, reached Mesopotamia, King Tiran went to meet him, attacked the Persian troops, put them to flight, and provided assistance by ferrying Julian and his entire army across the Euphrates River.

Tiran appealed to the Emperor with a request not to take him along to Persia, citing his inability to ride a horse. Julian agreed but demanded an army and hostages from him. According to Khorenatsi, Tiran, sparing his second son Arshak, gave up Trdat his third son along with his wife and sons, as well as his grandson Tirit, the son of his deceased firstborn Artaxerxes. Julian immediately sent them to Byzantium, while allowing Tiran to return to Armenia.

Tirit, along with his cousin Gnel, was later released by the Emperor and sent to Armenia. Emperor Constantius II pursued far-reaching goals. Khorenatsi writes that as compensation for the unjust killing of Trdat, he honored his son Gnel with the rank of consul and granted him great wealth. Supposedly for this reason, Tirit, becoming jealous of Gnel, was filled with malice against him, waiting for an opportune day.

In reality, granting Gnel the consular title was by no means accidental and was not related to the murder of his father Trdat. The calculation was very subtle. Since Arshak had no son, Tirit—the son of Tiran’s deceased firstborn Artaxerxes—was the legitimate heir to the throne. Consequently, by sending them to Armenia, the Emperor not only turned them into Roman agents but also sowed, if not enmity, then at least coldness between the cousins. This ensured that if Rome decided to elevate one of them to the Armenian throne, both would remain loyal to the Empire independently of each other. In essence, by sending the Arsacids Gnel and Tirit to Armenia, the Emperor planted a "time bomb" in the country.

=== Parandzem ===
Gnel, Tirit's cousin, married a noble Armenian woman named Parandzem from the Siunia dynasty. Parandzem was famous for her beauty and modesty. Her fame spread so widely that Tirit fell passionately in love with her and desired to take her as his wife.

== Dispute with Gnel ==
After his return, Gnel enjoyed great popularity among the nobility. Movses Khorenatsi asserts that this fame sparked envy in Tirit, who began seeking ways to plot against him.

Faustus the Byzantine, in turn, notes that Tirit was enchanted by the beauty of Parandzem, Gnel's wife, and desired to take her as his wife:

All the magnates, nakharars, and nobles love Gnel; the nakharars of our entire country desire to have him as their sovereign more than you. Therefore, know this, O King, and consider what you must do and how to preserve your life.

In both accounts, Tirit (according to Movses Khorenatsi, along with the royal armor-bearer Vardan I) provided Arshak with false information regarding Gnel:

"Do you not know that Gnel has plotted to kill you and reign in your stead? Observe, O Sovereign, the remarkable circumstance that Gnel has settled in Ayrarat, in our royal estates, and the hearts of all the nakharars have inclined toward him. All of this is the work of the Emperors, who bestowed upon him the consular rank and abundant treasures, with which he has enticed the nakharars." Vardan, swearing by the King's sun, said: "I heard with my own ears Gnel saying: I shall not fail to avenge my uncle for the death of my father, which occurred through his fault."

== Plot Against Gnel ==
Having found a way to initiate a treacherous plot against his cousin Gnel, Tirit began to devise cunning ploys. He told Arshak: "Gnel himself wants to reign and kill you. All the magnates, nakharars, and nobles love Gnel; the nakharars of our entire country desire to have him as their sovereign more than you. Therefore, know this, O King, and consider what you must do and how to preserve your life." Believing Tirit's words, Arshak II ordered the murder of Gnel.

From then until Gnel's death, Arshak II harbored animosity toward him, as Gnel had supposedly often tried to pursue him and had long plotted treason against him.

During this time, Gnel and his wife were in hiding from their uncle. Arshak II eventually killed Gnel during the festival of Navasard (which took place in August), having deceived his nephew and his wife into coming to Shahapivan—the main Arshakuni camp located near a fenced hunting preserve at a horse racing track. The deception lay in the claim that Arshak II supposedly wanted to reconcile with Gnel.

Gnel was captured by the soldiers of Arshak II, taken to the nearby Mount Lsin, and executed. After Gnel's death and funeral, Arshak II issued an order to mourn his nephew's death. The King, coming to the mourners, sat and began to lament the nephew he himself had ordered killed; meanwhile, Parandzem mourned Gnel so intensely that she tore her clothes, screamed, and wept.

Now that Tirit had succeeded in getting rid of his cousin, he could not restrain his passion for Parandzem. Tirit sent Parandzem a letter through his messenger։

Do not grieve so much; I am a better husband than he was. I loved you, and that is why I delivered him to death—so that I might marry you.

The woman raised a cry of indignation:

Listen, everyone: death befell my husband because of me; someone coveted me and betrayed my husband to death.

Parandzem tore her hair, shrieked loudly, and wept.

== Death ==
From this point, the sources diverge regarding the fate of Tirit.

=== Movses Khorenatsi ===
Movses Khorenatsi notes that Vardan and Tirit were sent to Gnel to ascertain why he was residing in Ayrarat, in the domains received from his grandfather Tigranes VI. According to custom, only the King himself and one of his sons designated as his successor were to reside in Ayrarat, while the others were to live in Hashteank, Aliovit, and Arberani, receiving income and maintenance from the royal treasury. The envoys ordered him to leave the region and return to the noble princes, otherwise he would be executed.

Gnel obeyed the royal command and relocated to Aliovit and Arberani, which were located in Vaspurakan.

Some time later, Arshak went hunting in the Kogovit region, located beyond Mount Masis. He was accompanied by Tirit and Vardan. Khorenatsi notes that along the way, Tirit and Vardan decided to turn Arshak against Gnel, claiming that Gnel had recently killed far more beasts on his mountain, called Shahapivan, which he had inherited from his maternal grandfather, Gnel Gnuni.

Arshak sent Gnel the following message:

Arshak, King of Greater Armenia, to Gnel, his son, (wishes) joy. Look out for places in the Tsalkats mountains with sparse shrubbery and waters, teeming with beasts, and prepare so that upon our arrival, a truly royal hunt awaits us.

The deception of Tirit and Vardan ultimately led to Gnel's death in a staged accident. Vardan, who carried out the murder, agreed to the plan not out of loyalty to the King, but due to his friendship with Tirit.

When peace was established between Shapur II and the northern peoples and he received a respite from wars, he expressed the anger he had accumulated toward Arshak for paying tribute to the Roman Emperor rather than to him for many years. Therefore, Arshak dispatched Tirit and Vardan to him with rich gifts to sue for reconciliation. However, Shapur, seeking revenge for previous battles, personally set out for war against the Greeks and on this occasion asked the Armenian King Arshak to join him with all the Armenian forces. But Arshak, unwilling to go in person, sent only a small detachment under various pretexts.

Angered by Tirit, as he believed all this had occurred at his instigation dictated by hatred for the Greeks, Arshak stripped him of his honors. The royal armor-bearer Vasak further fueled his dissatisfaction, envying his brother Vardan over a certain concubine. Therefore, the King began to reproach and berate them with caustic words. Tirit and Vardan, unable to endure such humiliation, defected to Shapur. Completely infuriated by this, Arshak ordered the same Vasak to pursue them with a large detachment and kill them wherever they were overtaken. Vasak did not delay in executing the order, despite Vardan being his brother.

Movses Khorenatsi concludes his account by asserting that Tirit's death was a consequence of the curse that Catholicos Nerses the Great had placed upon him for his involvement in the death of the innocent Gnel.

=== Faustus of Byzantium ===
When Arshak II heard Parandzem's cries, he began to understand Tirit's conspiracy and the senselessness of Gnel's death. Arshak II was shocked by what had happened and regretted Gnel's murder. For some time, he took no action against Tirit. Tirit sent a representative to the King:

Be so kind, O King, and permit me to take Gnel's wife, Parandzem, as my own wife.

Upon hearing these words, Arshak II said:

Now I know for certain that all I heard is true. Death befell Gnel because of his wife.

And the King decided to execute Tirit for Gnel's death. Learning of this, Tirit fled in fear by night. The King was informed of his flight. Arshak then ordered a detachment of azats to pursue Tirit and kill him wherever he was caught. They overtook him in the district of Baseаn, in a forest, and killed him there. After this, Arshak married the wife of the slain Gnel—Parandzem․

=== Summary ===
Despite the similarities, there are differences in the accounts of the two historians. It is most likely that the curse of Catholicos Nerses was included in Faustus's work later, as according to Khorenatsi, Nerses, upon learning of Gnel's death, cursed Arshak and the perpetrator of the murder and observed mourning for many days.

Despite Faustus's report, according to Khorenatsi, Tirit was not killed immediately after Gnel. According to Khorenatsi, Arshak was in no hurry to sentence Tirit to death, and even after Shapur II expressed his dissatisfaction to Arshak for paying tribute to the Emperor for so many years, he sent Tirit and Vardan Mamikonian to the Persian King with a request for peace and royal gifts. Shapur, intending to march against the Romans, asked Arshak to participate in the campaign with the Armenian army, but the latter sent only a small detachment. Arshak, incensed at Tirit for the unsuccessful outcome of the negotiations, stripped him of his honors. However, realizing it was impossible to execute the legitimate heir to the throne based on such accusations, the King limited himself to reproaching Tirit and Vardan Mamikonian. The latter, unable to endure such dishonor and fearing the King's further actions, attempted to find support from Shapur II. However, according to Movses Khorenatsi, by the King's order, Sparapet Vasak, who envied his brother over a concubine, pursued and killed him.

A comparative analysis of the accounts of Faustus and Khorenatsi leads to the conclusion that Tirit was killed later. Arshak, concerned about the issue of succession and regarding Tirit—believing he was attempting to enter into some agreements with the Persians—accused him and Vardan of failing the mission. Eventually, having also found him guilty in the murder of Gnel, Tirit was executed.

== Assessment ==
Richard G. Hovannisian, setting aside the lyrical description by Faustus of Byzantium, suggested that the execution of Gnel, and later Tirit, was driven by Arshak's fears that they might incite a rebellion to seize the throne.

Nina Garsoïan, in turn, proposed that Tirit's words about Gnel reflect the perception of Gnel and Tirit's presence at Arshak's court, given that they were princes of the main dynastic line and could claim the throne with the support of the nobility. V. S. Nalbandyan suggested that Gnel and Tirit were, respectively, the leaders of the pro-Roman and pro-Persian factions, which in the 4th century, seeking to establish dominance in the Armenian Kingdom, divided the Armenian nobility into supporters of the Roman Empire and supporters of Sasanian Persia.

== In culture ==
In one of the versions of the opera "Arshak II" by the composer Tigran Chukhajian (libretto by Armen Gulakyan), the character Tirit is present.

== Sources ==
- Faustus of Byzantium, History of the Armenians, 5th century
- Encyclopaedia Iranica: Armenia and Iran II. The pre-Islamic period
- R.G. Hovannisian, The Armenian People From Ancient to Modern Times, Volume I: The Dynastic Periods: From Antiquity to the Fourteenth Century, Palgrave Macmillan, 2004
- V.M. Kurkjian, A History of Armenia, Indo-European Publishing, 2008
