= Arshak II (opera) =

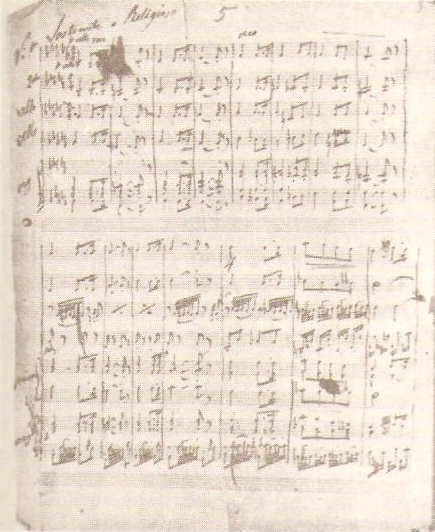
A page from the opera's score

Arshak II (Armenian: Արշակ Բ; (Note: Read Arshak Yerkrord) Italian: Arsace II) is the first Armenian classical opera, composed by Tigran Chukhajian to a libretto by Tovmas Terzian, written first in Italian and then translated into Armenian by the librettist. It was completed in 1868, and parts of it were performed in the following years. It was staged in full for the first time in 1945 at the Yerevan Opera Theater, albeit with a new libretto written by Armen Gulakian, rearrangement of parts of the score, and changes to the instrumentation; correspondingly, music historian Nikoghos Tahmizian calls this version a new edition of the opera. Both librettos are based on the historical accounts (which are mixed with epical elements) of the fourth-century Armenian king Arshak II, written by the classical Armenian historians Movses Khorenatsi and Pavstos Buzand.

Arshak II was Chukhajian's debut work and the first Armenian grand opera, which used a large performing ensemble, a symphony orchestra, a chorus, soloists and a brass band. Performers of Arshak's role include Pavel Lisitsian, Mihran Yerkat, and Tigran Levonyan. Participants in the 1945 staging, conductor Mikayel Tavrizyan, director Armen Gulakian, and Shara Talian (Arshak), received the USSR State Prize in 1946. In 1988, Tigran Levonyan directed an opera film of Arshak II, also portraying the lead role. In 2001, it was staged at the San Francisco Opera (SFO), using an Armenian translation of Terzian's Italian libretto and Chukhajian's original score, prepared by Haig Avakian and Gerald Papasian. The SFO production used light designs by Mark McCullough and was directed by Francesca Zambello. The opera was performed with Terzian's original Italian libretto for the first time at the Yerevan Opera Theater in March 2024.

== Roles ==
=== Terzian's libretto ===
Roles, voice types, premier cast
| Role | Voice type | Premiere cast, San Francisco Opera, 8 September 2001 Conductor: Loris Tjeknavorian |
|---|---|---|
| Arshak II (or Arsace), (Note: Alternative spellings of the names are given in parentheses according to Terzian's Italian libretto.) king of Armenia | baritone | Christopher Robertson |
| Nerses (or Nierses) the Great, catholicos of Armenia | bass | Tigran Martirossian |
| Olympia (or Olimpia), queen of Armenia, daughter of the Eastern Roman emperor | soprano | Hasmik Papian |
| Parandzem (or Paransema), princess, wife of Gnel | soprano | Nora Gubisch |
| Gnel (or Knel), prince | tenor | Philip Webb |
| Vaghinak (or Valinace), general of Armenia | tenor | Gordon Gietz |
| Vartan, royal bodyguard | baritone | David Okerlund |
| Polyxena (or Polisena), Olympia's handmaid | mezzo-soprano | Katia Escalera |
| King Tiran's (or Diran's) ghost | bass | John Ames |
| Priests, the people, soldiers | | |

=== Gulakian's libretto ===
Roles, voice types, premier cast
| Role | Voice type | Premiere cast, 17 November 1945 Conductor: Mikayel Tavrizyan |
|---|---|---|
| Arshak II, king of Armenia | baritone | Shara Talyan |
| Olympia, Arshak's wife | soprano | Haykanoush Danielyan |
| Parandzem, princess | mezzo-soprano | Tatevik Sazandaryan |
| Catholicos Nerses | bass | I. Grekov |
| Vasak Mamikonian, chief general of Armenia | bass | Karlos Markosyan |
| Tirit, Arshak's nephew | tenor | Avag Petrosyan |
| Spandarat Kamsarakan | bass | V. Grigoryan |
| Drastamat | tenor | G. Baghdasaryan |

== Synopsis ==
=== Terzian's libretto ===
The action takes place in the ancient Armenian capital of Armavir, in 365–367. King Arshak II has returned to his palace having defeated the Persian king Shapur II. He and his army are joyfully welcomed by the people. Among those present is the beautiful princess Parandzem, who beseeches Arshak to allow her betrothed, Gnel, to return from exile. Arshak refuses and confesses his love to Parandzem, promising her glory and the queenship and ordering her to remain in the palace. Gnel, who has secretly returned from exile, meets with his friend and relative Prince Vaghinak to conspire against Arshak.

Gnel sneaks into the palace to see Parandzem. He suspects her of infidelity at first but finds out that she went to the king to request Gnel's return. He decides to flee with Parandzem, but they are stopped by Arshak's guards, who tell them that the king has ordered Parandzem to come to him. Gnel fights to protect Parandzem but is mortally wounded.

Prince Vaghinak tells Arshak's wife, Queen Olympia, of the king's love for Parandzem and his intention to place Olympia in prison. Vaghinak and the other princes swear vengeance against Arshak. Arshak enters, and the princes attack him, but they are stopped by Olympia. The catholicos Nerses reproaches the king. Parandzem appears holding a wounded Gnel, who dies, cursing Arshak.

Sometime later at the palace, Arshak feels remorse for imprisoning Olympia. Parandzem demands that he have Olympia killed. By the isolated tower where Olympia is held prisoner, Vaghinak bids farewell to the other princes and promises to return soon with an army to overthrow Arshak. Olympia's sobs are heard from the tower.

Arshak and Parandzem meet in an abandoned graveyard. Arshak sees the ghosts of the noblemen he had killed emerge from the graves. Among them is Gnel's spirit. The ghosts threaten Arshak. The king decides to free Olympia and bring her back to the palace. He holds a feast for the occasion. As a sign of reconciliation, Parandzem offers a goblet of wine to Olympia. But the wine is poisoned. Olympia's murder prompts the princes opposed to Arshak to rise up against the king, whom they attack and kill. On his knees, Catholicos Nerses prays together with the people for peace for Armenia.

=== Gulakian's libretto ===
King Arshak II has returned to his palace having defeated the Persian king Shapur II. He and his army are joyfully welcomed by the people. Arshak is greeted by his queen, Olympia, the princess Parandzem, the clergy, and the nobility.

At the king's residence, Parandzem comes to see Arshak. She beseeches Arshak to allow her to return to Syunik, since at the palace she is constantly reminded of her late husband Gnel, who was killed on Arshak's orders. Arshak states that Gnel was punished for treason. Enchanted by Parandzem's beauty, Arshak persuades her to remain at the palace. Prince Tirit, who is in love with Parandzem, conspires against Arshak, hoping to take the throne for himself. At Tirit's instigation, the prince Spandarat tells Queen Olympia about Arshak's love for Parandzem and warns her that she may be replaced as queen and imprisoned. The distraught Olympia, who is the daughter of the Eastern Roman emperor, reminisces about her homeland. Tirit and the other conspirators await help from the Persian king Shapur and the prince Meruzhan. Shapur's messenger to the conspirators is captured by the king's men. Arshak uncovers Tirit's treason. Tirit attempts to flee, but Arshak strikes him with an arrow.

At night, at the royal mausoleum, Arshak finds out about a new conspiracy led by Spandarat. While wandering around the palace, he sees a restless and sleepless Parandzem. She has become paranoid and sees conspiracies and vengeance everywhere. She is also terrified by the fearsome King. Arshak opens a secret passage in the palace hall, through which he and Parandzem see the conspirators: the noblemen, Spandarat, and Queen Olympia. Spandarat is persuading Olympia to ask the Eastern Roman emperor to conduct a surprise attack against Arshak; only then will she be able to regain Arshak's affection. Inspired by jealousy, Olympia swears to bring about a war against Armenia. Arshak orders the arrest of the conspirators. Catholicos Nerses convinces the king to spare the noblemen and Olympia. Nerses promises to pacify the conspirators and bring tranquility to the country through the power of faith. The people joyfully receive the news of the failure of the conspiracy.

Following the catholicos's request, Arshak pardons the conspirators. The noblemen swear loyalty to the king. Spandarat plans new vengeance against Arshak. In a splendid hall of the palace, a feast is held on the occasion of Arshak and Olympia's reconciliation. The king, queen, courtiers and diplomats are present and begin to dance. Spandarat offers a goblet of wine to Olympia. The queen presents it to Arshak and asks him to drink it as a sign of reconciliation. Parandzem anxiously approaches and asks the king to allow her to drink from the goblet first. Spandarat and the noblemen become restless. Olympia, unaware that the wine is poisoned, drinks the wine first and gives the goblet to Arshak. Just as Arshak raises the cup to his mouth, Olympia rushes to him and begs him not to drink the wine, as it is poisoned. Olympia dies, and Arshak orders his men to seize Spandarat and force him to drink the poisoned wine. Parandzem becomes queen, and Arshak exposes and punishes the treason of the nobles. (Note: Both Armenian librettos (i.e., not including Terzian's Italian libretto) can be found in Asatryan 2006, pp. 146–266.)

== Recordings ==
- Aria "Arshak's Arioso" on Arias of Love & Sorrow, Gevorg Hakobyan (baritone), Kaunas Symphony Orchestra, John Fisher, Constantine Orbelian, Delos 2023
