= Shapur II's invasion of Armenia (350) =

Shapur II's invasion of Armenia in 350 AD
- Part of the Perso-Roman wars of 337–361
- Armenia's regions in the 150s.
Date	c. 350 AD
Location	Kingdom of Armenia
Result	Roman-Armenian victory
Territorial changes	Arsacid Arshak II recognized as king of Armenia

Belligerents
Roman Empire; Arsacids of Armenia	Sasanian Empire; Sasanian Albania

Commanders and leaders
Constantius II; Antiochus II of Syunik; Arsaberus I Camsaracanus; Arshak II	Shapur II (AWOL); Barsabores (executed)

Strength
Unknown	3,000

Casualties and losses
Unknown	Entire army annihilated

The Sasanian invasion of Armenia in 350 AD was led by Sasanian Shahanshah Shapur II (r. 309–379) against the joint Roman-Armenian army commanded by Emperor Constantius II (r. 337–361). It ended in a decisive victory for the allies, with Shapur barely escaping from his camp in Satala after a pitched battle. He lost much spoil in the sacking of his camp, and the victors forced him to recognize the succession in the Kingdom of Armenia of Arshak II (r. 350–368), son of Tiran (r. 339–350), who had been blinded and taken to Ctesiphon, capital of the Sasanian Empire in Asoristan, some time earlier in the same year.

== Prelude ==
Since the death of Emperor Constantine I (r. 306–337), his immediate successors had been competing with the Sasanian Empire for control over the Kingdom of Armenia. In 338, Shapur II launched a massive invasion of the Roman East, taking control over many cities such as Amida and persecuting Armenian and Mesopotamian Christians, and massacring over 16,000 of them. In 350, following the treachery of the senekapet Antiochus II of Syunik, the Marzban of Caucasian Albania Barsabores took King Tiran (r. 339–350) to Ctesiphon, but not before burning out his eyes. The Armenian nakharars (nobles) and military officers gathered and hunted him down, but were unable to save the king, and decided to pillage and capture Sassanid territories in retaliation. Shapur II responded by leading a large expedition. The Armenians sent emissaries Arsaberus I and Antiochus II to Constantinople, the capital of the Roman Empire, and asked for help from Emperor Constantius II (r. 337–361), (Note: In the passage, Faustus of Byzantium calls the reigning shah Narseh, but by this time he was already dead and the shah was Shapur II, son of Hormizd II (r. 302–309) and grandson of Narseh. Nina Garsoïan proposes that the anachronism is a confusion of the author with Prince Narseh, son of Shapur II, who was killed in combat against the Roman Empire at the Battle of Singara in 344. Elsewhere in the same context, Faustus confuses the emperor Constantius II (r. 337–361) with the much later Valens (r. 364–378).) who agreed to help. The Roman army halted at Satala, preparing for battle.

== Invasion ==
=== Battle of Satala, 350 AD ===
Constantius personally went with Arsaberos I and Antiochus II to the Persian camp at Satala to survey the conditions of the target and the size of the invading force. Having obtained the information they required, they returned to the Roman camp and prepared to march. At dawn the next day, the combined Armeno-Roman army attacked the Persians, who were taken by surprise. The entire Persian army was massacred, and the shahanshah was forced to flee, leaving behind his treasures and wives, including his chief consort (banbišn). Constantius installed Arshak II (r. 350–368), Tiran's son, as king and appointed Antiochus and Arsaberos as overseers of the country, bestowing upon them many gifts and honours. In Persia, on the other hand, Shapur conducted a thorough investigation to discover the cause of the conflict and as soon as he learned that it was all caused by Barsabores, he ordered that his diadem and ceremonial robe be removed and tortured. Then, he ordered that his skin be torn off and stuffed with straw and hung in the public square as a spectacle of reproach.

== Sources ==
- Kurkjian, Vahan M. (2008). A History of Armenia. Indo-European Publishing. ISBN 978-1-60444-012-6.
- Faustus of Byzantium (1989). Garsoïan, Nina (ed.). The Epic Histories Attributed to Pʻawstos Buzand: (Buzandaran Patmutʻiwnkʻ). Cambridge, Massachusetts: Department of Near Eastern Languages and Civilizations, Harvard University Press. ISBN 978-0-674-25865-5.
- Moses of Chorene (1978). Thomson, Robert W. (ed.). History of the Armenians. Cambridge, Massachusetts, London: Harvard University Press. ISBN 978-0-674-39571-8.
