= Samuel (novel) =

1886 Armenian historical novel by Raffi

- Cover of the 2010 French edition
- Author: Raffi
- Translator: James H. Tashjian; James G. Mandalian
- Language: Armenian
- Genre: Historical novel
- Publication date: Serialized 1886–87; separate edition 1888
- Publication place: Russian Empire
- Media type: Print
- Pages: 749 (1888 edition)
- Original text: Samuel at Armenian Wikisource

Samuel (Armenian: Սամվել, romanized: Samvel, pre-reform orthography: Սամուէլ) is an 1886 Armenian-language historical novel by the novelist Raffi. Considered by some critics his most successful work, the plot centers on the killing of the fourth-century prince Vahan Mamikonian and his wife by their son Samuel. It was first published in parts in the Tiflis newspaper Ardzagank’ in 1886–87 and released as a separate edition in 1888.

== Background ==
Raffi wrote Samuel as a response to the closing of Armenian schools in the Russian Empire in 1885. He saw this move as an attack against the Armenian language and therefore "an attack on the very essence of the Armenian ethos and the sole bond of unity for a nation in dispersion." Raffi drew parallels between the current situation and the invasion of Armenia by Sasanian Iran in the fourth century, depicting an attempt to destroy Armenian culture and language by a foreign invader. He based his story on the historical figure of Samuel Mamikonian, who is mentioned in a few brief lines in the old Armenian histories of Faustus of Byzantium and Movses Khorenatsi. Samuel killed his father, Vahan Mamikonian, and his mother for apostasy. In order to depict fourth-century Armenia, Raffi relied on Armenian sources, his imagination, and his impressions from his travels to remote parts of Armenia, where, he supposed, less change would have occurred over the centuries.

== Plot ==
The story takes place during the war between Armenia and Persia in the second half of the fourth century. At the fortress of Voghakan in Taron, two messengers arrive, one for Samuel Mamikonian, and the other for his mother Tachatuhi. Samuel learns that the Armenian king Arshak has been imprisoned in Persia and his uncle Vasak executed, and that his father Vahan Mamikonian and his maternal uncle Meruzhan Artsruni have renounced Christianity and been promised the positions of sparapet (chief general) and king of Armenia, respectively, by the Persian king Shapur II. Samuel is deeply disturbed by this news, while his mother is pleased. Samuel reveals the news to his cousin Mushegh, and they swear to protect Armenia from the Persians and take revenge for Samuel's father's betrayal. They realize that the plan of the Persian king is to destroy the Armenian kingdom, language and religion with the help of Vahan Mamikonian and Meruzhan Artsruni. Samuel is warned by the Persian princess Vormizdukht, his father's second wife, that the Persian army including his father will approach Armenia through Rshtunik, where Samuel's beloved Ashkhen is located. Samuel sets out for Rshtunik. (Note: At this point, Raffi includes three non-fiction chapters on the geography, politics and history of Armenia in this period before resuming the narrative.)

Samuel wishes to warn Garegin, the ruler of Rshtunik and Ashkhen's father, about the approach of the Persian army, but he arrives to find his fortress destroyed and Ashkhen's mother Hamazaspuhi taken prisoner. Samuel and Ashkhen find each other, and Ashkhen encourages him to go fight for his homeland rather than stay with her. Meanwhile, Garegin's troops attack the city of Van, where Hamazaspuhi is being held prisoner. Vahan Mamikonian, who is Hamazaspuhi's uncle, orders her execution after she refuses to accept Zoroastrianism. The Rshtuni troops take Van while Vahan and Meruzhan flee, and Samuel enters the city to see Hamazaspuhi's naked body hung from a tower.

Meruzhan goes to Hadamakert, the Artsruni capital. However, he is refused entry by his mother, who refuses to renounce Christianity and persuades Meruzhan's wife to join her. Meruzhan leaves shaken, and it is revealed that his motivation for his betrayal is his love for the sister of the Persian king. The Persian army arrives in Armenia, destroying cities and committing atrocities. They are attacked and defeated by Mushegh Mamikonian's forces. Mushegh returns the Persian king's harem, but he takes the king's sister Vormizdukht prisoner and sends her to the fortress of Artagers, where the Armenian queen Parandzem has taken refuge. Mushegh is sent by Parandzem to Byzantium to bring back the heir to the throne, Pap. Meruzhan arrives and besieges Artagers for months, while most of the defenders die from plague. Meruzhan takes the fortress and Parandzem is sent as a captive to Persia. However, Meruzhan is rejected by Vormizdukht.

Samuel, who had fallen ill since the events at Van, recovers and goes to meet his father and uncle. Vahan joyfully receives his son but is warned in a letter from Tachatuhi that Samuel is not to be completely trusted. While at the Persian camp, Samuel witnesses the burning of the Church's texts and sees some Armenian prisoners massacred and others deported to Persia. The Persian camp goes hunting by the River Araxes, and Samuel and his father are eventually left alone on an island in the river. Vahan explains his plans for his son, but Samuel finally reveals his opposition to his father, telling him that his actions will lead to the destruction of the Armenian nation. After an argument, the two renounce each other, and Samuel kills his father with a blow to the heart. Samuel then signals for his troops to attack the Persian army. Meruzhan is wounded in the leg but manages to flee.

An army of Armenian mountaineers led by Meruzhan's mother arrives and surrounds the Persian army. After a final attempt at negotiations is rebuffed by Meruzhan, a battle ensues in which Samuel and his companions take part. Meruzhan leads his forces despite being weakened from his wound. The Armenians emerge victorious, and Samuel spares a half-dead Meruzhan after the battle. After autumn and winter have passed, Samuel returns to Voghakan to find his mother celebrating the Persian new year. He tells her to put out the fire in the fire temple she has constructed over the destroyed Mamikonian church. When she refuses, Samuel kills her with his sword.

== Publication history ==
Samuel was first serialized in the Tiflis newspaper Ardzagank’ in 1886–87 and released as a separate edition in 1888. (Note: Incorrectly listed as 1886 on the title page.) The work was translated into English by James H. Tashjian and James G. Mandalian and published in parts in The Armenian Review in 1948–1951. The novel has also been translated into French, Russian, Bulgarian, Estonian, Ukrainian, Latvian, and Romanian.

== Reception ==
Coming near the end of the author's life and career, Samuel has been called Raffi's most successful and his most mature work. One biographer writes that, as a historical novel, it is the masterpiece of Raffi's work and of classic Armenian literature in general. It was well received upon publication. While the novel was still being serialized in Ardzagank’, Raffi received many letters with positive responses and requests to see the novel published as a separate edition. The poet Raphael Patkanian praised the work for its "wonderful, rich, simple and beautiful Modern Armenian [ashkharhabar]." The enthusiastic reception to the work encouraged Raffi to begin work on another historical novel on the struggle between Christianity and paganism in Armenia, which, however, his death in 1888 prevented him from completing.

Some critics have criticized the characterization of the novel's protagonist, Samuel. Avetis Aharonian writes that the greatest flaw in the work is Raffi's inability to fully develop Samuel's inner conflict over the act of patricide. However, he still sees value in Raffi's approach to the character's psychology. Hacikyan et al. opine that Samuel "has a substantial and distinct personality, particularly with regard to his ideological hesitations about his father's execution, which he hardly questions." Some critics have suggested that Samuel seems to be motivated more by a desire to restore his family's honor than by his patriotism. Kevork Bardakjian writes, "There are a number of instances of anachronism and protraction in this work, but some of the lateral connections are of practical importance." In his view, Raffi's decision to remove the protagonist from the main action for a considerable part of the story leaves Samuel's character "somewhat remote," but he returns at the novel's conclusion as a "heroic, if tragic, patriot." He particularly praises the characterization of Samuel's father Vahan Mamikonian, who is depicted as "an intelligent and determined man of strong convictions," but is less impressed by the character of the other antagonist, Meruzhan Artsruni.

== Adaptations ==
In 1888, painter Gevorg Bashinjaghian organized a theatrical presentation of Samuel "in living pictures" in Tiflis (the Russian censor forbade the performance of a full play). The production was a great success. The novel has been adapted into a play by H. Bagratuni in 1924 and by Jean-Varoujean Guréghian in 2005 (in French).
