= Parandzem =

4th-century Armenian queen

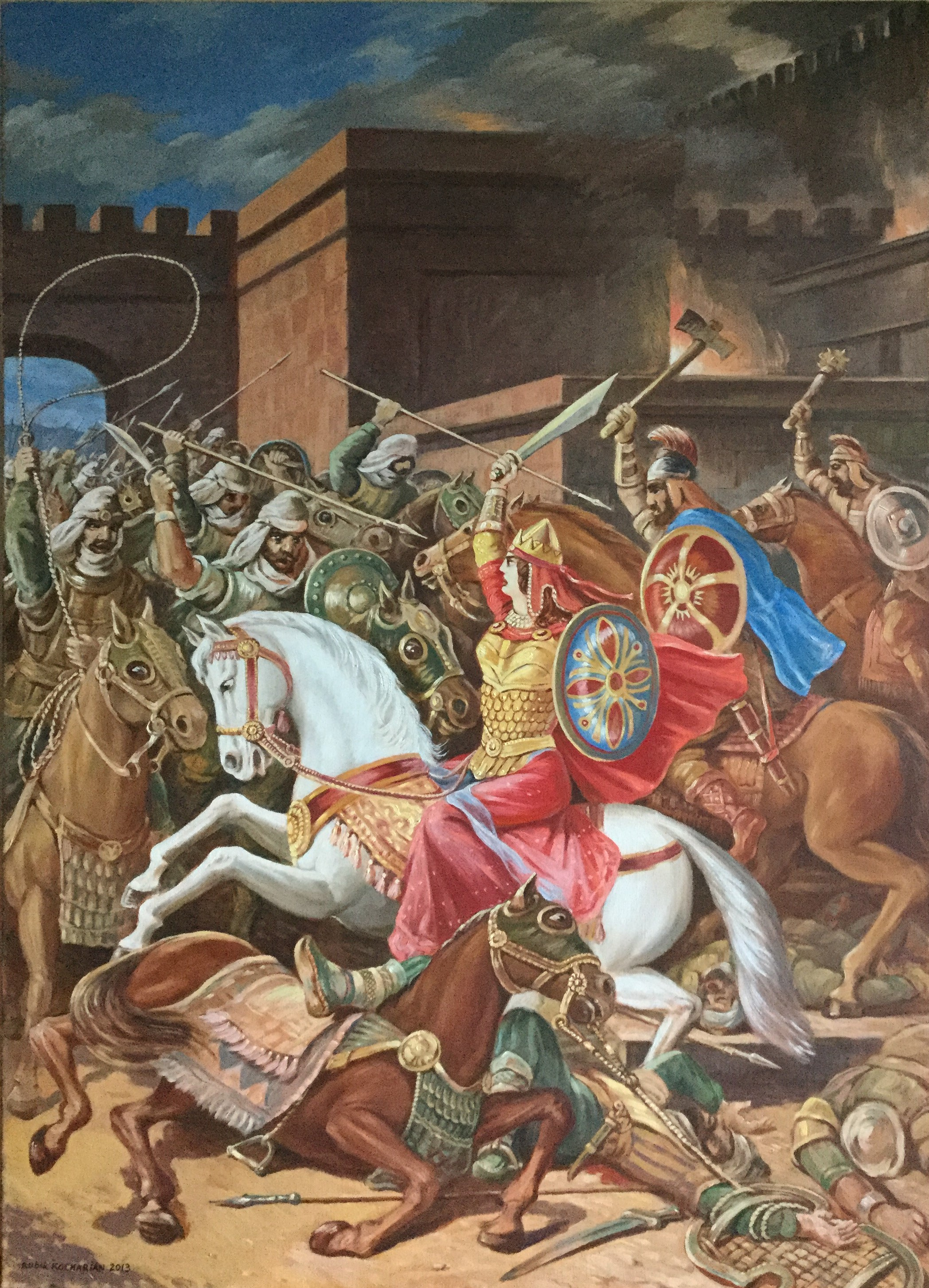
- Last Battle of Queen Pharandzem, by Rubik Kocharian, 2013

Queen consort of Armenia
- Reign: 359–369
- Died: 369/370
- Spouse: Gnel (d. 359); Arshak II
- Issue: Pap
- House: Siuni

Parandzem (Note: Also romanized as P῾aṙanjem, Paranjem, Parantzem, etc.) (Armenian: Փառանձեմ; died winter 369/70) was the consort of King Arshak II of Armenia. She was a member of the noble house of Siuni. She was regent of Armenia during the absence of her spouse and son in 368–370, and is famous for her defense of the fortress of Artogerassa against Persia. She was brutally put to death by the Persians after the fall of Artagers in the winter of 369/70. Her son Pap was soon after restored to the throne with Roman assistance.

== Name ==
The name Parandzem is ultimately of Iranian origin; it is related to the Middle Persian name Xōrānzēm.

== Background ==
Parandzem was the daughter of Andovk Siuni, nakharar (magnate) and nahapet (clan head) of the princely house of Siuni, which ruled the Armenian province of Siunik. Her mother was a princess of the Mamikonian house; Cyril Toumanoff identifies her as a daughter of Vache Mamikonian, sparapet (commander-in-chief) of Armenia in the first half of the 4th century. She had a brother, Babik, who succeeded Andovk as head of the house of Siuni. Another brother, Vaghinak, later succeeded Babik as clan head. An unnamed sister of Parandzem was the wife of Vasak Mamikonian, sparapet during the reign of Arshak II.

== Marriages ==
Parandzem was married to the Arsacid prince Gnel, a nephew of King Arshak II of Armenia. Most likely in 358, Gnel returned from being held as a hostage in the Eastern Roman court, along with another Arsacid price, Tirit. According to the story given in the 5th-century Epic Histories (Buzandaran Patmutʻiwnkʻ), which drew from epic sources and whose account was influenced by romantic oral traditions, Tirit fell in love with Parandzem, who was "greatly renowned for her beauty and her modesty". Tirit slandered Gnel to Arshak, telling the king that Gnel desired the throne and had the support of the nobility. As a result, Arshak ordered Gnel's murder. Then, discovering Tirit's actions, Arshak had him put to death as well and took Parandzem as his own wife. According to Nina Garsoïan, "The romantic tale of love and jealousy related by the Armenian sources […] has obscured the implication, found in Movsēs Xorenacʻi, that, as Aršakuni sepuhs [junior princes] entitled to wear the crown, both Gnel and Tiritʻ were possible foci of rebellion against the king." The killing of Gnel and Tirit occurred in 359. The Armenian sources also report that Parandzem murdered Arshak's other wife, the Roman noblewoman Olympias, out of jealousy. Parandzem is said to have poisoned Olympias by mixing poison into the bread of the Eucharist, which was served to Olympias by a complicit priest. However, some scholars doubt the story about Parandzem's murder of Olympias.

There is disagreement between the two main Armenian sources, the Epic Histories and the history of Movses Khorenatsi, on the order of Parandzem's marriages. Both state that Parandzem married Arshak II after Gnel's murder, but they disagree on whether she was Arshak's first or second wife. Arshak had more than one wife simultaneously despite his Christian faith and in accordance with Iranian tradition. Chronological problems are created by the fact that Parandzem's son by Arshak, Pap, is said to have been born after the murder of Gnel and the marriage of Arshak and Parandzem in 359, but other biographical details about Pap indicate that he was born much earlier than 360. (Note: Scholars have proposed various solutions to this problem. Malachia Ormanian suggested that Pap was born in 351 and was actually the son of Olympias, which is rejected by Hakob Manandian. Manandian categorically rejects Josef Markwart's suggestion that Pap was born in 360, which would have made him ten years old at the time of his coronation and fourteen at the time of his murder. Nina Garsoïan writes that only a date around 350 would make sense considering the other evidence about Pap's life.) According to Garsoïan, a possible explanation is that Arshak married Parandzem earlier and had Pap with her around 350, then passed her to Gnel in an Iranian-style temporary marriage and later took her back after Gnel's death. While Arshak was also married to Olympias, Parandzem may have occupied an inferior place among Arshak's wives, and then taken the full rank of queen of queens (tikin tiknantsʻ) after Olympias's murder, which Garsoïan places after the death of Constantius II in 361. (Note: Albert Stepanyan writes: "We do not know if this information [about Parandzem's poisoning of Olympias] is accurate. One thing is apparent – it gave Paṙandzem a chance to reshape her marriage to the king and be declared as a full-right royal consort. We can also suppose that she was 'inscribed as an Arsacid' and crowned.") Albert Stepanyan (who does not address the issue of Pap's date of birth) instead proposes that Parandzem passed to Arshak after Gnel's death since "as the head of the Arsacid clan, [Arshak] was obliged to marry the widow of his nephew, to protect his property and pass it on to a legal son." Under this type of marriage, which is called stūr ī būtak in Sasanian sources, Pap would be considered Arshak's natural son but Gnel's legal son.

== War with Shapur II and death ==
After the defeat of Roman forces by the Sasanian king Shapur II, the Roman emperor Jovian signed a peace treaty in 363 which left Armenia to face the Sasanians alone. Shapur invaded Armenia and laid waste to the country. Meanwhile, Parandzem led the defense of the royal castle of Artagers with a force of azats (members of the junior nobility). Around 367/368, Arshak II went to Persia for peace negotiations with Shapur II and was imprisoned, leaving the Armenian throne vacant. Parandzem's son Pap, the heir to the throne, was able to escape to Roman territory after a successful sortie against the besieging Sasanian forces; per the Roman historian Ammianus Marcellinus, this was organized by two Armenian defectors, Cylaces and Artabanes, who abandoned Shapur after Parandzem's appeal and returned to the Armenian side. According to the Epic Histories, Pap was in contact with his mother during the siege and encouraged her to wait for his arrival with Roman support. However, the Roman emperor Valens was only willing to send Pap back to Armenia in the summer of 369, escorted by the comes Terentius but not receiving royal honors. Pap's return apparently provoked Shapur to personally invade Armenia, causing Pap to flee the country once again. Shapur did not pursue Pap but concentrated his forces on the siege of Artagers, which ended in the winter of 369/370. The Epic Histories attributes the end of the siege to a plague that killed the defenders, while Movses Khorenatsi and Ammianus report that the garrison surrendered. Parandzem was taken prisoner and transported to Persia, where, according to the Epic Histories, she was raped to death before a crowd on Shapur's orders; Khorenatsi records that she was killed by impaling on wagon poles along with other prisoners.

== Image and legacy ==
Nina Garsoïan writes that Parandzem is given an "incoherent portrayal" in the old Armenian sources. In the Epic Histories, she is depicted in the same chapter mourning her murdered husband and then murdering Arshak's wife Olympias in a sacrilegious manner. The same source blames Parandzem for Pap's purported "demonic possession", but also "stresses her position as queen (tikin) of Armenia in both her defense of the royal fortress of Artagers and the account of her odious death in Persia". According to Garsoïan, the influence of romantic oral sources on the Epic Histories probably contributed to this inconsistency; it may also partially be the result of the queen's questionable religious orthodoxy.

Parandzem has been depicted in a number of works of modern Armenian art. She is portrayed as a "beautiful, proud, and patriotic Armenian woman" in historical novels such as Samuel by Raffi. Differing portrayals of Parandzem can be seen in the two libretti of the opera Arshak II, composed by Tigran Chukhajian. The original libretto by Tovmas Terzian depicts Parandzem's romance with Gnel but also her murder of Olympias; the Soviet-era libretto by Armen Gulakian has Parandzem help Arshak uncover a conspiracy by treasonous nobles and does not depict her as Olympias's murderer.

== Bibliography ==
- Arzumanian, Makich, ed. (1986). "Parandzem" Փառանձեմ. Haykakan sovetakan hanragitaran Հայկական սովետական հանրագիտարան (in Armenian). Yerevan: Haykakan hanragitarani glkhavor khmbagrutʻyun. p. 309.
- Garsoïan, Nina (1997). "The Aršakuni Dynasty". In Hovannisian, Richard G. (ed.). The Armenian People from Ancient to Modern Times. Vol. 1. New York: St. Martin's Press. ISBN 0-312-10169-4.
- Garsoïan, Nina G. (1989). The Epic Histories Attributed to Pʻawstos Buzand (Buzandaran Patmutʻiwnkʻ). Cambridge, Massachusetts: Harvard University Press. ISBN 0-674-25865-7.
- Garsoïan, Nina (2013). "The Problematic Marriages of the Armenian King Aršak II: An Iranian Hypothesis". Studia Iranica. 42 (1): 57–70. doi:10.2143/SI.42.1.2988862.
- Gyodakyan, Gevorg (1971). Tigran Chʻukhajyaně ev nra 'Arshak erkrord' ōperan Տիգրան Չուխաջյանը և նրա «Արշակ երկրորդ» օպերան [Tigran Chukajian and his opera "Arshak II"] (in Armenian). Yerevan: Hayastan hratarakchʻutʻyun.
- Kurkjian, Vahan M. (2008) [Originally published in 1958]. A History of Armenia. Indo-European Publishing.
- Lenski, Noel (2002). Failure of Empire: Valens and the Roman State in the Fourth Century A.D. University of California Press. ISBN 978-0-520-28389-3.
- Moses Khorenatsʻi (2006) [Originally published in 1978]. History of the Armenians. Translation and commentary by Robert W. Thomson (Revised ed.). Ann Arbor: Caravan Books. p. 108, n. 1. ISBN 978-0-88206-111-5.
- Manandian, Hakob (1957). Kʻnnakan tesutʻyun hay zhoghovrdi patmutʻyan, hator B, masn A Քննական տեսություն հայ ժողովրդի պատմության, հատոր Բ, մասն Ա [Critical theory of the history of the Armenian people, volume II, part I] (in Armenian). Yerevan: Haypethrat.
- Stepanyan, Albert A. (2021). Khorenica: Studies in Movses Khorenatsi (PDF). Yerevan: YSU Press. ISBN 978-5-8084-2514-9.
- Toumanoff, Cyrille (1976). Manuel de généalogie et de chronologie pour l'histoire de la Caucasie chrétien (Arménie - Géorgie - Albanie) (in French). Rome: Edizioni Aquila.
