= Knar =

Knar or KNAR may refer to:

- Joseph Knar (1800–1864), Austrian mathematician
- KNAR, San Angelo, Texas radio station on 89.3 See List of Air1 stations
- Knar Haykakan, a pioneering Armenian musical periodical

== See also ==
- Josh "Gnar" Brainard, member of band Slipknot
- Gnar Tapes, American independent record label
