= Haykanoush Danielyan =

Haykanoush Danielyan Հայկանուշ Դանիելյան

Background information
- Born: 15 December 1893; Tiflis, Russian Empire (present-day Tbilisi, Georgia)
- Died: 19 April 1958 (aged 64) Yerevan, Armenian SSR, Soviet Union
- Genres: Classical
- Occupations: Singer, music educator
- Instrument: Singing

Haykanoush Bagdasari Danielyan (Note: Armenian: Հայկանուշ Բաղդասարի Դանիելյան, romanized: Haykanowš Baġdasari Danielyan) (15 December 1893 – 19 April 1958) was an Armenian and Soviet opera singer (soprano) and music educator. Danielyan was the first Armenian singer who was awarded the title of People's Artist of the USSR (1939).

== Biography ==
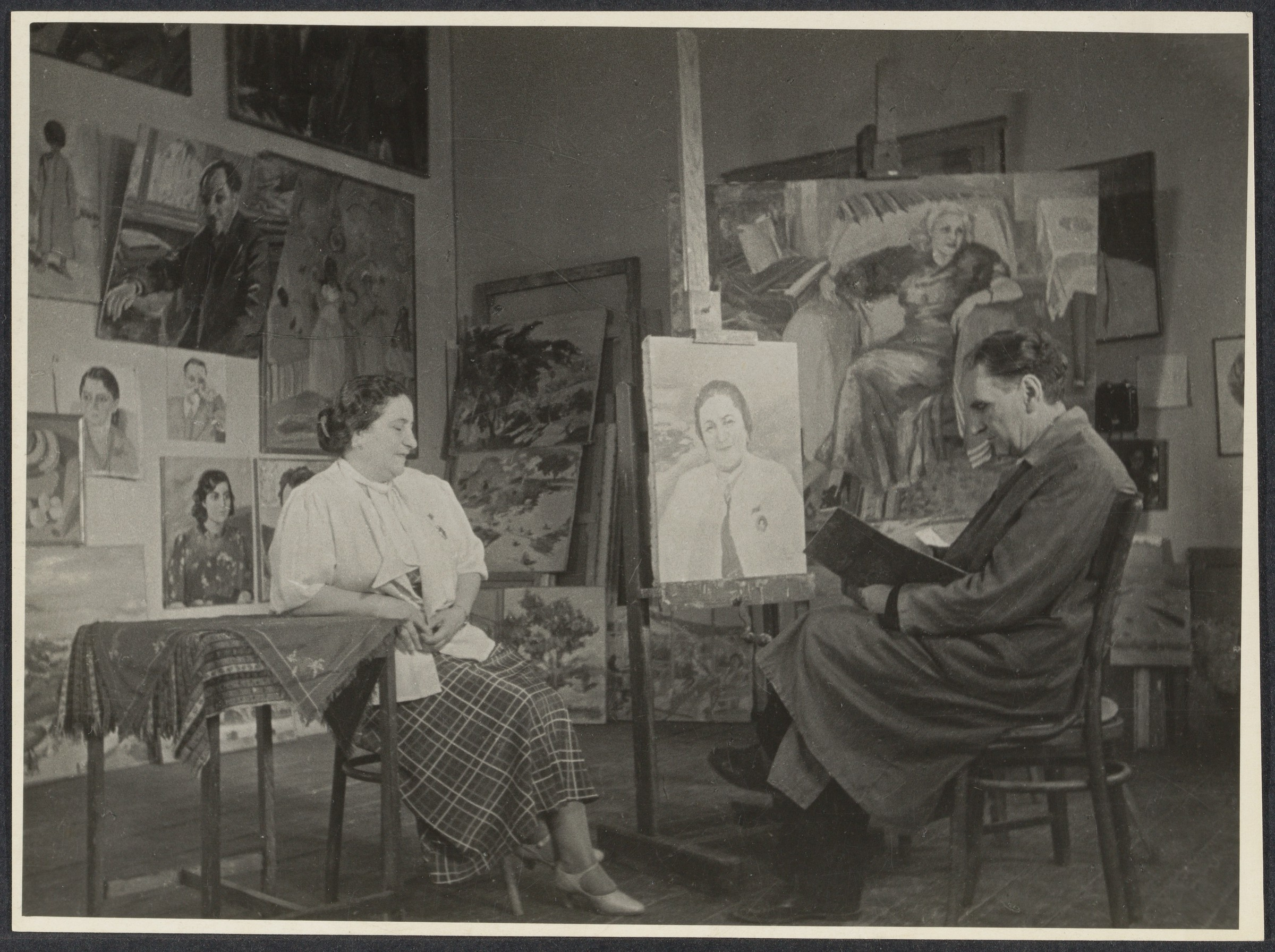
Martiros Saryan drawing Haykanoush Danielyan between 1946 and 1949

Haykanush Danielyan was born in Tiflis. In 1920 she graduated from the Petrograd Conservatory. In 1920–1932 she sang in the opera theaters of Petrograd and Tiflis. In 1924, together with the singers Levon Isetsky and Shara Talyan, she participated in the performances of Leninakan opera group and performed with concerts.

In 1941–1951 she taught at Komitas State Conservatory of Yerevan. In 1949–1952 she was the director of the Pyotr Tchaikovsky musical school. Since 1932 she had been a soloist at the Yerevan Opera and Ballet Theater. In 1941, she starred in the film Armenian Film-Concert shot at "Yerevan" TV studio.

Haykanoush Danielyan had performed songs and romances from Armenian and foreign composers: Pyotr Ilyich Tchaikovsky, Nikolai Rimsky-Korsakov, Sergei Rachmaninoff, Alexander Glazunov.

Member of the Communist Party of the Soviet Union since 1941. Member of parliament of Supreme Soviet of the Soviet Union for two convocations (1946–1950), member of parliament of the Supreme Soviet of the Armenian SSR of the first and third convocations.

She died in 1958.

== Legacy ==
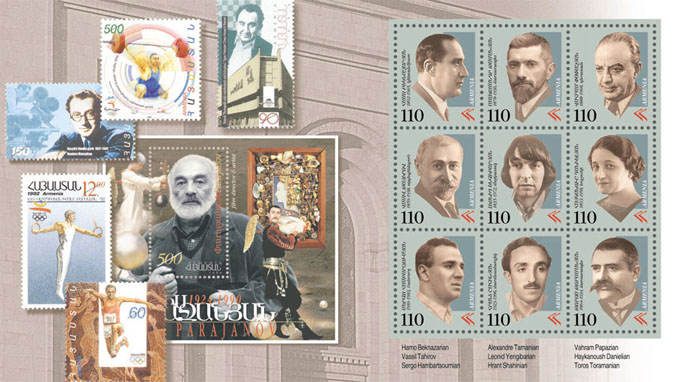
Hamo Beknazarian, Alexander Tamanian, Vahram Papazian, Vasiliy Tairov, Leonid Yengibarov, Haykanoush Danielian, Sergey Ambartsumian, Hrant Shahinyan, Toros Toramanian

- The School of Art in Yerevan's Nor-Nork administrative district is named after Haykanoush Danielyan.
- In 2000, a postage stamp of Armenia dedicated to Danielyan was issued.

== Performances ==
Author	Performance	Role
Giuseppe Verdi	Rigoletto	Gilda
Giuseppe Verdi	La traviata	Violetta
Gioachino Rossini	The Barber of Seville	Rosina
Giacomo Puccini	Madama Butterfly	Cio-Cio-san (Madama Butterfly)
Armen Tigranian	Anoush	Anoush
Mikhail Glinka	A Life for the Tsar	Antonida
Giacomo Meyerbeer	Les Huguenots	Marguerite de Valois
Tigran Chukhajian	Arshak II	Olympia

== Awards ==
- People's Artist of the USSR (1939)
- Stalin Prize (1946)
- Order of Lenin (1939)
- Order of the Red Banner of Labour (1945)
- Medal "For Valiant Labour in the Great Patriotic War 1941–1945"

== Gallery ==
Haykanoush Danielyan's house in Yerevan

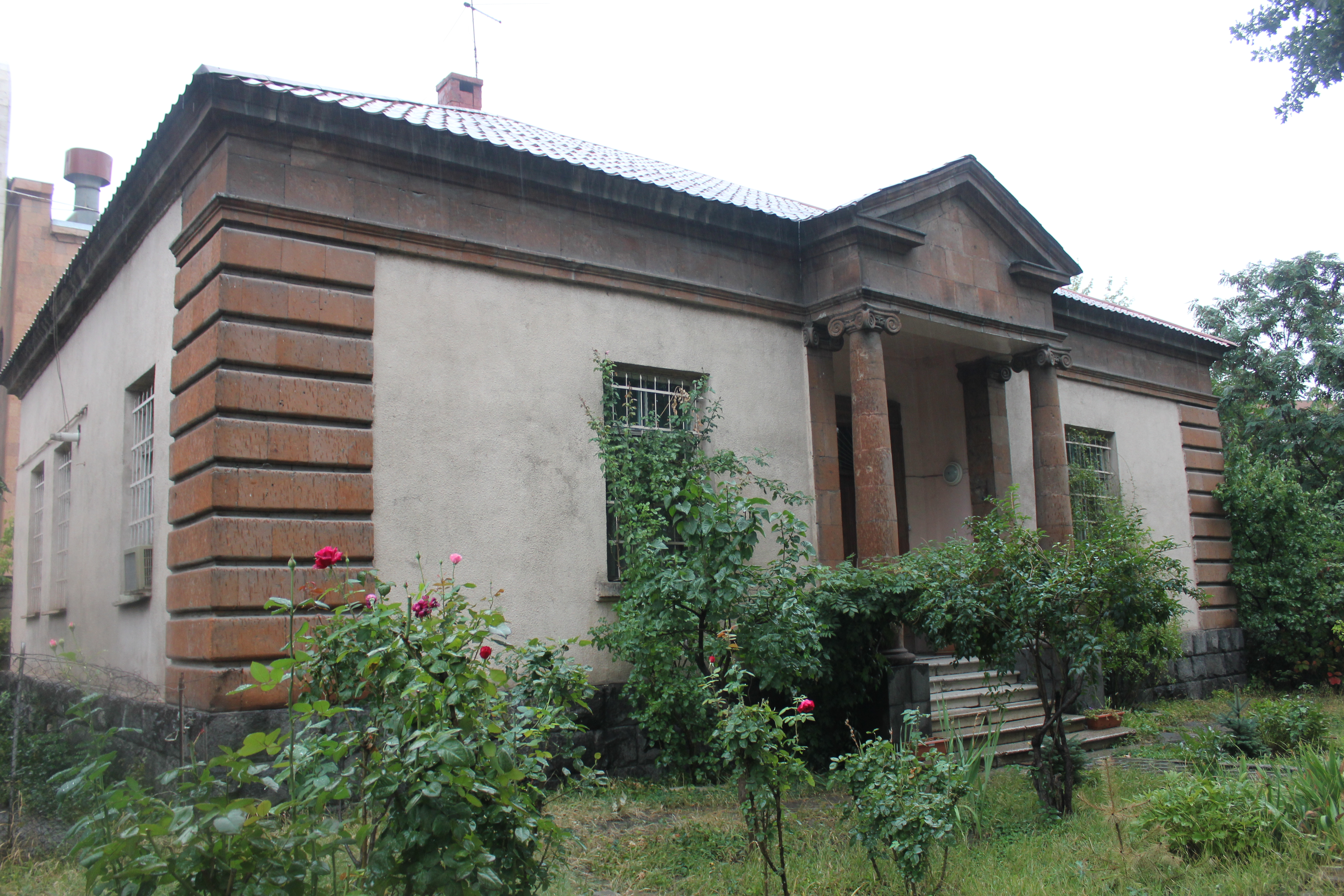

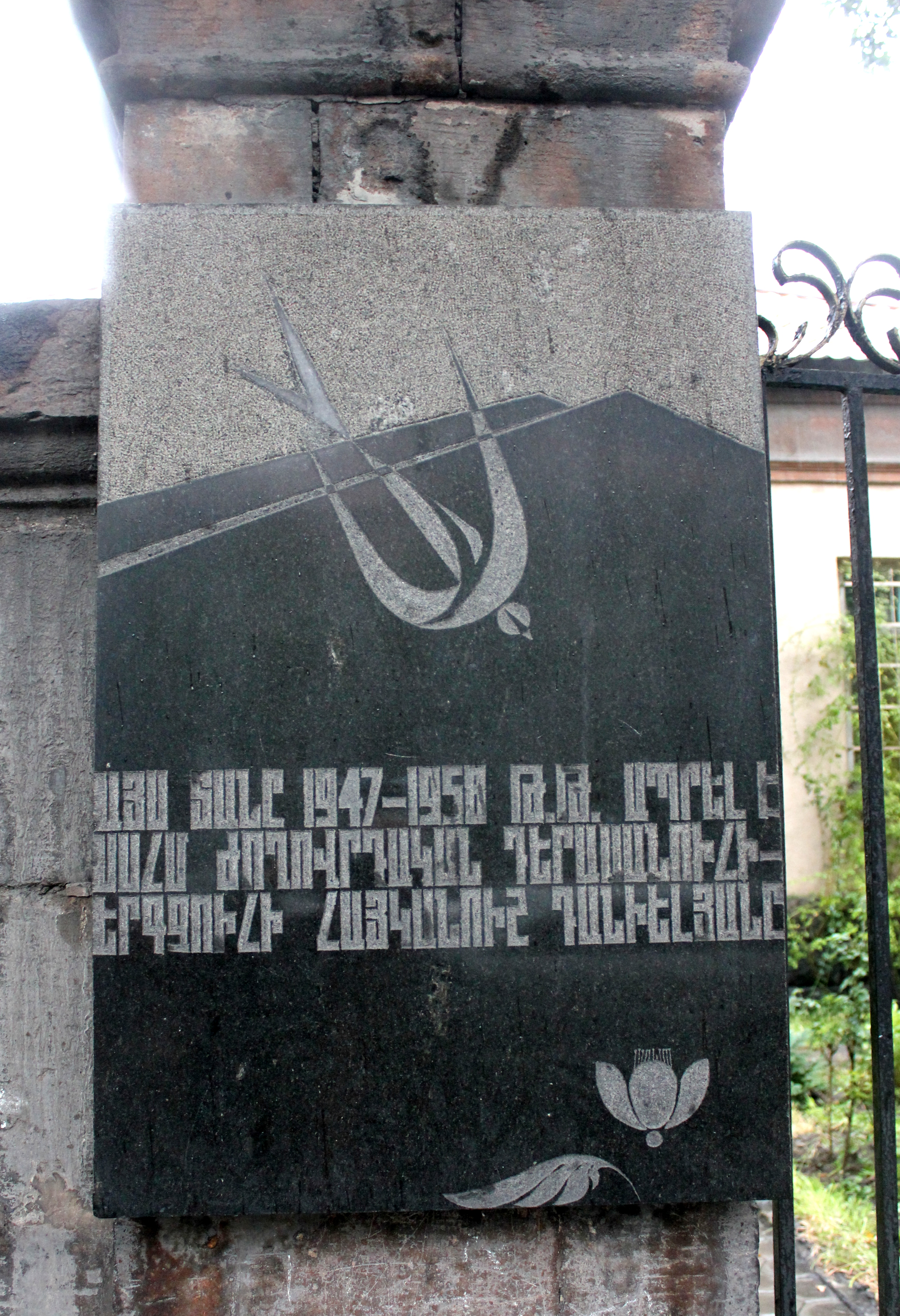

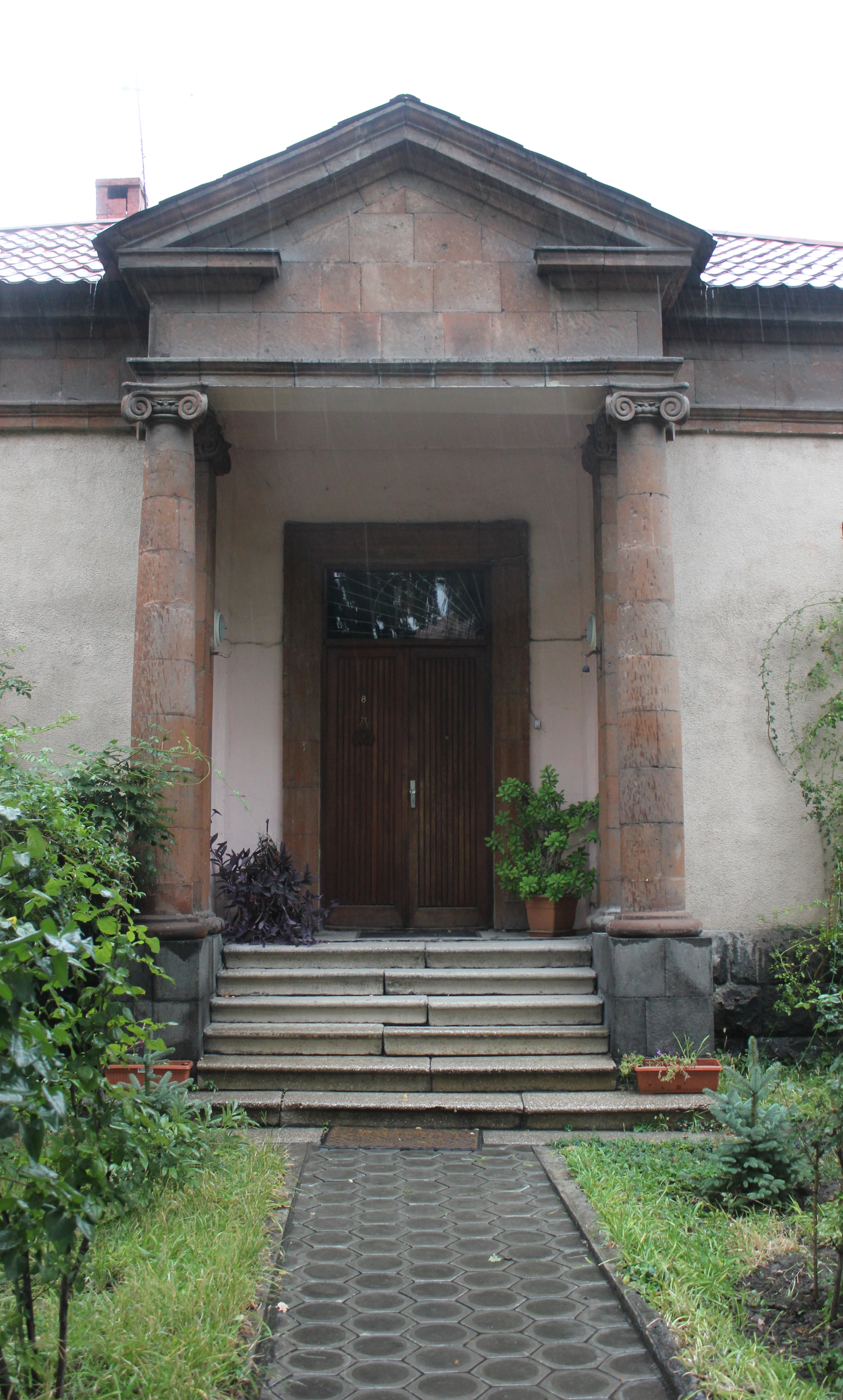
