= Battle of Ganzak (363) =

The Battle of Ganzak was a military clash between the Arsacid Kingdom and Sasanian Persia, which took place in 363. In the same year, the "Shameful Peace Treaty" was concluded between Rome and Persia, according to which Rome would not assist Greater Armenia if a war broke out between the Arsacid Kingdom and Sasanian Persia. Taking advantage of these favorable conditions, Shapur II (also known as Shapur the Great and Shapur the Long-lived) began launching campaigns toward the southern provinces of Greater Armenia, as a result of one of which the Armenian sparapet Vasak Mamikonian led the Armenian army toward Ganzak and there, engaging in battle against the Persian army, achieved victory.

== Background ==
The next Roman-Persian war, the Battle of Ctesiphon (363), ended with Rome's defeat. Emperor Julian, approaching Ctesiphon, fought a battle with the Persian king Shapur II, and was killed in the battle. The new emperor, Jovian, did not consider it necessary to continue the war and concluded a treaty with Persia. According to that treaty, the 5 southern provinces of Armenia, together with 15 fortresses and cities, were to pass under Persian control. They were also ceded Roman territories in Northern Mesopotamia, with Nisibis as the center. This policy of Rome and the concluded treaty were considered "shameful" by the 4th-century Roman historian Ammianus, who expressed his anger with the following words: "in the treaty there was also a very heavy and treacherous addition, namely, that after this agreement no assistance should be given to our constant loyal ally Arsaces against the Persians, if he should request such assistance". This treaty allowed the Persian king Shapur the Long-lived to freely implement his plans concerning Greater Armenia.

== The Battle ==
Taking advantage of the freedom granted to him by the Treaty of Nisibis, Shapur the Long-lived began concentrating his forces near the southern border of Armenia. The Armenian border guards stationed in Ganzak informed the Armenian king Arsaces II about this, who in turn ordered the sparapet Vasak Mamikonian to move toward the southern border of Armenia . The main task of the sparapet was to prevent the enemy from invading the central provinces of Armenia, for which it was necessary to block the possible routes of the Persian army. The sparapet was also in a hurry to prevent the unification of Persian detachments and the arrival of reinforcements. Before the start of the campaign, the Armenian sparapet held a military review to check the combat readiness of the army.

"The border guards of the Armenian king, who were stationed in Ganzak of Atropatene, informed King Arsaces of this in advance, even before (Shapur) reached Atropatene. As soon as the Armenian King Arsaces learned this, he ordered his sparapet Vasak to organize all his troops and go forth to confront the Persian king Shapur… Sparapet Vasak advanced, reached and clashed with the Persian king".

After a long march, the Armenian army reached Ganzak (Shahastan) and, engaging in battle with the Persian army, did not allow them to invade the country. Not all units of the Persian army had managed to concentrate in one place and take up military positions. The attack of Vasak Mamikonian caught them by surprise. Unable to withstand the assault of the Armenian army, the Persian army began to retreat. Wishing to further consolidate his victory, Vasak continued the pursuit even into Persian territories.
