= Levonyan =

Levonyan (Armenian: Լևոնյան) is an Armenian surname. Notable people with the surname include:

- Alla Levonyan (born 1975), Armenian singer
- Khoren Levonyan (born 1983), American presenter and actor
- Tigran Levonyan (1936–2004), Armenian opera singer
