= Arshakavan =

- Արշակաւան (Armenian)
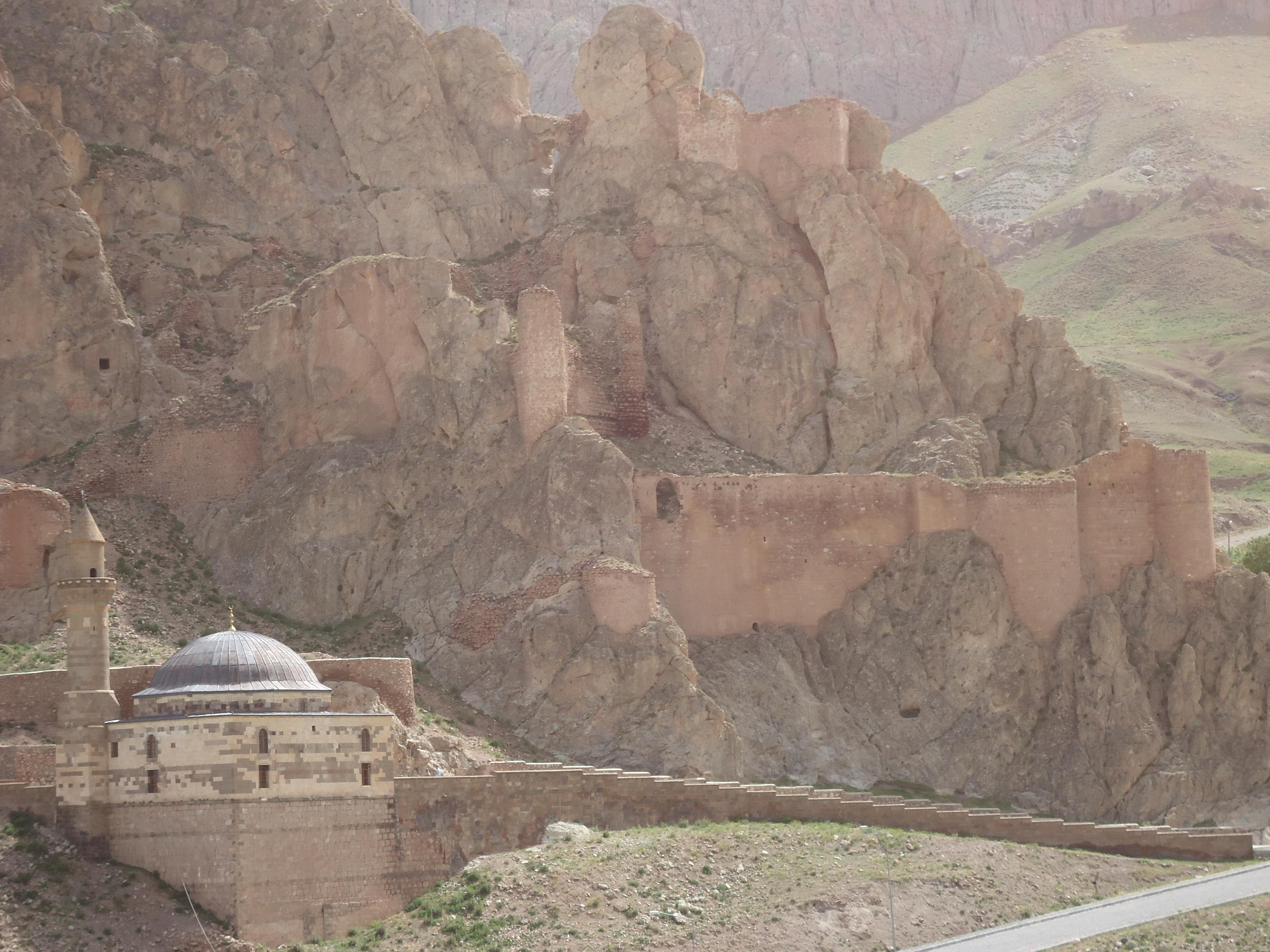
- Arshakavan Fortress near Bayazet

History
- Built: c. 350 CE
- Built by: Arshak II

Arshakavan (Արշակավան) A historical city in the Kogovit district of the Ayrarat province of Greater Armenia, located “at the foot of Mount Masis,” lay on the ancient caravan transit route Tavriz – Daroynk – Karin (Erzurum) – Trebizon (now within the territory of Turkey). It was situated on a trade route leading toward Persia. It was founded by King Arshak II at the beginning of 350s.

== Etymology ==
The name Arshakavan (Armenian: Արշակավան) is a compound of two elements: Arshak (Արշակ), the name of its founder, King Arshak II, and the suffix -avan (-ավան), a common Armenian toponymic element denoting "town" or "settlement"․This naming convention paralleled other Armenian cities such as Artashat (Artaxias’ settlement) and Vagharshapat (Vologases’ settlement), reflecting dynastic patronage. The 7th-century geographer Anania Shirakatsi recorded the city as Arshakavan in his Ashkharhatsuyts (Geography), linking it explicitly to the Arsacid lineage. Medieval chroniclers occasionally used the variant Arshakert ("built by Arshak"), though Arshakavan remained dominant in historiographical texts. The suffix -avan derives from the Old Armenian word avan (աւան), meaning "hamlet" or "dwelling," and shares linguistic roots with the Persian term ābād (آباد), used to signify cultivated or inhabited places. Alternative names for the city, such as Arshakashen (Արշակաշեն) and Arshakert (Արշակերտ), follow similar naming conventions in Armenian historiography. The suffix "-ashen" (-աշեն) means "built by," while "-kert" (-երտ) derives from the Old Iranian *kr̥ta- ("made, created"), commonly used in Armenian city names (e.g., Tigranocerta). The multiplicity of names reflects Arshak II's efforts to legitimize his rule through urban patronage, a practice common among Hellenistic and Near Eastern monarchs.

== History ==
In order to populate the city, Arshak II issued an edict according to which servants who fled from their masters,debtors, lawbreakers, and all those subject to persecution and harassment could find refuge there. According to Leo's assumption, not only individuals of bad conduct settled in the city, but also serf peasants, the so-called “shinakans”․ The inhabitants of the city were granted privileges by Arshak II, as a result of which the population rapidly increased. The settlers were mainly from the surrounding provinces. According to the exaggerated data of the Armenian historian Pavstos Buzand, the city had 20,000 households. The nakharars (nobles), having repeatedly appealed with complaints to Arshak II and receiving no response, turned to Shapur.

According to Tadeos Hakobyan, “by founding a new capital, the Armenian king sought:

- by granting certain privileges to its population, to make the population his support in the struggle against the nakharars;
- to increase the number of state taxpayers at the expense of peasants subordinate to the nakharars;
- to use the privileges granted to peasants and ‘servants’ to temporarily ease the sharply intensified class conflicts".

The method of populating Arshakavan could not please the Armenian nakharars, especially those whose domains directly bordered the city. The clergy were also dissatisfied with the founding of Arshakavan, led by Catholicos Nerses I the Great, who was particularly concerned about the free morals prevailing in the city. The Armenian historians Pavstos Buzand and Movses Khorenatsi, who wrote about Arshakavan, provide contradictory information of destructionof Arshakavan. According to Buzand, Arshakavan was depopulated as a result of a plague sent by God as punishment. According to the testimony of the “Father of History” (Khorenatsi), however, the city was destroyed by the united forces of the rebellious nakharars. Khorenatsi reports that the nakharars, joining with Nerses Kamsarakan, besieged the city. During the siege, a plague broke out, and the nakharars succeeded in capturing it. After being taken, Arshakavan was completely demolished by the nakharars. The population was largely killed; only the children were spared. Some authors date the destruction of Arshakavan either to the year 355 or to an earthquake that occurred in 358.
