= Gnel of Armenia =

Armenian prince

Gnel (Old Armenian: Գնէլ; died August 359) was an Armenian prince of the Arsacid dynasty. He was a nephew of King Arshak II (r. 350 – c. 367) of Armenia in the male line and a grandson of Arshak's predecessor, Tiran (r. 338/39–350). According to the old Armenian histories, he was murdered on the order of King Arshak as a result of the intriguing of another Arsacid prince, Tirit. Arshak then had Tirit put to death and took Gnel's widow Parandzem as his own wife.

Gnel's murder may have been the subject of Armenian minstrel traditions, which are reflected the 5th-century Armenian history Buzandaran Patmutʻiwnkʻ (Epic Histories). As Arsacid princes Gnel and Tirit were both potential pretenders to the Armenian throne and possible rallying points for rebellion against Arshak II.

== Biography ==
According to the 5th-century Armenian history Buzandaran Patmutʻiwnkʻ (Epic Histories) and the Armenian history of Movses Khorenatsi, Gnel was the nephew in the male line of King Arshak II of Armenia (r. 350 – c. 367). Khorenatsi gives the name of Gnel's father (Arshak's brother) as Trdat, who was killed while a hostage at the Eastern Roman court. Khorenatsi also states that Gnel's mother was a member of the Gnuni noble family. Gnel and his cousin Tirit were hostages in the Roman Empire; (Note: Khorenatsi records that the Armenian king Tiran (r. 338/39–350), father of Arshak II, gave his younger sons and grandsons as hostages to the Roman emperor, who is anachronistically identified as Julian (r. 361–363).) their return to Armenia is associated with the mission of the Armenian primate Nerses I to Constantinople, which according to historian Nina Garsoïan must have occurred in 358. According to Khorenatsi, the Roman emperor honored Gnel with the title of consul, but this is not recorded in any classical source or the Roman fasti.

Gnel married Parandzem, the daughter of Andovk, the powerful head of the Siuni noble house. The Buzandaran Patmutʻiwnkʻ presents a "romantic tale of love and jealousy", possibly deriving from Armenian minstrel traditions, in which Gnel's cousin Tirit, desiring Parandzem for himself, slanders Gnel to King Arshak, claiming that Gnel wants to kill Arshak and replace him as king and that many of the Armenian magnates want to place him on the royal throne. Arshak then has Gnel assassinated, despite Nerses's exhortations, during the festival of Saint John the Baptist, around the time of Navasard (the Armenian New Year). When he realizes that Tirit accused Gnel because of his desire for Parandzem, Arshak has Tirit put to death and takes Parandzem as his own wife. Gnel's death is dated to 29 August 359 by Josef Markwart.

As Garsoïan writes, the story preserved in Buzandaran Patmutʻiwnkʻ is "probably unhistorical" and "has obscured the implication, found in [Movses Khorenatsi], that, as Aršakuni sepuhs [princes] entitled to wear the crown, both Gnel and Tiritʻ were possible foci of rebellion against the king." (Note: The implication is also present in Buzandaran Patmutʻiwnkʻ, where Gnel is called the mets sepuh 'great prince'.) Khorenatsi's history seems to have drawn from a different source and relates only that Tirit slandered Gnel because he was jealous of the honors the latter had received, saying nothing about his desire for Parandzem. According to Khorenatsi, Gnel enjoyed the favor of the former king Tiran (who was blinded but still living), inviting him to live with him in the royal province of Ayrarat, a privilege normally only afforded the crown prince. Arshak ordered Gnel to leave Ayrarat and, per Khorenatsi, secretly had his own father murdered. Historian Babken Harutyunyan writes that the Roman emperor deliberately released Gnel and Tirit (who was the legal heir to the throne while Arshak was still childless) in order to create alternatives to Arshak II's rule, in case Arshak would prove impossible to bend to the Emperor's will. Vache Nalbandyan suggests that Gnel and Tirit were leaders of the pro-Roman and pro-Persian factions, respectively, of the Armenian nobility opposed to the rule of Arshak II. Gnel's murder damaged the King's relationship with the Armenian church, and the primate Nerses never again came to Arshak's court.

== Relationship to King Pap ==
Because of the confused chronology of Arshak's marriages to Parandzem and his first wife Olympias and the birth of his son and heir Pap, scholars have proposed different hypotheses regarding Pap's parentage. Historian Hakob Manandian considers it possible that Pap was actually the son of Gnel and Parandzem. Historian Albert Stepanyan argues that Pap was in fact Arshak's son, but that he was initially legally regarded as Gnel's son, as Arshak had married Paradzem in an Iranian-style levirate marriage called stūr ī būtak or čakarīh, whereby a childless widow would marry one of her late husband's agnatic relatives to provide her deceased husband with an heir. Additionally, Arshak had apparently married Parandzem while still married Olympias, despite the recent banning of polygamy at the church council of Ashtishat. For these reasons, Arshak faced serious obstacles in legitimizing Pap as his legal son and heir. According to Stepanyan, it was only after the death of Queen Olympias (purportedly by poisoning on Parandzem's orders) that Parandzem was made a full royal consort and her son Pap was recognized as crown prince of Armenia. Nina Garsoïan, on the other hand, contends that Pap must have been Arshak's legitimate son and heir, as even the sources extremely hostile to him never question his legitimacy. She proposes another hypothesis according to which Pap was born to Parandzem by Arshak around 350, after which Parandzem was passed to Gnel in a temporary marriage and later taken back by Arshak, thus explaining how Pap could have been born prior to Gnel's death in 359.
