= Tovmas Terzian =

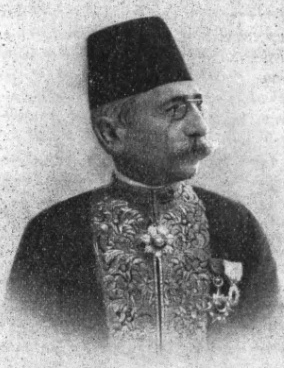
- Born: 1840; Istanbul, Ottoman Empire
- Died: 1909 (aged 68–69); Istanbul, Ottoman Empire
- Education: Moorat-Raphael College
- Occupations: Poet, playwright, and teacher

Tovmas Terzian (Armenian: Թովմաս Թէրզեան; October 21, 1840 – February 8, 1909) was an Ottoman Armenian poet, playwright, and teacher.

== Biography ==
Tovmas Terzian was born in the Pera district of Constantinople on October 21, 1840. His father, Hagop Rossi, was a Catholic Armenian tailor from Smyrna and his mother, Anna, was a Corsican citizen of France. The family mainly spoke Greek at home, as well as Italian, French and Turkish; Terzian did not learn Armenian as a child. It was frequently—and incorrectly—believed that Terzian was ethnically Greek. After attending the Sakızağacı Mekhitarist school, he attended the Moorat-Raphael College in Venice, Italy from which he graduated in 1858. Upon returning to Constantinople, he dedicated himself to teaching. He taught at the Nersesian, Nubar-Shahnazarian, and Getronagan schools. His students included famous Armenians such as Reteos Berberian, Minas Cheraz, Yeghia Demirdjibashian, Krikor Zohrab, Yerukhan, and other writers and teachers. Tovmas Terzian was fluent in English, Armenian, French, Italian, Classical Greek, Latin, Turkish, and Greek.

== Works ==
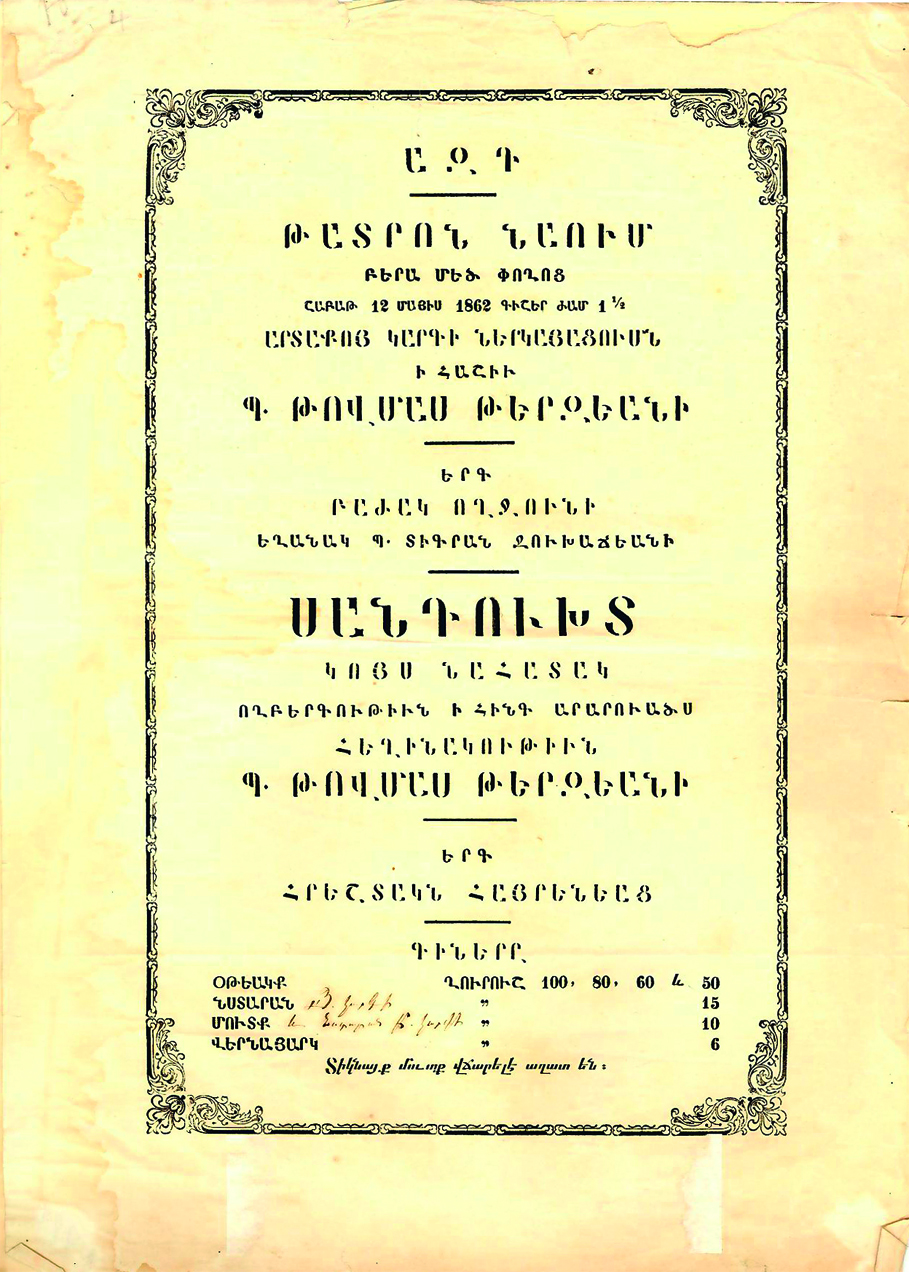
The poster of Tovmas Terzian's tragedy Sandukht

Tovmas Terzian is famed mainly for his poetry and plays. He wrote the libretto for the first Armenian opera, Arshak II, composed by Tigran Chukhajian. Terzian wrote the libretto in Italian and then translated it into Armenian. It was published as a bilingual edition in Constantinople in 1871. The libretto is based on the life of the 4th-century Armenian king Arshak II. The libretto doubles as a play, and it was performed as a play for the first time at the Italian theater of Constantinople's Naum Theatre. When the opera Arshak II was staged in full for the first time in Soviet Armenia in 1945, a different libretto, written by Armen Gulakian, was used. In 2001, Arshak II was staged at the San Francisco Opera, using an Armenian translation of Terzian's Italian libretto and Chukhajian's original score, prepared by Haig Avakian and Gerald Papasian. The opera was performed with Terzian's original Italian libretto for the first time at the Yerevan Opera Theater in March 2024.
