= Tigran Levonyan =

Tigran Levoni Levonyan (Khandikyan, Armenian: Տիգրան Լևոնյան; 1936–2004) was an Armenian operatic tenor and director, Professor of Yerevan State Conservatory. He was awarded the title People's Artist of the Armenian SSR 1984. He was the husband of Gohar Gasparyan and brother of director Armen Khandikyan.

== Biography ==
Tigran Levonyan was born in Beirut and repatriated as a child to Armenia in 1946. He graduated from Yerevan Academy of Fine Arts and Russian Academy of Theatre Arts, then gained experience at the La Scala theater.

In 1962 he became the soloist of the National Theater of Opera and Ballet of Armenia performing the roles of Saro (opera "Anush" by Tigranian), Tirith ("Arshak II" by Chuhajyan), Othello ("Othello" by Verdi), Canio (Pagliacci), Carlos (Don Carlos), Alfred (La Traviata), Shahumyan (David Bek), Manrico (Trubadur), Cavaradossi (Toska). He portrayed these characters with great talent and precision.

From 1991 to 1999 he was the artistic director of Yerevan Opera Theater. In those years, the theater staged the following operas directed by Levonyan: Verdi "Othello", Tigranyan "Anush", "David Beck", Chuhajyan "Arshak II" and "Karine". He was the first to create opera films in Armenia (Almast, Arshak II, and Palmetto).

On the occasion of 1700th anniversary of Christianity in Armenia, he staged open air performances of Anush and Palmetto at Zvartnots Cathedral.

== Filmography ==
- Karine (1968),
- Anush (1983),
- Arshak 2nd (1988, directed by Levonyan),
- Almast (1986)
