= Meruzhan Artsruni =

Armenian nakharar

Meruzhan Artsruni (Armenian: Մերուժան Արծրունի Meružan Arcruni, also spelled Merujan, Ardzruni, Artzruni, Artsrouni; died 371 or 380/1) was a 4th-century nakharar (Armenian feudal lord) from the Artsruni family.

When the Persian king Shapur II invaded Armenia in the 360s, Meruzhan, his brother-in-law Vahan Mamikonian, and several other Armenian lords renounced Christianity for Zoroastrianism and defected to Persia. Meruzhan helped Shapur's army capture Tigranocerta and raid the districts of Arzanene, Ingilene, Mzur in Upper Armenia, Sophene and Acilisene, where they captured Ani-Kamakh and desecrated the graves of the Armenian Arsacid kings. The Armenian king Arshak II fled west to Asia Minor, while sparapet (generalissimo) Vasak Mamikonian was left to defend the central province of Ayrarat alone. Arsaces and Vasak would later be captured by Shapur by deception; Vasak was put to death and Arsaces committed suicide or was executed in Anhush Berd.

Meruzhan is seen as a traitor in the classical Armenian histories. It is said that he was promised riches and governorship by Shapur and was given Shapur's sister as wife. James R. Russell believes Meruzhan to have been the dynastic ruler of Sophene who saw himself as a ruler exercising his lawful powers to counter the growth of Christianity. According to Moses of Chorene, Meruzhan was put to death by Smbat Bagratuni in Kogovit following the Battle of Bagavan in 371, where the Roman-Armenian army defeated the Persians. Faustus of Byzantium, however, reports that Meruzhan was killed several years later by Manuel Mamikonian's men after attacking Armenia with an Iranian army.
