= Olympias of Armenia =

Ancient Roman noblewoman

Olympias (Greek: Ὀλυμπιάς, flourished 4th century, died 361) also known as Olympia, sometimes known as Olympias the Elder to distinguish her from her niece of the same name, was a Christian Roman noblewoman, and a queen of Armenia by marriage to king Arsaces II (Arshak II). Through her father, Olympias was connected to the Constantinian dynasty and through marriage was related to the Arsacid dynasty of Armenia.

== Family and early life ==
Olympias' family was of Greek ancestry. Her father was Flavius Ablabius, a wealthy Cretan politically active in the Eastern and Western halves of the Roman Empire; her mother's identity is not preserved. Ablabius was one of the most important Roman Senators of Constantinople, holding the Praetorian prefecture of the East from 329 to 337/338 and a consulship in 331. Olympias had one known sibling, a brother called Seleucus. She was born and raised either in Constantinople or in Antioch, her father's base during his political career. Her date of birth is uncertain, possibly falling between the years 324 and 330, and little is known of her early life.

== Constantinian dynasty ==
Ablabius acquired great influence over the Roman emperor Constantine I, who agreed to an engagement between his son Constans and Olympias. Constantine I died shortly afterwards in May 337, and Constans inherited the throne in partnership with his brothers Constantine II and Constantius II. In 338 Ablabius was executed after falling out with Constantius II, and the marriage of Olympias and Constans never took place; the two nonetheless lived together and treated each other as a married couple. After Constans' death in 350, Olympias remained in Constantinople with his surviving relatives.

== Queen of Armenia ==
Arsaces (Arshak) II, the Roman client king of Arsacid Armenia, was greatly favored by Constantius II, who remitted all the taxes on Armenian royal lands in Anatolia. As a sign of the renewed Arian Christian political alliance between Armenia and Rome, Constantius married Olympias to Arsaces II; Athanasius of Alexandria criticized this decision in a letter addressed to the Anchorites, saying that Olympias deserved to marry a Roman emperor and not a foreign king. She was escorted to her new home by Nerses I, reigning Armenian Catholicos. The Romans commemorated the occasion with special medals bearing the portrait of Olympias, mother of Alexander the Great, with the Latin caption OLYMPIAS REGINA or of queen Olympias.

Olympias is the first known wife of Arsaces II. Although Olympias had no children with Arsaces II, they appeared to have a happy marriage, as Arsaces II loved Olympias. The Romans considered Olympias as the legitimate wife of Arsaces II as this Queen consort, maintained her influence on her husband. Arsaces II was faithful to the Roman and Christian alliance and Olympias would have become a very powerful, wealthy and influential woman in Armenian society.

== Pharantzem ==
As Constantius II died in 361, Julian the Apostate succeeded his paternal cousin as Roman emperor. On Julian's accession, Olympias’ influence on her husband made his fidelity to waver. Arsaces II later married the Armenian noblewoman Pharantzem who was the widow of Arsaces II's nephew, the Arsacid Prince Gnel. In Persian fashion Arsaces II had more than one wife. Sometime after Pharantzem's marriage to Arsaces II, she fell pregnant. In 360 Pharantzem bore Arsaces II a son, whom they named Papas (Pap). Papas was the only known child born to Pharantzem and the only known child born to Arsaces II during his Armenian Kingship.

Pharantzem had a grudge and had a great envy against Olympias, in which Arsaces II loved Olympias more than Pharantzem. Arsaces II loved Pharantzem to a degree but Pharantzem loathed Arsaces II saying, “Physically, he is hairy, and his color is dark”. After the birth of her son, Pharantzem plotted to kill Olympias through poison. Pharantzem had arranged for Olympias to be poisoned in 361 administered to her in the Holy Sacrament of communion by a priest from the royal court. Olympias was extremely careful in where she accepted matters of food and drink from as she only accepted food and drink offered to her from her maids. Olympias was poisoned through communion.

The death of Olympias, was one of the reasons that the church was totally alienated from the royal court of Arsaces II and St. Nerses I being totally outraged was not seen again in the royal court in the lifetime of Arsaces II. The actions of Pharantzem towards Olympias had placed Armenian politics unfavorable to Christian interests and she was considered an impious woman. After the death of Olympias, Pharantzem became the Armenian Queen.

== Sources ==
- Buzandaran Patmutiwnk ("Faustus of Byzantium, History of the Armenians"), 5th Century
- De Imperatoribus Romanis - An Online Encyclopedia of Roman Emperors: Constans I (337-350 A.D.)
- Martindale, John R.; Jones, A. H. M.; Morris, John, eds. (1971). The Prosopography of the Later Roman Empire: Volume I, AD 260–395. Cambridge: Cambridge University Press. ISBN 0-521-07233-6.
- F. Millar, The Roman Near East, 31 B.C.-A.D. 337, Harvard University Press, 1993
- M.R. Salzman, The Making of a Christian Aristocracy: Social and Religious Change in the Western Roman Empire, Harvard University Press, 2002
- P. Moret & B. Cabouret, Sertorius, Libanios, iconographie: a propos de Sertorius, journée d'étude, Toulouse, 7 avril 2000 [suivi de] autour de Libanios, culture et société dans l'antiquité tardive : actes de la table ronde, Avignon, 27 avril 2000, Presses Univ. du Mirail, 2003
- R.G. Hovannisian, The Armenian People From Ancient to Modern Times, Volume I: The Dynastic Periods: From Antiquity to the Fourteenth Century, Palgrave Macmillan, 2004
- I. Nordgren, The Well Spring Of The Goths: About The Gothic Peoples in The Nordic Countries And On The Continent, iUniverse, 2004
- W. Smith & H. Wace, A Dictionary of Christian Biography, Literature, Sects and Doctrines N to S Part Seven, Kessinger Publishing, 2004
- E. Gibbon & J.B. Bury, The Decline And Fall Of the Roman Empire, Volume 2, Wildside Press LLC, 2004
- V.M. Kurkjian, A History of Armenia, Indo-European Publishing, 2008
- E. Gibbon, The History of the Decline and Fall of the Roman Empire (Google eBook), MobileReference, 2009
