= Knar Haykakan =

19th-century musical periodical in Armenia

Knar Haykakan Քնար Հայկական
- Type: Bimonthly periodical
- Editor: Gabriel Yeranian (1861-1862); Tigran Tchouhadjyan (1862-1864)
- Founded: 1857
- Language: Armenian
- Ceased publication: 1858
- Relaunched: 1861; ceased again 1864
- Country: Armenia

The Armenian Lyre (Knar Haykakan) was an Armenian musical periodical first published in 1861 by Gabriel Yeranian and Nikoghayos Tashjian. However, six months later its publication was halted. In 1862 the "Armenian Lyre" music society was established in Constantinople. Its purpose was to keep the musical spirit among Armenians alive. That same year the "Armenian Lyre" periodical began publishing again, this time through the efforts of Tigran Tchouhadjyan.
