= Joseph Knar =

Austrian mathematician (1800–1864)

- Born: 1 January 1800
- Died: 1 June 1864 (aged 64)
- Education: University of Graz
- Occupation: Mathematician
- Known for: Knar's formula

Joseph Knar (January 1, 1800 – June 1, 1864) was an Austrian mathematician working at the University of Graz. He is most well known for discovering Knar's formula, an infinite product formula involving the gamma function.

== Life ==
From a poor family, Knar graduated from the University of Graz at the age of 19 after studying mathematics and law. In 1821, he became a full professor, a position which he held until his death from a stroke in 1864. He published several books including a two-volume textbook Lehrbuch der Elementarmathematik on elementary mathematics.

== Knar's formula ==
Knar's most famous mathematical contribution, Knar's formula, was his discovery of the infinite product formula:

$$\Gamma(1+x) = 2^{2x}\prod_{n=1}^{\infty}\frac{\Gamma(\frac{1}{2}+2^{-n}x)}{\sqrt{\pi}}$$

for $x > 0$.

== Publications ==
- Neues, sehr einfaches Verfahren zur Ausziehung der Wurzeln aus bestimmten Zahlen (1824)
- Lehrbuch der Elementarmathematik, 2 volumes (1828–1829)
- Theorie der harmonischen Reihen in Archiv der Mathematik und Physik (1864)
