= Castle of Oblivion =

Castle and political prison in Iran

The Castle of Oblivion (Old Armenian: բերդ Անուշ berd Anush), (Note: Alternative Armenian forms: Անյուշ Anyush, Անդմըշ Andměsh, Ընդմըշ Ěndměsh. Procopius calls it φρουρίῳ… τῆς Λήθης.) also known as the Prison of Oblivion or the Fortress of Oblivion, was a castle and political prison of the Sasanian Empire located in Khuzestan in southwestern Iran. According to the Buzandaran Patmutʻiwnkʻ and Procopius' Persian War, the name referred to the fact that it was forbidden to mention the name of the castle or its prisoners. It may be identifiable with the fortress of Agabana mentioned by Ammianus Marcellinus as the place of Arshak II's imprisonment. According to Claudia Ciancaglini and Giusto Traina, the Armenian form berd Anush is a borrowing from an unattested Middle Persian name which may be reconstructed as *anōš bard. The form Anyush is a later reinterpretation or Armenianization of the original word, identifying it with the common word anyush 'forgotten'. Ciancaglini argues that the original meaning of the name was not 'Castle of Oblivion'—a sense derived from the Armenian etymological reinterpretation—but rather 'immortal, imperishable fortress' (from Middle Persian anōš 'immortal').

== Notable prisoners of the Castle of Oblivion ==
- Arshak II, Arsacid prince, who ruled Armenia as a Roman client from 350 until 367. Captured and imprisoned during Shapur II's invasion of Armenia.
- Khosrov IV (or III), Arsacid king of Armenia who was deposed and imprisoned after 387 but was eventually released and reinstated on the throne under Yazdegerd I.
- Kavad I, Sasanian king, briefly imprisoned after being deposed by the nobility and clergy in 496.

== Sources ==
- Daryaee, Touraj (2009). "Shapur II". In Yarshater, Ehsan (ed.). Encyclopædia Iranica (Online ed.). Encyclopædia Iranica Foundation.
- Daryaee, Touraj (2014). Sasanian Persia: The Rise and Fall of an Empire. I.B.Tauris. ISBN 978-0-85771-666-8.
- Garsoïan, Nina G. (1989). The Epic Histories Attributed to Pʻawstos Buzand (Buzandaran Patmutʻiwnkʻ). Cambridge, Massachusetts: Harvard University Press. ISBN 0-674-25865-7.
- Kettenhofen, Erich (1988). "Das Staatsgefangnis der Sasaniden". Welt des Orients (in German). 19: 96–101. ISSN 0043-2547. JSTOR 25683292.
- Traina, Giusto; Ciancaglini, Claudia A. (2002). "La Forteresse de l'Oubli". Le Muséon (in French). 115 (3–4): 399–422. doi:10.2143/MUS.115.3.336.
