= Siunia dynasty =

The Siuni or Siwni dynasty (Note: Also called the Siunids, Sisakeans (Old Armenian: Սիսակեան) or the House of Siwnikʻ. The name of the province Siwnikʻ can be interpreted as the plural form of the name of the dynasty.) (Old Armenian: Սիւնի) was an ancient Armenian princely (nakharar) dynasty which ruled the province of Siwnikʻ, with which the dynasty shared its name. They were one of the most important and powerful princely houses in antique and early medieval Armenia.

The Siwnis were said to be descendants of Sisak, one of the descendants of Hayk, the legendary patriarch of the Armenians. According to Robert H. Hewsen, the Siwnis were of non-Armenian origin. They were recognized as the hereditary rulers of Siwnikʻ with the division of Greater Armenia into provinces (ashkharhs) under Artaxias I in the second century BCE, although they may have been the local ruling dynasty even before that. The Siwnis were the most powerful princely house in the Kingdom of Armenia. According to the Zōranamak, a military register which listed the military obligations of each of the great noble houses, the Siwnis were supposed to raise a cavalry force of 19,400. They were honored with numerous gifts and privileges by the Armenian kings for their services, including the privilege of occupying the first seat next to the king at the royal banquet table.

Nothing is known about the activities of the Siwnis prior to the Christianization of Armenia in the early fourth century. The Siwnis participated in the Christianization and a Siwni prince accompanied Gregory the Illuminator to Caesarea to be ordained Patriarch of Armenia. The first Siwni prince whose name we know is Vaghinak Siwni, who was appointed bdeashkh of Arzanene by King Khosrov III. Vaghinak's brother Andok or Andovk became an important military commander in the late 330s. In the mid-fourth century, King Tiran appointed Pʻisak Siwni commander of the eastern part of the Armenian troops, while Andovk was made overseer of Arzanene and the city of Tigranocerta. After Vaghinak's death, Andovk became the head of the Siwni dynasty. His influence and authority increased after King Arshak II married his daughter Parandzem. Andovk was a member of the pro-Roman faction of Armenian magnates. He commanded the defense of Tigranocerta against the invading Sasanian king Shapur II in the mid-360s. After the occupation of Armenia by Shapur, Siwnikʻ was ravaged by the Persian troops and many members of the Siwni family were hunted down and killed.

The Siwnis reestablished themselves in their traditional territory some ten years later, during the regency of Manuel Mamikonean (377–384). Andovk's son Babik became the head of the dynasty at this time. Babik married his daughter to King Arshak III, and his son Dara was appointed sparapet (general-in-chief). After the partition of Armenia in 387, Dara went with Arshak III to Roman Armenia and was killed while fighting against Khosrov IV, who ruled in the eastern part of Armenia under Sasanian suzerainty. Babik's successors Vaghinak and Vasak are said to have assisted Mesrop Mashtots in establishing schools and spreading Christianity in Siwnikʻ. After the fall of the last Arsacid king of Armenia in 428, the Siwnis played an important role in Sasanian Armenia's political life. Vasak Siwni was appointed marzban first of Iberia, then of Armenia in the 430s and 440s. It was probably during this period that the Siwnis were entrusted with defended the passes of the Caucasus Mountains against invaders from the north, further increasing their authority in the region. Vasak Siwni was branded as a traitor by Armenian historians for his role in the rebellion of 450–451 led by Vardan Mamikonean. It is said that Vasak refused to join the rebellion, and that his supporters deserted at the Battle of Avarayr, where the Armenian rebels were crushed. Vasak was removed as marzban and imprisoned in Iran after the rebellion.

Vasak's successors, Varazvaghan and Gdehon, were proponents of better relations with the Sasanian court. During Vahan Mamikonean's rebellion (481–484), Gdehon was captured and executed by the rebels. In 571, at the request of prince Vahan Siwni, Siwnikʻ was removed from Sasanian Armenia and made a part of the province of Adurbadagan.

A cadet branch of the dynasty came to rule the Kingdom of Artsakh as of the 11th century.

== See also ==
- Syunik (historical province)
- Syunik Province

== Bibliography ==
- Garsoïan, Nina (1997). "The Marzpanate (428–652)". In Hovannisian, Richard G. (ed.). The Armenian People from Ancient to Modern Times. Vol. 1. New York: St. Martin's Press. pp. 95–115. ISBN 0-312-10169-4.
- Harutʻyunyan, B. (1984). "Syuniner". Soviet Armenian Encyclopedia (in Armenian). Vol. 10. Erevan. pp. 473–475.
- Hewsen, Robert H. (1982). "Ethno-History and the Armenian Influence upon the Caucasian Albanians". In Samuelian, Thomas J. (ed.). Classical Armenian Culture: Influences and Creativity. Chico, CA: Scholars Press. pp. 27–40. ISBN 0-89130-565-3.
- Minorsky, V. (1953). "Caucasica IV". Bulletin of the School of Oriental and African Studies, University of London. 15 (3): 504–29. doi:10.1017/S0041977X00111462. JSTOR 608652. S2CID 246637768.
- Toumanoff, Cyril (1963). Studies in Christian Caucasian History. Georgetown University Press. OCLC 505712128.
