= Tiran of Armenia =

King of Armenia from 338/39 to 350

Tiran

King of Armenia
- Reign: 338/39–350
- Predecessor: Khosrov III
- Successor: Arshak II
- Died: c. 358
- Issue Detail: Artashes; Arshak II; Tiridates
- Dynasty: Arsacid
- Father: Khosrov III the Small
- Religion: Christianity (possibly Arianism)

Tiran (Note: Also Diran according to the Western Armenian pronunciation. Erroneously called Tigranes in some sources.) (died c. 358) was an Arsacid king of Armenia in the second quarter of the fourth century. The chronology of his reign is problematic, and scholars have proposed different dates for its beginning and end. According to one version, he succeeded his father Khosrov III in 338, placed on the throne by the Roman emperor Constantius II after a Persian invasion of Armenia. His reign appears to have marked the beginning of the antagonism between the Arsacid kings and the Armenian Church, possibly because of the Arsacid kings' promotion of Arianism, in following with contemporary Roman policy. Tiran ordered the assassination of the head of the Armenian Church, Catholicos Husik. He also came into conflict with the nobility because of his attempts to centralize power. During the course of the Sasanian king Shapur II's campaigns against the Roman Empire in the 340s, Tiran was reportedly betrayed by one of his vassals, captured by the Persians, and blinded. He was later allowed to return to Armenia and abdicated in favor of his son Arshak II. According to the Armenian historian Movses Khorenatsi, Tiran was later strangled on Arshak's orders.

== Name ==
The name Tiran (Armenian: Տիրան) is of Iranian origin and derives from the name of the Zoroastrian deity Tir, who shares a name with the Armenian god of scribal arts Tir. Robert H. Hewsen argues that there was no Armenian king named Tiran in the fourth century, and that tiran was actually a title of the earlier king Tiridates III. Nina Garsoïan considers this version unlikely. Tiran has incorrectly been referred to as Tigranes VII in some sources.

== Ancestry ==
Tiran was a child of King Khosrov III Kotak. According to the fifth-century Armenian history Buzandaran Patmutʻiwnkʻ (traditionally attributed to Faustus of Byzantium), Tiran had a sister named Bambishn, who married Atanagines, son of Catholicos Husik, and bore Nerses I, who later became catholicos himself. However, this poses certain chronological and genealogical difficulties, as Atanagines's father Husik is said to have married a daughter of Tiran, which would mean that Atanagines married his own great-aunt. (Note: According to Nina Garsoïan, the generational gap is likely the result of a slip of the pen, but these marriages may also reflect the continuance of Zoroastrian-style consanguineous marriages in early Christian Armenia.) Additionally, Bambishn was a title borne by royal ladies in the Sasanian period, so this is probably a title rather than her actual name.

== Reign ==
Tiran succeeded his father, King Khosrov III. The chronology of Tiran's reign is problematic. According to Nina Garsoïan, he was likely the king—not mentioned by name—returned to the Armenian throne by the Roman emperor Constantius II in 338 after a Persian invasion, as recorded in the emperor Julian's panegyric to Constantius. (Note: 338 is also the date given by Suren Yeremian for Tiran's accession.) (Note: According to the history of Movses Khorenatsi, Tiran was taken to Constantinople with Catholicos Vrtanes after the death of Khosrov III; he was made king of Armenia by Constantius and sent back to Armenia in the seventeenth year of Constantius's reign (i.e., 354).) Robert H. Hewsen argues that the beginning of the reign of Arshak II should be dated to 338 and that Tiran's reign should be eliminated altogether. M. L. Chaumont accepts the 338 dating of Arshak's accession but places Tiran's reign before that, ending in c. 334/335 or not long after that.

The antagonism between the Arsacid kings and the Armenian Church seems to have started during Tiran's reign. The Buzandaran Patmutʻiwnkʻ attributes this antagonism to Tiran's sinful behavior. According to Nina Garsoïan, it was more probably the result of the Arsacid kings' support of Arianism, in following with the policy of the Byzantine court at the time. Suren Yeremian suggests that Tiran sought to free himself from the tutelage of the clergy and adopt a more lenient attitude towards his non-Christian subjects, thus winning over the anti-Roman and anti-Church section of the nobility. According to the Buzandaran Patmutʻiwnkʻ, Tiran ordered the murder of Catholicos Husik, the head of the Armenian Church, after the catholicos denied him entry to a church in Sophene on a feast day. After this, the prominent chorbishop Daniel was also murdered on Tiran's orders, and the leadership of the Armenian church passed, for a time, from the Gregorids to the patriarchs of the line of Albianos, who were obedient to the king. The Buzandaran Patmutʻiwnkʻ also records Tiran's conflict with the Armenian nobility, incited by the eunuch official Hayr Mardpet. In particular, Tiran is said to have ordered the massacre of the Rshtuni and Artsruni houses, provoking the outrage of the Mamikonians. In Yeremian's view, Tiran, with the help of Hayr Mardpet, centralized royal authority, punished the Armenian magnates with "separatist aspirations" and seized their holdings; this turned the nobility, especially its pro-Roman wing, against him.

During Tiran's reign, the Sasanian king Shapur II launched several campaigns against Rome, during which Armenia was devastated by the Persians. Both Khorenatsi and the older Buzandaran Patmutʻiwnkʻ report that Tiran was captured and blinded by the Persians, after which he was succeeded by his son Arshak II. However, the two accounts differ on some details and are mixed with epic elements. Per the Buzandaran Patmutʻiwnkʻ, Tiran was betrayed to the Persians by his chamberlain (senekapet) Pisak Siuni. According to Yeremian, at one point Tiran attempted to appease Shapur, which angered the Romans and the pro-Roman party in Armenia; after this, the Romans executed Tiran's son Trdat, who was being held as a hostage in Constantinople (as reported by Khorenatsi). Tiran's grandsons Gnel and Tirit were also hostages in Constantinople and were under threat. At this point, writes Yeremian, Tiran changed his policy and reconciled with the pro-Roman party, provoking Shapur's wrath. During the Roman-Sasanian fighting in 344, Tiran was captured and blinded by the Persians. However, after the Battle of Singara and the death of the Persian prince Narseh, he was allowed to return to Armenia in 345 to be succeeded by his son Arshak II. (Note: Yeremian follows Nicholas Adontz in placing the beginning of Arshak II's reign in 345.) Garsoïan estimates the date of Tiran's capture and deposition as 350. (Note: This date is also given for Arshak II's accession by historians Leo, P. Asdourian, and others, whereas Hakob Manandian considered the date to be uncertain.) Hakob Manandian considers the story of Tiran's capture and blinding to be an invention of the Armenian epic tradition. According to the fourth-century Roman historian Ammianus Marcellinus, Tiran's successor Arshak II was blinded by the Persians. It is possible that Tiran and Arshak were confused in the Armenian epic tradition, from which the Buzandaran Patmutʻiwnkʻ drew heavily. Khorenatsi writes that Tiran spent the rest of his years in the village of Kuash on the slopes of Mount Aragats, until he was strangled on Arshak II's orders after he admonished his son for his treatment of Gnel, Arshak's nephew; the Buzandaran Patmutʻiwnkʻ gives no information about Tiran's death.

== Family ==
Tiran was succeeded by his son Arshak II. According to Movses Khorenatsi, Tiran's eldest son was named Artashes and predeceased him. Artashes was the father of Tirit, later killed by Arshak. Khorenatsi also names a third son of Tiran named Trdat, who was the father of Gnel (also later killed by Arshak) and was executed while a hostage in Byzantium.

== See also ==
- Saint Sarkis the Warrior, Armenian saint associated with King Tiran
