= Vahan Kurkjian =

Armenian community leader

- Born: 1863; Aleppo, Ottoman Syria
- Died: 1961 (aged 97–98); New York City, New York
- Education: Boston University
- Occupations: author, historian, teacher, and community leader
- Website: History of Armenia

Vahan M. Kurkjian (Armenian: Վահան Մ. Քիւրքճեան; 1863–1961) was an Armenian author, historian, teacher, and community leader.

In 1904, in Cairo, he published the Armenian newspaper Loussaper (The Morning Star), in the pages of which he and other intellectuals called for a national union for the Armenian people. The idea eventually materialized in the form of the Armenian General Benevolent Union. In 1907 he emigrated to the United States and studied law at Boston University. Two years later, also in Boston, he founded the first American chapter of the Armenian General Benevolent Union. From its inception he was inseparably identified with that organization, serving as its executive director until his retirement in 1939. Kurkjian was a frequent contributor of articles to Armenian newspapers, and published a number of books and pamphlets, among which the best-remembered is his History of Armenia.

== Editions ==
- A History of Armenia
  - Armenian General Benevolent Union of America, 1964
  - Indo-European Publishing, 2008, ISBN 978-1-60444-012-6
