= Arshak II =

4th-century Armenian king

Arshak

King of Armenia
- Reign: 338 or 350 – 367
- Predecessor: Tiran of Armenia
- Successor: Pap of Armenia
- Born: Unknown
- Died: 368/69
- Consort: Olympias (358–361); Parandzem
- Issue: Pap of Armenia
- House: Arsacid
- Father: Tiran of Armenia
- Religion: Christianity (possibly Arianism)

Arshak II (flourished 4th century, died 369 or 370), also written as Arsaces II, was an Arsacid prince who was King of Armenia from 350 (338/339 according to some scholars) until c. 364/367. Although Arshak's reign opened with a period of peace and stability, it was soon plagued by his conflicts with the Armenian church and nobility, as well as a series of wars between Rome and Persia, during which the Armenian king teetered between the warring sides. Arshak participated in the Roman emperor Julian's ill-fated campaign against Persia; after the consequent Perso-Roman Treaty of 363, Armenia was left to fend for itself against a renewed attack by the Persian king Shapur II. Faced with defections and rebellions among the Armenian nobility, Arshak was lured to Persia for peace negotiations with Shapur, after which he was imprisoned in the Castle of Oblivion in Khuzistan and is said to have committed suicide in captivity. Arshak's reign was followed by the conquest and devastation of Armenia by the Persians, although his son and heir Pap managed to escape and later ascended to the Armenian throne with Roman assistance.

== Name ==
Arshak (Old Armenian Արշակ, Aršak, Parthian 𐭀𐭓𐭔𐭊, Aršak) was the name of the eponymous founder of the ruling dynasty of the Parthian Empire, of which the Armenian Arsacids were a branch. The name was also used as a title by all succeeding Parthian kings. The Greek form of this name is Arsákēs, whence Latin Arsaces. These ultimately derive from a diminutive of the name Old Iranian name Aršan, meaning 'hero'. Alternatively, the name is composed of the Old Persian word arša 'bear' and a diminutive suffix. Philologist Karapet Melik-Ohanjanyan argued (but, per Nina Garsoïan, did not prove) that Arshak's real name was Khosrov, like his grandfather, based on the assumption that the names of the Arsacids alternated between generations.

== Accession ==
Arshak II was the second son of Tiran (erroneously called Tigranes VIII in some sources) by a mother whose name is unknown. His father served as the Roman client king of Arsacid Armenia from 338/339 until 350 (although some scholars place the beginning of Arshak's reign in 338/339 and Tiran's reign before that). His date of birth is unknown and nothing is known about his early life. During Tiran's reign, the Sasanian king Shapur II launched several campaigns against Rome, during which Armenia was devastated by the Persians. Both the Armenian historian Movses Khorenatsi and the older history Buzandaran Patmutʻiwnkʻ (traditionally attributed to a Faustus of Byzantium) report that Tiran was captured and blinded by the Persians, after which he was succeeded by Arshak II. According to modern historian Suren Yeremian, Tiran's capture and blinding took place during the Roman-Sasanian fighting in 344; after the Battle of Singara and the death of the Persian prince Narseh, Tiran was allowed to return to Armenia in 345 to be succeeded by Arshak II. (Note: Yeremian follows Nicholas Adontz in placing the beginning of Arshak II's reign in 345.) Garsoïan estimates the date of Tiran's capture and Arshak's accession as 350. (Note: This date is also given for Arshak II's accession by historians Leo, P. Asdourian, and others, whereas Hakob Manandian considered the date to be uncertain.) According to another view, Arshak was enthroned as early as 338/339 (possibly at the request of Constantius II) following Shapur's first failed attempt to capture Nisibis.

== Reign ==
The early years of Arshak's reign were peaceful. According to the Buzandaran Patmutʻiwnkʻ, Arshak undertook the "ordering of the realm" and brought the Armenian magnates (nakharars) under his control. At the same time, a series of reforms was initiated by Catholicos Nerses I, Arshak's cousin, who became patriarch in 353. Arshak preferred to rule from his royal encampment rather than from the capital Dvin. There are differences in the sources regarding the nature of Arshak II's foreign policy. The Roman historian Ammianus Marcellinus describes Arshak II as a "steadfast and faithful friend" to the Roman Empire. In the Buzandaran Patmutʻiwnkʻ, on the other hand, Arshak is depicted as vacillating between the Romans and Persians. Arshak seems to have attempted to balance Armenia's relations with the Roman and Sassanid empires. He may have adopted a neutral position early in his reign, followed by a possible reconciliation with Persia, and then an abrupt pivot towards Rome in 358 because of the emperor Constantius II's concessions. In 358, at Constantius II's suggestion, Arshak II married the Greek noblewoman Olympias, daughter of the late consul Ablabius. Constantius also granted Arshak exemption from taxation. Additionally, the Roman emperor allowed the return of Armenian hostages, including the king's nephews Gnel and Tirit.

According to Nina Garsoïan, Arshak II, like his father, pursued a policy strongly in favor of Arianism, which led to a falling out with Catholicos Nerses. Nerses was eventually exiled (Note: In approximately 359, per Garsoïan 1969, p. 156.) for around nine years along with other anti-Arian bishops and replaced during that time by a royal appointee called Chunak. Arshak's relations with the Armenian nobility also soured, leading him to order the assassinations of prominent nakharars, the extermination of several noble houses (such as the Kamsarakans) and the confiscation of their lands. In 359, Arshak ordered the murder of his nephews Gnel (in defiance of the intercession of Nerses) and Tirit. Although the Buzandaran Patmutʻiwnkʻ presents this as a story of romance and jealousy involving Parandzem, Gnel's wife whom Arshak later married, it is more likely that Arshak ordered the murders because his nephews, as Arsacid princes and potential pretenders, could have become rallying points for a rebellion against him. (Note: According to Faustus (Book IV, chapter 15), Tirit, who desired Gnel's wife Parandzem, slandered Gnel to Arshak, telling the king that Gnel wished to kill him and take his throne. Arshak then had Gnel killed, despite Nerses's exhortations not to do it. Arshak then realized Tirit's deed and ordered him killed as well. Arshak then took Parandzem as his own wife. According to Garsoïan, this story is "probably unhistorical." Movses Khorenatsi (Book III, chapters 21–25) records the same story with some additional details not found in Faustus, such as that Gnel's father (and Arshak's brother) was executed in Byzantium, that Arshak had his father Tiran strangled for admonishing him for his treatment of Gnel, and that Tirit was aided by a Mamikonian prince.) He attempted to shore up his rule by founding the city of Arshakavan in Kogovit, which, according to the Buzandaran Patmutʻiwnkʻ and Movses Khorenatsi, he populated by granting amnesty to any criminals that would settle there, as well as debtors, slaves, and others. Suren Yeremian and other historians have suggested that it is likely that Arshakavan was populated mainly by unfree peasants fleeing their masters, who were then given certain privileges. Arshak's plan was opposed by the clergy and nobility, who destroyed the city and killed its inhabitants.

Arshak was summoned by Constantius II to Caeserea in 360 and warned to remain loyal to Rome, after which, per Ammianus Marcellinus, the Armenian king "never dared to violate any of his promises." According to the Buzandaran Patmutʻiwnkʻ, Arshak enjoyed good relations with Shapur II for some time and even sent a detachment to help Shapur against the Romans at one point, (Note: See Faustus of Byzantium, History of the Armenians, IV.20 (or Garsoïan 1989, pp. 149–151). Arshak's supposed joint attack on Nisibis with the Persians, attested by Faustus, has been dated variously. Several scholars have argued that Arshak II joined the Persians on their campaign in 359, but Garsoïan considers this "highly improbable" and writes that the battle, "if it has any historical basis whatsoever, must be the distorted memory of an episode in the siege of Nisibis in 350, or even of the campaign of 297," subsequently integrated into oral traditions about Arshak's reign.) but that hostilities began between Armenia and Persia due to the scheming of Arshak's father-in-law through Parandzem, Andovk Siuni, and the Persian-backed revolt of Meruzhan Artsruni. (Note: Meruzhan is depicted as an apostate and traitorous vassal of the Armenian king by the classical Armenian historians. However, he may have been following an independent foreign policy as the lord of one of the Satrapies which had been detached from the Arsacid Armenian kingdom after the Treaty of Nisibis of 298.) In 363, the Romans and Sasanian empires clashed again, and Arshak raided Persian territory in support of Emperor Julian's campaign. The campaign ended with Julian's death, and the new Roman emperor Jovian was forced to negotiate an undesirable peace with Shapur II in which, among other concessions, Rome renounced its alliance with Armenia, leaving the country to face Shapur alone. The Armenian chief general (sparapet) Vasak Mamikonian successfully defended the central province of Ayrarat and won a number of victories over Persian armies, which were joined by Armenian forces led by Meruzhan Artsruni and Vahan Mamikonian, brother of Vasak. Nevertheless, more and more Armenian nakharars went over to the Persian side. Faced with this desperate situation, Arshak agreed to go to Persia for peace negotiations with Shapur c. 367 after receiving guarantees for his safety. When Arshak II arrived with Vasak Mamikonian, he was imprisoned and possibly blinded, while his general was skinned alive.

After eliminating Arshak, Shapur laid waste to Armenia, destroying its major cities and deporting their inhabitants to Persia. Meruzhan Artsruni and Vahan Mamikonian, who had renounced Christianity, were installed as governors. Christian Armenians were persecuted and many churches were destroyed and replaced with Zoroastrian fire temples. Arshak's queen Parandzem and his son Pap continued to hold out in the fortress of Artagers for some time, perhaps until early 370, when the fortress was captured and Parandzem was taken to Persia to be put to death. Pap, however, had earlier managed to escape to Roman territory, and returned to Armenia to take the throne with the help of the emperor Valens in 370/371 (another estimate place Pap's ascension to the throne in 367/368).

== Imprisonment and death ==
Arshak was sent to the Castle of Oblivion (Armenian: berd An(y)ush) in Khuzestan. The Buzandaran Patmutʻiwnkʻ gives an account of his death in captivity. Sometime in 369 or 370, an Armenian eunuch named Drastamat, who had been a great court official under Arshak and his father, visited the imprisoned king. The king reminisced about his glory days and, feeling depressed, took his visitor's knife and killed himself. Drastamat, moved by what he had just witnessed, took the knife from Arshak II's chest and stabbed himself as well. An almost identical account of Arshak's death is given in The Persian War of the Byzantine historian Procopius, who cites a certain Armenian history and may have been (but, per Garsoïan, was not necessarily) familiar with the Buzandaran Patmutʻiwnkʻ. The Roman historian Ammianus Marcellinus gives an alternative account where Arshak is captured, blinded and executed by the Persians.

== Legacy ==
Arshak II is held in poor regard and is described as sinful by the classical Armenian historians, which can partly be explained by his acrimonious relationship with the Armenian church. The Roman historian Ammianus Marcellinus presents Arshak in a more positive light. M. L. Chaumont characterizes Arshak as "weak and indecisive," while Vahan M. Kurkjian writes that although the Armenian king did not lack "intelligence, courage and will power [...] he committed many mistakes and cruelties which overshadowed his virtues and contributed to his tragic end."

== Physical appearance ==
In the Buzandaran Patmutʻiwnkʻ, Arshak II is described by Parandzem as unattractively hairy and dark.

== Family and issue ==
Arshak II had two known wives: the Greek noblewoman Olympias and the Armenian noblewoman Parandzem. The chronology of his marriages is unclear, and it is possible that he had more than one wife simultaneously, despite his Christian faith and in accordance with Iranian tradition. He was married to Olympias until her death in 361, purportedly by poisoning at the instigation of Parandzem. Arshak's other known wife, Parandzem, was a member of the Siuni dynasty and the widow of Arshak's nephew Gnel. Parandzem bore Arshak a son, Pap, who would succeed his father as king of Armenia. Armenian historian Hakob Manandian considered it possible that Pap was actually the son of Parandzem by her first husband Gnel. Historian Albert Stepanyan argues that Pap was in fact Arshak's son, but that he was initially legally regarded as Gnel's son, as Arshak had married Paradzem in an Iranian-style levirate marriage called stūr ī būtak or čakarīh, whereby a childless widow would marry one of her late husband's agnatic relatives to provide her deceased husband with an heir. For these reasons, Arshak faced serious obstacles in legitimizing Pap as his legal son and heir. According to Stepanyan, it was only after the death of Olympias that Parandzem was made a full royal consort and her son Pap was recognized as crown prince of Armenia. Nina Garsoïan, on the other hand, writes that Pap must have been Arshak's legitimate son and heir, as even the sources extremely hostile to Pap never question his legitimacy. She proposes another hypothesis according to which Arshak and Parandzem had Pap around 350, after which Parandzem was passed to Gnel in a temporary marriage and later taken back by Arshak, thus explaining how Pap could have been born prior to Gnel's death in 359.

Arshak apparently had another son—not mentioned by name in the Buzandaran Patmutʻiwnkʻ and Movses Khorenatsi's history—who may have fathered Varazdat, Pap's successor as king. This other son is called Trdat in another Armenian source, the anonymous Vita of St. Nerses.

== Cultural depictions ==
In 1630, a tragedy about Arshak II by the Jesuit Claude Delidel was performed at the College of Clermont. Arshak II is the titular character of the first Armenian classical opera, Arshak II, composed by Tigran Chukhajian to a bilingual Italian-Armenian libretto by Tovmas Terzian in 1868. Bedros Minasian and Mkrtich Beshiktashlian wrote plays where Arshak is the titular character. He is also a character in the play Metsn Nerses kam Hayastani Barerare (Nerses the Great or the patron of Armenia) by Sargis Vanandetsi. The author and playwright Perch Zeytuntsyan wrote a play titled Avervats kaghaki araspele (The legend of the ruined city) and a novel titled Arshak Yerkrord (Arshak the Second) about the Armenian king in 1975 and 1977, respectively. Stepan Zoryan's novel Hayots berd (Armenian fortress) is also about Arshak II.

== Notes ==
Arshak II Arsacid dynasty of Armenia Born: unknown Died: 415/418
Preceded by Tiran II 339–350	Arshak II; 350–368	Succeeded by Pap 370–374
