= Vasak I Mamikonian =

Armenian military officer

Vasak I Mamikonian (died c. 367) was an Armenian military officer from the Mamikonian family, who occupied the hereditary office of sparapet (generalissimo or grand marshal) of the Kingdom of Armenia under the Arsacid king Arshak II (reigned c. 350–367/8). According to the Armenian history Buzandaran Patmut‘iwnk‘ (Epic Histories), which may have been composed c. 470, Vasak was known for playing a disruptive role between Arshak II and the Sasanian monarch Shapur II (r. 309–379), and for orchestrating many Armenian victories over the Sasanian army. Vasak was put to death in c. 367 by Shapur following the capture of Arshak.

== Biography ==
Vasak was a sepuh (prince) of the Mamikonian house. He was the younger brother of Vardan, the Mamikonian nahapet (clan head), and the half-brother of Vahan Mamikonian, who defected to the Persian side during Shapur II's invasion of Armenia. His sister, Hamazaspuhi, was married to Garegin, lord of Rshtunik. Buzandaran Patmut‘iwnk‘ also mentions another brother of Vasak, the commander Bagos. Ferdinand Justi and Cyril Toumanoff thought that Vasak was the son of the previous Mamikonian sparapet Artavazd II, but historian Nina Garsoïan states that this seems impossible because of Artavazd's short lifespan.

Vasak, who appears to have already been a commander under Artavazd II, served as the sparapet of Armenia from the latter part of the reign of Tiran until the end of that of Arshak II. Vasak's brother Vardan seems to have one of the pro-Persian magnates of Armenia, and he served as an ambassador between Arshak II and the Sasanian king Shapur II. According to Buzandaran Patmut‘iwnk‘, Vasak accused Vardan of treason with the Persians and desiring the kill the Armenian king. Arshak then sent Vasak with a force against Vardan in the Mamikonian holding of Tayk; Vardan was taken by surprise and killed.

Shapur II invaded Armenia after the defeat of the Roman emperor Julian's Persian expedition in 363. Buzandaran Patmut‘iwnk‘ attributes a number of victories over the Persians to Vahan. In particular, Vasak and his brother Bagos are said to have commanded a 60,000 strong Armenian force that defeated a large Persian army in the central province of Ayrarat; this battle is placed in the spring of 364 in the Armenian Soviet Encyclopedia. Nevertheless, more and more of the Armenian magnates abandoned Arshak, and the Armenian king was eventually lured to the Sasanian court c. 367. He was accompanied there by Vasak, and both were arrested by the Persians. Arshak was imprisoned in the so-called Castle of Oblivion in Khuzistan, while Vasak was flayed alive. According to Buzandaran Patmut‘iwnk‘, and Vasak's skin was filled with straw and placed in Arshak's cell. Vasak (as Bassákios) is mentioned in the De bello Persico of the Byzantine historian Procopius (6th century), who likewise writes that the Armenian general was flayed alive by the Persians. Vasak was succeeded in the office of sparapet by his son Mushegh Mamikonian.

Vasak became the subject of epic traditions, which were presumably part of an epic cycle (called the "Mamikonian Geste" by Nina Garsoïan) about the successive generations of Mamikonian sparapets and their exploits. Several episodes in Buzandaran Patmut‘iwnk‘ derive from these epic stories.
