= Tigran Chukhajian =

Ottoman-Armenian composer and conductor

Tigran (Dikran) Chukhajian
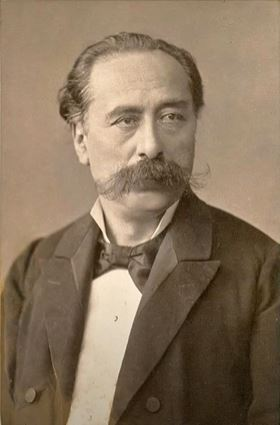
- Born: 1837; Constantinople, Ottoman Empire
- Died: March 11, 1898 (aged 60–61); Smyrna, Ottoman Empire
- Other names: Dikran Chouhajian, Tigran Tchoukhajian, Dikran Çuhacıyan
- Occupations: Composer, conductor

Tigran Chukhajian (Armenian: Տիգրան Չուխաճեան; Turkish: Dikran Çuhacıyan; 1837 – March 11, 1898) was an Ottoman Armenian composer and conductor, and the founder of the first opera institution in the Ottoman Empire.

== Biography ==
Tchouhadjian was born in Constantinople. He studied at composer Gabriel Yeranian's class, then had classes in Milan. Along with other Armenian intellectuals of that period he fought for the development of national culture, organized Armenian musical societies, theatres, schools, papers and free concerts. In 1862, he took over publication of the Armenian musical journal Armenian Lyre.In his works, Tchouhadjian used the elements of European musical techniques and eastern music elements He is an author of pieces for piano, songs and romances, chamber and symphonic works, operas. His most successful opera was Leblebici hor-hor agha (1875), it was premiered at the French Theatre in Constantinople, it was so successful that during the season it was performed more than hundred times and during the month Ramadan it was performed every single night (Zemire, 1890) etc. He died in Smyrna (now İzmir). Chukhajian is buried in the Armenian cemetery of İzmir.

He created the first Armenian opera, Arshak II (1868, partially staged in 1873), based on the historical figure King Arsaces II (Arshak II).Arshak II was banned because of its potential political ramifications. Nevertheless, Tchouhadjian changed some of the scenes and managed to convince Naum to allow the opera to be performed in his theatre by an Italian opera group known as Olimpia. The score was considered lost, but was discovered in 1942 and performed in 1945 in a revised version at the Armenian Opera Theater opera theater in Yerevan. Arshak II continued in the repertoire of the Yerevan Opera Theater. In 2001, it was staged at the San Francisco Opera.

Tchouhadjian is also remembered as the composer of what may have been the first original opera in Turkish, Arif'in Hilesi (Arif's Deception), based on Nikolai Gogol's The Government Inspector .The opera caused a conflict between Chouhajian and Gullu Agop whether it was a vaudeville or opera. It was performed in the Gedikpaşa theatre.

== Selected compositions ==
=== Operas ===
- Arshak II (1868)
- Arif'in Hilesi (1874)
- Leblebidji Hor-Hor Agha (1875)
- Zemire (1890)
- Indiana (1897)

=== Solo piano ===
- Mouvement Perpetuel
- Cascade de couz
- Illusion
- Apres La Gavotte
- Deux Fantaisies Orientales
- La Lyre Orientale, Laura
- Rapelle-tois
- Romans
- Impromptu in B♭ minor ‘Cascade De Couz’ (1887)
- Danse Caractéristique in A minor ‘L’orientale’ (1891)
- Grande Valse Fantastique in A minor ‘Illusions’ (1888)
- Tarantelle in B♭ minor (1887)
- Caprice in E minor ‘La Lyre Orientale’ (1894)
- Mazurka De Salon ‘Mignon’ (1887)
- Une Gavotte De Plus in E♭ major (1883)
- Polka in F major ‘La Gaité’ (1892)
- Proti Polka in G major (1892)
- Funeral March in d minor (1884)
- Fantaisie Orientale No. 1 in A minor ‘Sur des Motifs Turcs’ (1895)
- Fantaisie Orientale No. 2 in A minor ‘Sur des Motifs Turcs’ (1895)

== Bibliography ==
- Sarkisyan, Svetlana (2001). "Chukhajian, Tigran Gevorki". Grove Music Online. Oxford University Press. doi:10.1093/gmo/9781561592630.article.05728.(subscription required)
- Karadagli, Ozgecan. “From Empire to Republic: Western Art Music, Nationalism, and the Merging Mediation of Saygun’s Op.26 Yunus Emre Oratorio.” University of Alberta Libraries, 2017. https://doi.org/10.7939/R3FQ9QK4S.
- Karadagli, Ozgecan. 2003. “Türkiye’ye Müzikli Sahne Sanatlarının Girisi Dikran Çuhacıyan Öncesi ve Sonrasi. Istanbul: Unpublished Master's Thesis.
- Karadagli, O. (2020). Western Performing Arts in the Late Ottoman Empire: Accommodation and Formation. Context, 46, 17-33.
