= Vardandukht =

Vardandukht (4th century), was a Queen consort of Armenia, as the wife of Arsaces III (Arshak III) who was the last serving Roman Client King of Arsacid Armenia. Arsaces III reigned from 378 until his death in 387.

== Life ==
Vardandukht was the daughter of the great sparapet (chief general) Manuel Mamikonian of the pro-Roman, powerful and wealthy Mamikonian family by a mother whose name is unknown. She was born and raised in Armenia.

The previous Roman client Armenian King Papas (Pap) was assassinated in 374. As Arsaces III and his younger brother, Vologases, were both too young to rule and succeed their father, the Roman emperor Valens had sent their paternal first cousin Varasdates (Varazdat) to occupy the Armenian throne. Their cousin who was a young man highly reputed for his mental and physical gifts had lived in Rome for an unknown period of time. Varasdates began to rule under the regency of Mushegh I Mamikonian.

=== Queen ===
In 378 with the failed reign of Varasdates and the murder of Mushegh Mamikonian, who was Vardandukht’s paternal uncle, her father, Manuel filled his late brother’s position of sparapet. Manuel, furious at the Armenian King, with a military force drove out Varasdates from Armenia back to Rome. Manuel raised Arsaces III and his brother Vologases to the throne as co-kings of Armenia, under the nominal regency of their mother Zarmandukht.

To end the political anarchy in the country as Manuel being now the powerful regent-in-charge of Armenia, Manuel married Arsaces III to Vardandukht and he married Vologases to the daughter of Sahak from the Bagratuni dynasty. Through marriage, Vardandukht became a relation to the ruling Arsacid dynasty of Armenia and a high status woman in Armenian society. Not much is known on her relationship with Arsaces III; they had no children.

The Mamikonian government brought peace, stability to Armenia in which Manuel guided the country wisely. Manuel treated Arsaces III, Vologases and Zarmandukht with honor. He raised Arsaces III and Vologases and Manuel nurtured them as if they were his own children.

=== Later life ===
In 386, Vologases died without leaving an heir and sometime later, Manuel died. Vardandukht and Arsaces III were at Manuel’s bedside as he laid sick and dying. After this moment, no more is known on Vardandukht. From 386 until 387, Arsaces III became the sole-ruler of Armenia, which occurred at this time the Sassanid invasions from Persia of Armenia. From this invasion, the authority of Arsaces III became lessened as he only maintained Western Armenia, in which his small kingdom was of a line from Erzurum to Mush. Sometime in 387 Arsaces III died, without leaving an heir. Western Armenia was annexed and became a province of the Byzantine Empire. Eastern Armenia was annexed by the Sassanid Empire and the remaining ruling Arsacid monarchs in Eastern Armenia became Client Kings of Armenia under Sassanid rule.

== Sources ==
- Faustus of Byzantium, History of the Armenians, 5th century
- Armenian Girl Names – Vardandukht
- Armenian Girl Names – Vardandush
- R.G. Hovannisian, The Armenian People From Ancient to Modern Times, Volume I: The Dynastic Periods: From Antiquity to the Fourteenth Century, Palgrave Macmillan, 2004
- A. Topchyan, The Problem of the Greek Sources of Movses Xorenac’i’s History of Armenia, Peeters Publishers, 2006
- V.M. Kurkjian, A History of Armenia, Indo-European Publishing, 2008
- R.P. Adalian, Historical Dictionary of Armenia, Scarecrow Press, 2010

== See also ==
- Arsacid dynasty of Armenia
- Mamikonian
