= Khosrov IV =

King of Armenia from 384/5 to 389

King of Armenia
- First reign: 384/5–389
- Predecessor: Vologases
- Successor: Vramshapuh
- Second reign: 414–415 or 417–418
- Predecessor: Vramshapuh
- Successor: Shapuh
- Died: 415 or 418
- Consort: Zruandukht
- House: Arsacid
- Father: Varazdat (presumed)

Khosrov IV (Armenian: Խոսրով IV (died 415 or 418), called Khosrov III in some sources, was a noble of the Arsacid dynasty who served as the Sasanian client king of Armenia from 384/385 until 389 and again from 414 to 415 or 417 to 418. He was appointed king of Armenia by the Sasanian king, who gave Khosrov his sister in marriage. During his reign, Armenia was partitioned into Roman and Sasanian sectors with the Peace of Acilisene in 387. Khosrov reigned in the eastern, Sasanian part, while his relative Arshak III reigned in the western, Roman part. He reigned for about five years before being denounced by the Armenian nobility for conspiring with Rome and deposed and deported to Iran. He was briefly restored to the throne after the death of his brother and successor Vramshapuh, but he died not long after that.

== Biography ==
=== Origins ===
Khosrov IV was a member of the Arsacid dynasty of Armenia. His parentage is not mentioned in the old Armenian sources. The 5th–6th-century Armenian historian Ghazar Parpetsi calls him the brother of Vramshapuh, who succeeded Khosrov as king in 389. Ferdinand Justi, Cyril Toumanoff and Christian Settipani assume that Khosrov was the son of the earlier Armenian king Varazdat.

=== Reign ===
The division of Armenia after the Peace of Acilisene Khosrov's enthronement is placed before the official partition of Armenia in 387 in the Buzandaran Patmutʻiwnkʻ, but Movses Khorenatsi's history places it after this event. Presumably, it occurred after the death of Vologases (Vagharshak), who was co-ruler of Armenia along with his brother Arshak III under the regency of Manuel Mamikonian. According to Nina Garsoïan, the de facto partition of Armenia had probably occurred already in 384/5, around which time Manuel died, Arshak was forced to flee west to Ekeghiats by the pro-Persian faction of Armenian nakharars (high-ranking nobles), and Khosrov was appointed king of the eastern part of Armenia with a Persian tutor. In 387, the partition was formalized with the Peace of Acilisene (Ekeghiats), with the new border running north to south from a point east of Karin (modern Erzurum) to Mesopotamia west of Nisibis. Khosrov IV kept the Arsacid capitals of Artashat and Dvin in his kingdom, while Arshak ruled in Roman-controlled Ekeghiats until his death 390. (Note: No new king was appointed in the Roman part of Armenia after the death of Arshak III. Instead, the Romans appointed a Comes Armeniae who probably oversaw the Armenian nakharars like the Sasanian marzpan. Eventually, Roman Armenia was transformed into ordinary provinces of the Eastern Roman Empire. Khorenatsi reports that Khosrov actually extended his rule over Roman Armenia as well after Arshak's death, although Robert W. Thomson considers this to be false.) (Note: Khorenatsi's report of a war between Khosrov and Arshak which Khosrov won is considered false by Hakob Manandian, who argues that the two client-kings could not have independently waged war against each other. Such a war is not mentioned by Ghazar Parpetsi, whose history covers the period from the partition of Armenia to 485.) The partition of Armenia was followed by the final stage of Arsacid rule in Armenia.

The Sasanian king Shapur III gave his sister Zruandukht as wife to Khosrov IV, as well as a large army to protect Armenia and a tutor from the House of Zik. Khosrov reigned for about five years, until 389, when he was denounced by the Armenian nobility for conspiring with Rome and deposed and deported to Iran. He was replaced by his brother Vramshapuh as King of Armenia. Movses Khorenatsi adds that Khosrov's fall from power was because of his appointment of Sahak I as catholicos without Sasanian approval. Per Khorenatsi, he was imprisoned in the Castle of Oblivion in Khuzistan. (Note: Khorenatsi also relates an episode in which the Armenian noble Pargev Amatuni attempted to free Khosrov from captivity while he was being transported, but was himself captured, executed and his corpse placed in front of Khosrov in his prison, just as Vasak Mamikonian's corpse was placed before Arshak II during his imprisonment in the Castle of Oblivion.) After the death of Vramshapuh, Khosrov was released from exile and restored to the throne in 414 or 417. According to Khorenatsi, this occurred after Catholicos Sahak visited the court of the Sasanian king Yazdegerd I to request Khosrov's release. However, Khosrov died not long thereafter (eight months according to Ghazar Parpetsi, one year per Khorenatsi) in 415 or 418. His death was followed by a short period of direct Sasanian rule under Yazdegerd's son Shapuh, but in 422, Vramshapuh's son Artaxias IV was appointed king of Armenia.

== The Symbolism of the "Castle of Oblivion" ==
The Castle of Oblivion (known as Anyush or Andmsh in Armenian sources) mentioned in the text was far more than just a prison. It was one of the most severe and dreaded fortresses in Sasanian Persia. Its name stems from a strict law: it was forbidden for anyone to speak the name of a prisoner held there—they were meant to be literally forgotten by the world. Historically, this is the same location where the earlier Armenian King Arshak II was imprisoned and eventually died. The fact that Khosrov IV was released from this place years later was an exceptional and rare occurrence in Persian history.

== Cultural Significance ==
Although Khosrov IV’s reign was relatively short, it marked the beginning of a cultural awakening that ultimately led to the creation of the Armenian alphabet. He worked closely with Sahak Parthev to strengthen the Armenian Church and national identity. His brother and successor, King Vramshapuh, continued the church-building and educational programs initiated by Khosrov and Sahak, providing the political support necessary for Mesrop Mashtots to complete his mission.

== Notes ==
Khosrov IV Arsacid's dinasty Born: unknown Died: 415/418
Preceded by Arshak III 378-387	Khosrov IV; 387-392	Succeeded by Vramshapuh 392-414
