= Mushegh I Mamikonian =

Armenian military officer

Sparapet Mushegh I Mamikonian
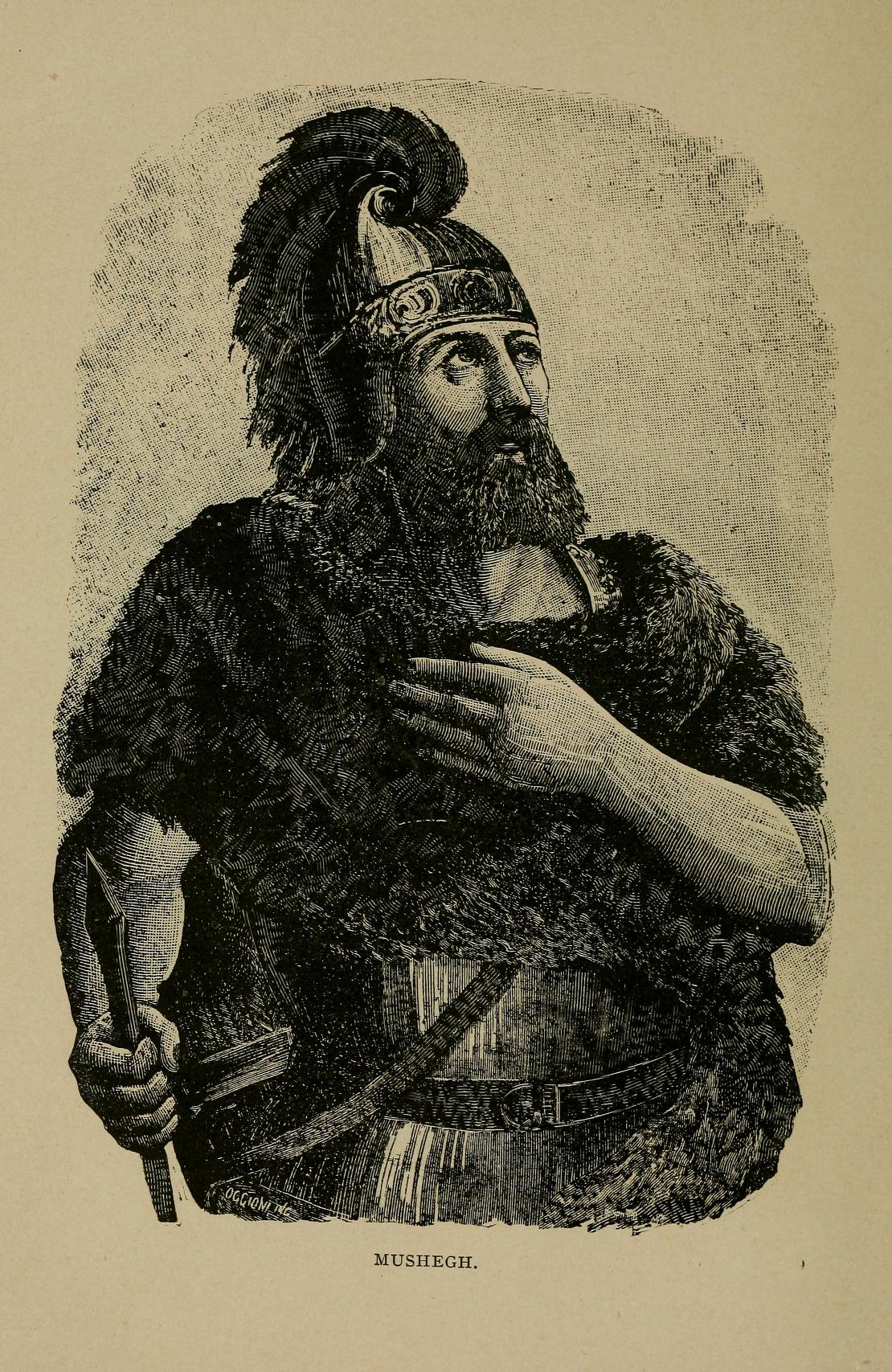
- 19th-century illustration of Mushegh I Mamikonian.
- Died: 377/8
- Relatives: Vasak I Mamikonian (father)
- Military career
- Allegiance: Kingdom of Armenia
- Rank: Sparapet (generalissimo)
- Conflicts: Battle of Bagavan

Mushegh I Mamikonian (Note: Old Armenian: Մուշեղ Մամիկոնեան, romanized: Mušeł Mamikonean) (also spelled Mushel; d. 377/8) was an Armenian military officer from the Mamikonian family who occupied the hereditary office of sparapet (generalissimo) of the Kingdom of Armenia under the Arsacid kings Pap (r. 370–374) and Varazdat (r. 374–378). He took part in the Armenian resistance against the forces of the Sasanian monarch Shapur II (r. 309–379), notably taking part in the Battle of Bagavan, where the Iranian forces were defeated. He was the regent of Armenia under the young and inexperienced Varazdat, who eventually suspected him of posing a danger to his rule, and thus had him executed, in 377/8.

Mushegh may be identical with the Artabanes mentioned in the works of the contemporary Roman historian Ammianus Marcellinus.

== Background ==
Mushegh was a son of the Armenian sparapet (generalissimo) Vasak I Mamikonian. The Mamikonian family controlled the northwestern Tayk province near the Iberian border. They also hereditarily held the office of sparapet, which was the most important office after that of the king. Vasak was the leader of the pro-Roman party in Armenia which supported King Arshak II (r. 350–368). However, with the death of Roman emperor Julian at the Battle of Samarra in 363, Roman forces withdrew from Armenia, thus exposing it to the Sasanian Empire. This eventually forced Arshak II, as well as many Armenian nobles, such as Vasak, to leave for the Iranian court to pledge their allegiance to the Sasanian King of Kings (shahanshah) Shapur II (r. 309–379). However, Arshak II's refusal to accept Shapur II's demands resulted in his imprisonment in the Castle of Oblivion, while Vasak was tortured to death. With the elimination of Arshak II (who, according to Faustus of Byzantium, soon committed suicide, or, per Ammianus Marcellinus, was put to death), Shapur II sent his forces into Armenia.

== Biography ==
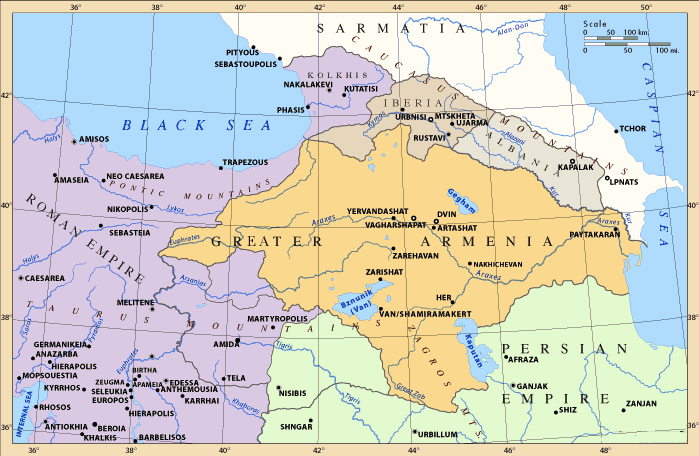
Map of Armenia and its surroundings in the late 4th century (based on a map in Robert H. Hewsen's Armenia: A Historical Atlas, see there for explanatory notes)

Arshak II's widow, Queen Parandzem, organized a resistance and sent a delegation under Mushegh to the Romans to ask for help on the behalf of Arshak II's son Pap. The Romans, however, were reluctant to engage in a war and support Armenia, which had been devastated by the Iranian forces. In the winter of 369/370, Parandzem was raped and killed by Iranian forces, while numerous sites, including the capital of Artaxata, were destroyed. Pap fled to Roman territory, and later returned in 371 with help from the Roman emperor Valens (r. 364–378), and Pap ascended the Armenian throne. In the same year, a combined Armenian-Roman army defeated the Iranians at the Battle of Bagavan. Mushegh, who took part in the battle, wounded the Albanian king Urnayr (a vassal of Shapur II), but allowed him to escape. The 5th-century Armenian historian Faustus gives a large amount of credit for the victory to Mushegh.

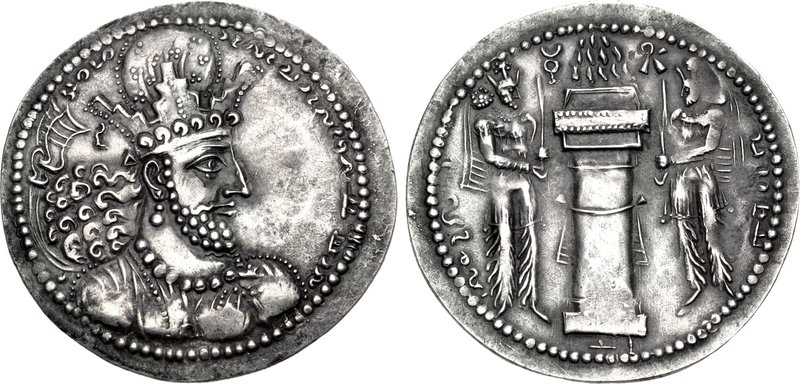
Coin of the Sasanian shahanshah Shapur II (r. 309–379)

With this victory, many of the Armenian nakharars (magnates) who had previously defected to Shapur II in 360s, were now under Mushegh's control. Mushegh, however, was greatly criticized by Pap for sparing Urnayr. However, they ultimately reconciled, with Pap providing Mushegh with many gifts, honors and villages.

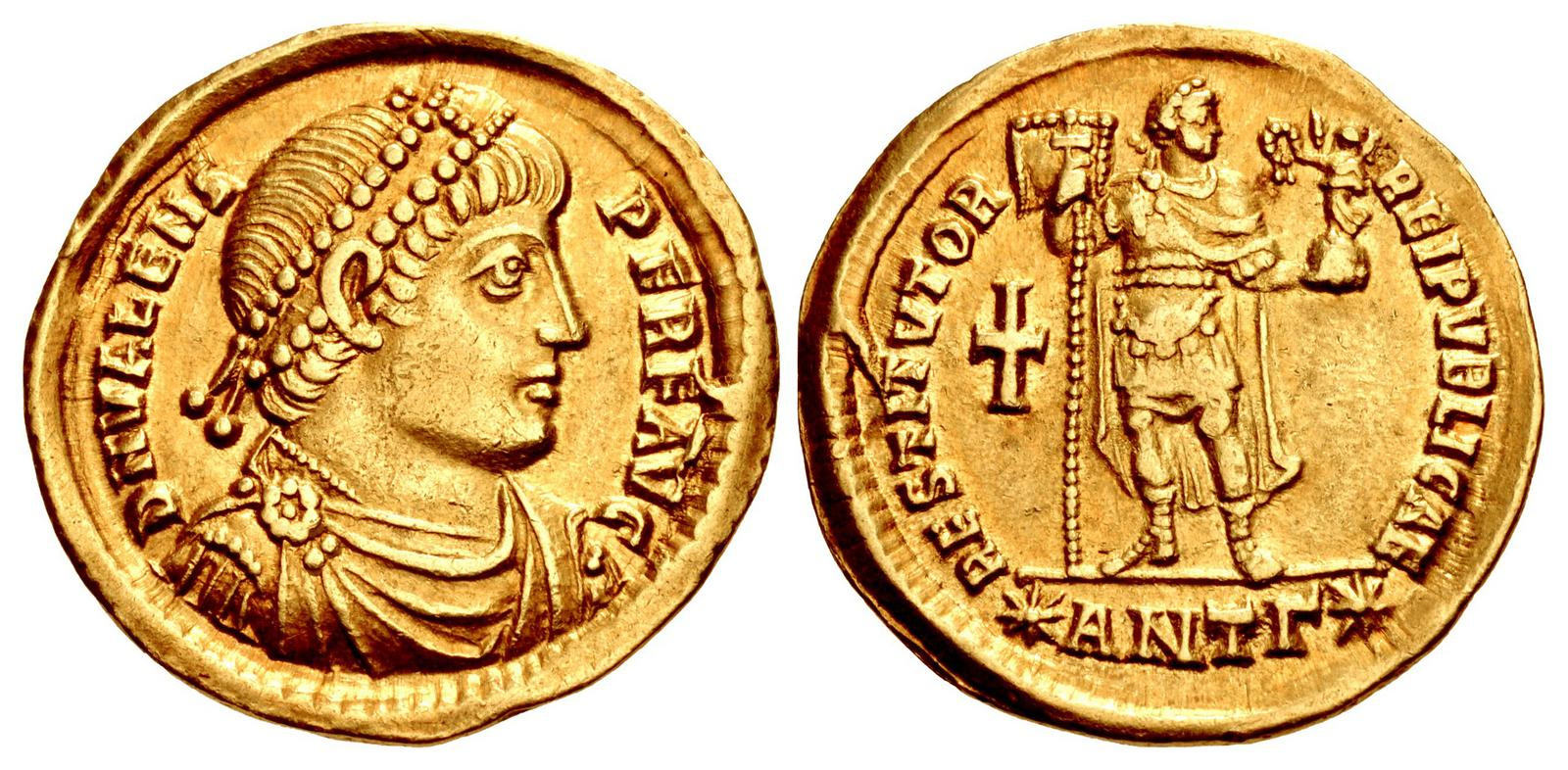
Coin of the Roman emperor Valens (r. 364–378)

When Urnayr returned to Albania, he sent a message to Mushegh thanking him for sparing his life, and also informed him of a surprise attack planned by Shapur II. According to Faustus, Mushegh assembled all the Armenian troops, which numbered about 90,000. According to Ian Hughes, "If P'awstos' numbers are correct, it would appear that for this conflict the entire army of Armenia was gathered to fight Shapur, leaving all other borders undefended – a risk that Pap and Mushegh were willing to take in face of the Persian threat." Mushegh was also reinforced by a Roman force led by Terentius. The Iranian army—led by Shapur II himself—was defeated and routed at the border near Ganzak. Mushegh and Terentius then left the hayr mardpet (grand chamberlain) Cylaces (Glak) with an army of 30,000 to protect the border. Cylaces soon sent messengers to Shapur, promising to betray Pap, Mushegh, and Terentius to the Iranians. However, this ploy was discovered by Pap, who had Cylaces assassinated.

According to Faustus, Mushegh reclaimed several of Armenia's former territories after the battles with the Persians, including the southern principalities of Arzanene and Corduene, which had been ceded to the Persians by Jovian in 363. Faustus writes that Mushegh brutally punished the provinces that had revolted against the monarchy, forcing the pro-Persian nakharars to submit to royal authority. Mushegh is also said to have campaigned against the neighboring kingdoms of Iberia and Albania to restore the Kura River as Armenia's northeastern border. However, the actual extent of Mushegh's reconquests is uncertain and likely exaggerated by Faustus. (Note: Faustus names the following territories among those recaptured by Mushegh: part of Atrpatakan, Noshirakan, Kordukʻ (Corduene), Kordikʻ, Tmorikʻ, "the land of the Markʻ (Medes)", Artsʻakh, Utikʻ, Shakashēn, Gardmanadzor, Koghtʻ, Kasp (Pʻaytakaran), Gugarkʻ, Aghdznikʻ (Arzanene), Mets Tsopʻkʻ (Greater Sophene), Angeghtun, and Andzitʻ. Manandian rules out the reconquest of Arzanene and Corduene (which had been ceded to Persia by Rome in 363), as well as the capture of Greater Sophene, Angeghtun (Ingilene) and Andzitʻ (Anzitene), which had been annexed by Rome. Chaumont considers the reconquest of territories from Albania (Artsʻakh, Utikʻ, Shakashēn, Gardman, Koghtʻ) to be unlikely. Robert H. Hewsen, on the other hand, accepts the reconquest of Arzanene, Artsʻakh, Utikʻ, Shakashēn, Gardman, and Koghtʻ in c. 371, while noting that these territories would soon be lost by Armenia again c. 387.)

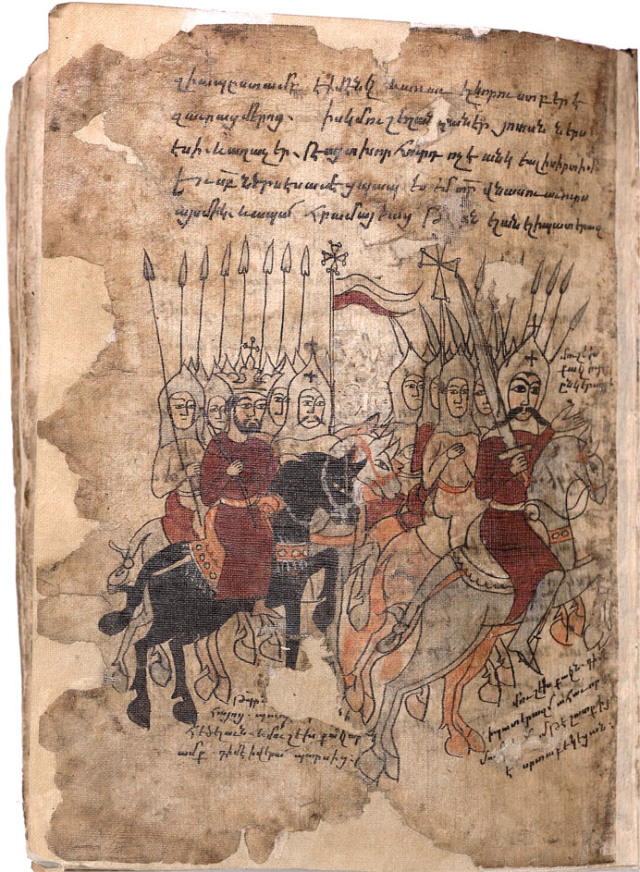
A 16th-century miniature depicting King Pap (left) and sparapet Mushegh (right, holding sword)

Peace was subsequently made between Iran and Rome, with Armenia becoming a protectorate of the latter once more. However, in 374 or 375, Pap was murdered at the behest of Valens due to his disobedience towards the Roman emperor. The Romans then installed another Arsacid named Varazdat on the Armenian throne, with Mushegh becoming his regent. In 377, Valens was forced to call his forces in Armenia back to wage war with the Goths, which quickly resulted in the destabilization of Armenia. Varazdat, who was young and impressionable, was by convinced by a group of Armenian nobles that Mushegh posed a danger to his rule, and had played a part in Pap's murder. Varazdat therefore had Mushegh killed at a banquet and appointed his tutor (dayeak) Bat Saharuni as the new sparapet, in violation of tradition. Mushegh's family and relatives put his body on a high tower, believing that the spirits (aralez) would descend and bring him back to life.

According to historian Hakob Manandian's interpretation, Mushegh and the pro-Roman party had lost faith in the viability of the Arsacid monarchy and decided to solidify Roman presence in the country at the expense of monarchical authority, specifically through the establishment of Roman fortified settlements throughout Armenia. Manandian argues that this policy would have ultimately resulted in Armenia's annexation by Rome, and that Varazdat's enmity with Mushegh was the result of the pro-Roman party's policy and the king's efforts to preserve royal authority. After Mushegh's murder, his kinsman Manuel Mamikonian returned from captivity in Iran and drove Varazdat out of the country to avenge Mushegh. Manuel spared the life of the young king, but killed Bat Saharuni. Manuel then placed Varazdat's young cousins Arshak and Vagharshak on the throne.

Mushegh may be identical with the Artabanes mentioned in the works of the contemporary Roman historian Ammianus Marcellinus. Both were military officers; both are said to have led the negotiations with Valens which resulted in Pap's return to Armenia; and both were accused of treason. However, Mushegh was murdered after Pap's death, while Artabanes was killed by Pap's orders on suspicion of treason. Lenski believes that Artabanes may be identified with aspects of two of the Mamikonian sparapets mentioned by Faustus for this period: Mushegh and Vahan Mamikonian, the Apostate. Similarly, Robert Bedrosian suggests that in Faustus's account, Artabanes is split into the figures of Mushegh and Vahan, with the former remaining loyal to the monarchy and the latter collaborating with the Persians, thus "spreading the responsibility" for Artabanes's duplicitous actions. Bedrosian explains the difference in timing of the deaths of Mushegh and Artabanes as a reflection of Faustus's biases; in Faustus's account, Mushegh cannot be killed by Pap, a true Arsacid ruler, so the murder is instead attributed to his successor Varazdat, whom Faustus describes as illegitimate.

== Legacy ==
Mushegh is the hero of the history attributed to Faustus of Byzantium, which depicts him as possessing every virtue, including the supernatural kʻajutʻiwn (literally 'bravery, valor') which normally belongs only to the king. As historian Nina Garsoïan writes, "This apotheosis, drawn from traditional Iranian beliefs and following in every detail the royal Sasanian iconography, as well as the account of the pagan practices that attended Mušeł's burial […], are probably derived from oral epic accounts current in Armenia at the time." He is almost entirely absent from the Armenian history of Movses Khorenatsi, which is hostile to the Mamikonians.

Mushegh Mamikonian is one of the main characters in the historical novel Samuel by the 19th-century Armenian writer Raffi. Mushegh's activities during a complex period of Armenian history are also presented in the historical-epic novels Hayots’ berdë (The fortress of Armenia) and Pap t’agavor (King Pap) by Stepan Zoryan.

== Bibliography ==
=== Ancient works ===
- P'awstos Buzand [Faustus of Byzantium] (1985). History of the Armenians. Translated by Bedrosian, Robert. New York.

=== Modern works ===
- Bedrosian, Robert (1983). "The Sparapetut'iwn in Armenia in the Fourth and Fifth Centuries" (PDF). Armenian Review. 36 (2): 6–46.
- Chaumont, M. L. (1985). "Albania". In Yarshater, Ehsan (ed.). Encyclopædia Iranica. Vol. I/8: Alafrank–Alp Arslan. London and New York: Routledge & Kegan Paul. pp. 806–810. ISBN 978-0-71009-097-3.
- Chaumont, M. L. (1986). "Armenia and Iran ii. The pre-Islamic period". In Yarshater, Ehsan (ed.). Encyclopædia Iranica. Vol. II/4: Architecture IV–Armenia and Iran IV. London and New York: Routledge & Kegan Paul. pp. 418–438. ISBN 978-0-71009-104-8.
- Daryaee, Touraj (2014). Sasanian Persia: The Rise and Fall of an Empire. I.B.Tauris. pp. 1–240. ISBN 978-0857716668.
- Garsoïan, Nina G. (1989). The Epic Histories Attributed to Pʻawstos Buzand (Buzandaran Patmutʻiwnkʻ). Cambridge, MA: Harvard University Press. ISBN 0-674-25865-7.
- Garsoïan, Nina (1997). "The Aršakuni Dynasty". In Hovannisian, Richard G. (ed.). The Armenian People from Ancient to Modern Times. Vol. 1. New York: St. Martin's Press. ISBN 0-312-10169-4.
- Garsoian, Nina (2000). "Mamikonean family". In Yarshater, Ehsan (ed.). Encyclopædia Iranica (Online ed.). Encyclopædia Iranica Foundation.
- Grousset, René (1947). Histoire de l'Arménie des origines à 1071. Paris.
- Hughes, Ian (2013). Imperial Brothers: Valentinian, Valens and the Disaster at Adrianople. Pen & Sword. ISBN 978-1848844179.
- Lenski, Noel Emmanuel (2002). Failure of Empire: Valens and the Roman state in the fourth century A.D. University of California Press. ISBN 978-0-520-23332-4.
- Manandyan, Hakob (1957). Kʻnnakan tesutʻyun hay zhoghovrdi patmutʻyan, hator B, masn A [Critical theory of the history of the Armenian people, volume II, part I] (in Armenian). Erevan: Haypethrat.
- Hewsen, Robert H. (1992). The Geography of Ananias of Širak (Ašxarhacʻoycʻ): The Long and the Short Recensions. Wiesbaden: Dr. Ludwig Reichert Verlag. ISBN 3-88226-485-3.
- Hewsen, Robert H. (2001). Armenia: A Historical Atlas. University of Chicago Press. ISBN 0-226-33228-4.
- Rapp, Stephen H. (2014). The Sasanian World through Georgian Eyes: Caucasia and the Iranian Commonwealth in Late Antique Georgian Literature. Ashgate Publishing, Ltd. ISBN 978-1472425522.
- Toumanoff, Cyril (1961). "Introduction to Christian Caucasian History: II: States and Dynasties of the Formative Period". Traditio. 17. Cambridge University Press: 1–106. doi:10.1017/S0362152900008473. JSTOR 27830424. S2CID 151524770. (registration required)
