= Zarmandukht =

Consort of Pap of Armenia

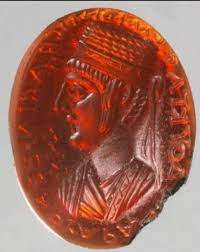
Zarmanduxt.jpg124

Zarmandukht (also spelled Zarmanduxt; fl. 383) was the consort of King Pap of Arsacid Armenia, who ruled from 370 to 374. She was regent of Armenia during the minority of her sons, co-rulers Arsaces (Arshak) III and Vologases (Vagharshak) II, who ruled from 378 to 386/387.

== Life ==
Little is known on her origins as the historical sources from this period provide no information on her life prior to marrying Pap. For Zarmandukht to have married a King of Armenia, she must have been a noblewoman of some social status and may have come from a family of some aristocratic and political influence. There is a possibility that Zarmandukht may have been a daughter of a nakharar and could have been betrothed to Pap during the kingship of his father, Arsaces II (r. 350–368).

=== Queen of Armenia ===
Zarmandukht and Pap married at an unknown date in the latter's reign. She bore Pap two sons, Arsaces III and Vologases. Little is known on her relationship with Pap. Following the assassination of Pap in 374, the Roman emperor Valens had sent the nephew of Pap, Varasdates (Varazdat) to occupy the Armenian throne, as Zarmandukht's sons with Pap were too young to rule. Varasdates was a young man highly reputed for his mental and physical gifts and had lived in Rome for an unknown period of time. Varasdates began to rule under the regency of sparapet Mushegh I Mamikonian, whose family were pro-Roman.

=== Regency ===
In 378 with the failed reign of Varasdates and the murder of his regent Mushegh Mamikonian, the latter's brother, Manuel Mamikonian, filled his late brother's position of sparapet. Manuel, furious at the Armenian king, drove Varasdates out Armenia back to Rome by military force. Manuel raised Arsaces III and Vologases to the throne as co-kings of Armenia, under the nominal regency of Zarmandukht. Manuel was the most powerful man in the country and effectively the regent of Armenia.

To end the political anarchy in the country, Manuel married Arsaces III to his daughter Vardandukht and married Vologases to the daughter of Sahak of the Bagratuni dynasty. The Mamikonian government brought peace, stability to Armenia in which Manuel guided the country wisely. Manuel treated Zarmandukht and her sons with honor. He raised Arsaces III and Vologases treated them as if they were his own children.

Manuel had given Zarmandukht the title of queen and she received the highest honors in Armenia due to her promoted status. In the year 383, the Sassanid King Shapur III had sent various royal gifts to Manuel and various members of the Armenian aristocracy. This included a crown on a mantle to a royal standard to Zarmandukht and a body of cavalry commanded by Suren Marzban. Manuel remained neutral to the Romans and the Sassanid ruling monarchs. After this moment no more is known on Zarmandukht and the date of her death is unknown.

== In the arts ==
Zarmandukht is a character in the tragedy Nerses The Great, Patron of Armenia written in 1857, by the Anatolian Armenian Playwright, Actor & Editor of the 19th century, Sargis Vanadetsi also known as Sargis Mirzayan.

== See also ==
- Varasdates (Varazdat)

== Sources ==
- Faustus of Byzantium, History of the Armenians, 5th century
- Female Armenian names – Zarmandukht
- R.G. Hovannisian, The Armenian People From Ancient to Modern Times, Volume I: The Dynastic Periods: From Antiquity to the Fourteenth Century, Palgrave Macmillan, 2004
- A. Topchyan, The Problem of the Greek Sources of Movses Xorenac'i's History of Armenia, Peeters Publishers, 2006
- V.M. Kurkjian, A History of Armenia, Indo-European Publishing, 2008
- R.P. Adalian, Historical Dictionary of Armenia, Scarecrow Press, 2010
