= Peace of Acilisene =

4th century treaty between the East Roman and Sassanid Empires

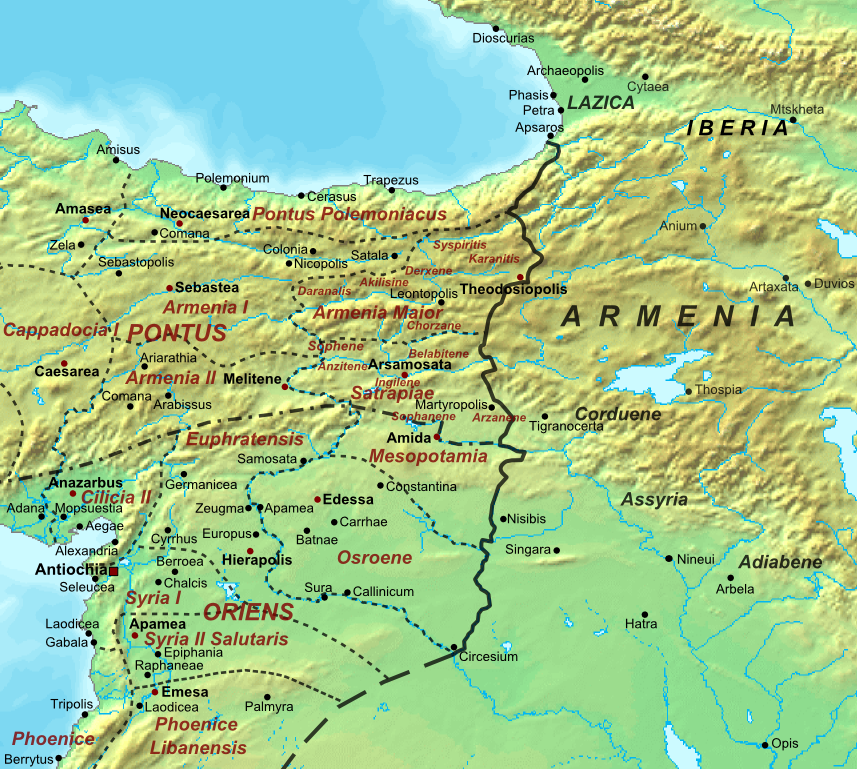
The division of Armenia after the Peace of Acilisene.

The Peace of Acilisene, sometimes known as the Partition of Armenia, was a treaty between the Eastern Roman Empire under Theodosius I and the Sasanian Empire under Shapur III, which was resolved in 384 and again in 387.

== Background ==
The Armenian monarchy encountered several difficulties in the years prior to the treaty. In 367, Arshak II killed himself while in a Sassanid prison, and his son, Pap of Armenia, was murdered by Traianus in 374. The Romans installed Varazdat after Pap's death, but he feuded with General Mushegh Mamikonian, and it was Manuel Mamikonian who ultimately claimed power. Manuel, who served as the regent for Pap's two sons, initially courted the Sassanids, but he eventually expelled a Sassanid satrap and army from Armenia. By this time, Armenia had already been de facto partitioned between Rome and Persia, and the internal dynasties had considered placing Pap's two sons on the thrones of the two partitions.

== Terms ==
The treaty, resolved in 384 and later in 387, divided the Kingdom of Armenia between the Eastern Roman Empire and the Sasanian Empire. The Sassanids received the larger share called Persarmenia, while the Romans retained Sophene and a smaller portion of Armenia (called Lesser Armenia). This also created a new boundary line between the two empires, running from Erzurum to Mush. Members of the Arsacid dynasty continued to rule both portions after the treaty.

Through this treaty, the Eastern Roman Empire admitted the loss of the Kingdom of Iberia to the Sasanians. During this period, Sassanian influence grew once again in eastern Georgia, and Zoroastrianism spread as far as Tbilisi, becoming "something like a second established religion of Iberia" until around mid-fifth century.

== Analysis ==
Writing in 1915, Percy Sykes, an aristocratic British officer, likened the outcome of the treaty to the Partitions of Poland of the late 18th century. In both cases, Sykes suggested that "turbulent" nobles sacrificed statehood for personal interests. To Sykes, the independent nationality of Armenia "passed away" as a result of the treaty. Kevork Aslan similarly acknowledged that the forces internal to Armenia helped catalyze the decision-making of the two external neighboring empires. Other debate has centered around the favorability of the terms from the perspective of Theodosius, an emperor who was also balancing struggles elsewhere in his empire at the time.

== See also ==
- Byzantine Armenia
- Perso-Roman wars of 337–361
- Roman Armenia
- Sasanian Armenia

== Sources ==
- Hebblewhite, Mark (2020). Theodosius and the Limits of Empire. Routledge. ISBN 9781032237657.
- Lang, David Marshall (1970). Armenia: Cradle of Civilization. George Allen & Unwin Ltd.
- Rayfield, Donald (2012). Edge of Empires: A History of Georgia. Reaktion Books. ISBN 9781780230702.
- Suny, Ronald Grigor (1994). The Making of the Georgian Nation. Indiana University Press. ISBN 978-0253209153.
- Sykes, Percy (1915). A History of Persia: Volume 1. Macmillan. OCLC 2477791.
- Aslan, Kevork (1920). Armenia and the Armenians from the Earliest Times Until the Great War (1914). Translated by Crabitès, Pierre. Macmillan. OCLC 408624.
- Melvill Gwatkin, Henry, ed. (1911). The Cambridge Medieval History. Vol. 1. Cambridge University Press. OCLC 609691577.
- Payaslian, Simon (2008). The History of Armenia: From the Origins to the Present. Palgrave Macmillan. ISBN 978-0230608580.
