= Vologases of Armenia =

King of Armenia from 378 to 386

King of Armenia
- Reign: 378–386
- Predecessor: Arshak III
- Successor: Khosrov IV
- Born: 372–374
- Died: 386
- House: Arsacid
- Father: Papas (Pap)
- Mother: Zarmandukht
- Religion: Armenian Apostolic

Vologases also known as Vologases III and Vagharsh III (flourished 4th century – died 386) was a Prince who served as a Roman Client King of Arsacid Armenia. Vologases served as a co-king with his brother Arsaces III from 378 until 386.

== Family and early life ==
Vologases was the second born son of the previous Roman Client Armenian King Papas (Pap) who reigned from 370 until 374 and his wife, the Armenian noblewoman called Zarmandukht and had an elder brother called Arsaces III (Arshak III). His known grandparents who were his paternal ones were the previous ruling Arsacid Monarchs Arsaces II (Arshak II) and his wife Pharantzem.

Vologases was named in honor of his Parthian and Armenian ancestors who ruled with this name as King. He was born at an unknown date in his father's reign and was raised in Armenia. Following the assassination of his father in 374, as Vologases and Arsaces III and his brother were too young to rule, the Roman emperor Valens had sent their paternal first cousin Varasdates (Varazdat) to occupy the Armenian throne. Their cousin who was a young man highly reputed for his mental and physical gifts had lived in Rome for an unknown period of time. Varasdates began to rule under the regency of the sparapet Mushegh I Mamikonian, whose family were pro-Roman.

== Rise to the throne ==
In 378 with the failed reign of Varasdates and the murder of Mushegh Mamikonian, the latter's brother, Manuel Mamikonian, filled the position of sparapet. Furious at the king, Manuel drove out Varasdates from Armenia back to Rome. Manuel raised Arsaces III and Vologases to the throne as co-kings of Armenia, under the nominal regency of their mother Zarmandukht.

To end the political anarchy in the country as Manuel being now the powerful regent-in-charge of Armenia, Manuel married Arsaces III to his daughter Vardandukht and he married Vologases to the daughter of Sahak from the Bagratuni dynasty. The Mamikonian government brought peace, stability to Armenia in which Manuel guided the country wisely. Manuel treated Arsaces III, Vologases and Zarmandukht with honor. He raised Arsaces III and Vologases and Manuel nurtured them as if they were his own children.

Vologases with his brother, aggressively pursued a policy on Christian Arianism. Vologases was the only King of Armenia to rule with this name, who wasn't at the same time, also serving as King of Parthia. Despite Armenia being the first Christian state, there were still traces of beliefs and customs in Zoroastrianism, sun worship and practices of consanguineous marriages in the country. An example of this was at Bagawan, where there was a fire temple set up and the destruction of statues placed there by Vologases. The zeal of the Sassanid high priest Kartir established and fostered fire temples, especially in Armenia which was attested by his inscriptions. As Vologases died in 386 without leaving an heir and Manuel Mamikonian died at the same time as him, Arsaces III became the sole-ruler of Armenia.

== Sources ==
- Faustus of Byzantium, History of the Armenians, 5th century
- N. Lenski, Failure of Empire: Valens and the Roman State in the Fourth Century A.D, University of California Press, 2003
- R.G. Hovannisian, The Armenian People From Ancient to Modern Times, Volume I: The Dynastic Periods: From Antiquity to the Fourteenth Century, Palgrave Macmillan, 2004
- A. Terian, Patriotism And Piety In Armenian Christianity: The Early Panegyrics On Saint Gregory, St Vladimir's Seminary Press, 2005
- A. Topchyan, The Problem of the Greek Sources of Movses Xorenac’i's History of Armenia, Peeters Publishers, 2006
- V.M. Kurkjian, A History of Armenia, Indo-European Publishing, 2008
- R.P. Adalian, Historical Dictionary of Armenia, Scarecrow Press, 2010
