= Vologases =

Vologases (Parthian: Walagash, Middle Persian: Wardākhsh/Walākshsh, Persian: بلاش, Balāsh), also known as Vologaeses, Vologaesus, Vologeses, Ologases, and Valarsh (Armenian), was the name of various ancient monarchs:

== Kings of Parthia ==
- Vologases I c. 51–78
- Vologases II c. 77–80
- Vologases III c. 105–147
- Vologases IV c. 147–191
- Vologases V c. 191–208
- Vologases VI c. 208–228

== Kings of Armenia ==
- Vologases I ruled 117/8–144
- Vologases II ruled 186–198
- Vologases III ruled 378-386 co-king with his brother Arsaces III

== Others ==
- Vologases (Bessi), chief of the Thracian Bessi, who led a revolt against the Romans in 13 BC
- Balash, a member of the Sassanid dynasty
- Vologases, King of Elymais, (c. 180- c. 190 AD)
- Vologash, King of Hatra
- Vologesh (died 361), bishop of Nisibis
