= Siege of Artogerassa =

Siege of Artogerassa (368)
- Part of Sasanian Empire invasions of Armenia
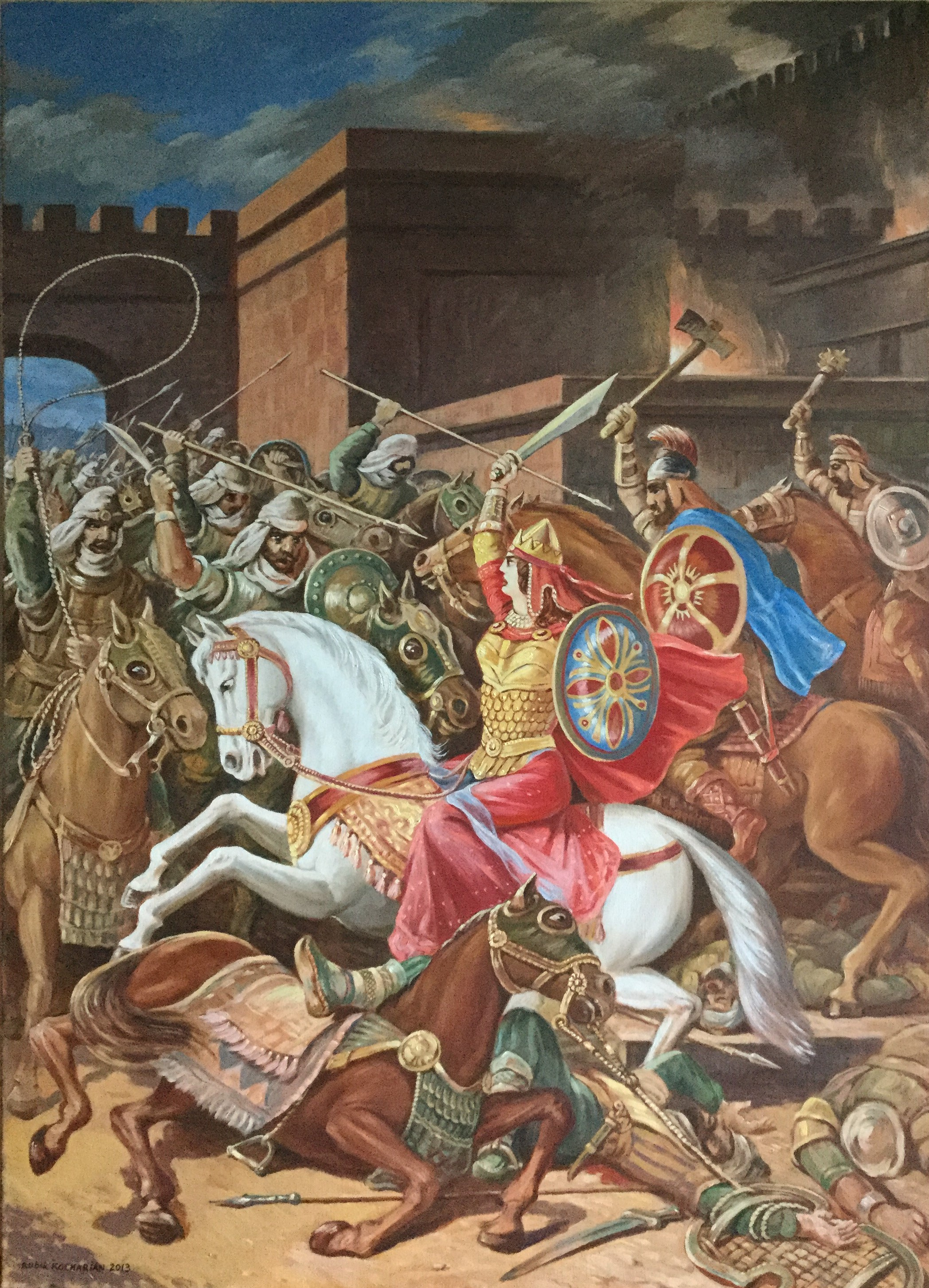
- Last Battle of Queen Pharandzem, by Rubik Kocharian, 2013
Date	Winter 367 – spring 368
Location	Ayrarat province, Arsharunik, Artogerassa, Arsacid Armenia
Result	Sasanian victory

Belligerents
Sassanian Empire	Arshakuni dynasty of Armenia

Commanders and leaders
Shapur II	Parandzem (POW)

Strength
Unknown	11,000

Casualties and losses
Light	Heavy

The siege of Artogerassa took place at Ayrarat province, Arsharunik in the castle of Artogerassa between Armenian queen Parandzem and Sasanian king Shapur II.

== Background ==
Shapur II, King of the Sasanian Empire, made an unexpected play for the Kingdom of Armenia during AD 368. He had tricked Arsaces, King of Armenia, to a banquet, captured him, and then had Arsaces murdered. Shapur committed the siege of this place to two renegade Armenians, Cylaces (Glak), a former governor of Armenia, and Artabanes (Artavan or Vahan), a former high-ranking military commander of that country, (who had both previously deserted to the Sassanids), while at the same time he proceeded to extend his influence beyond the limits of Armenia into the neighboring country of Iberia, which was closely connected with Armenia, and for the most part followed its fortunes. These two were charged with capturing Arsaces' wife and his son, Pap. Cylaces and Artabannes commenced the siege of Artogerassa, and for a time pressed it with vigor, while they strongly urged the garrison to make their submission. But, having entered within the walls to negotiate, they were won over by the opposite side, and joined in planning a treacherous attack on the besieging force, which was surprised at night and compelled to retire.

== Siege ==
By carefully calculated flattery mingled with perjury Shapur, tricked King Arsaces; for after being invited to a banquet he was taken according to orders to a secret rear-door; there after his eyes had been gouged out, he was bound in silver chains, which among that people is regarded as a consolation, though an empty one, for the punishment of men of rank, and then he was banished to a fortress called Agabana, where after being tortured he was slain by the penal steel. After sending Pap to safety in Roman Cappadocia, Parandzem manned the watchtowers every night at Artogerassa in the Caucasus Mountains on the Aras River and brandished torches to show her resolve. Meanwhile, the siege of Artogerassa continued, and the Epic Histories inform us that Pap, in "the land of the Greeks," was in communication with his mother inside the fortress, whom he encouraged to await his rescue, Unfortunately for Parandzem, Valens was willing to intervene and reimpose Pap only in 369. The clash ended in 368 in epidemic and hunger that wiped out most of Queen Parandzem's eleven thousand-man army and forced her surrender. After the siege Shapur ravages Armenia in retaliation of the ally with Rome, Shapur destroyed Artaxata, the Armenian capital, after that Shapur blockaded Artogerassa with the whole weight of his forces and after some battles of varying result and the exhaustion of the defenders, forced his way into the city and set it on fire, dragging out and carrying off the wife and the treasures of Arsaces. Shapur II wanting to humiliate Armenia and the Roman Empire, had Parandzem given to his soldiers whom they brutally raped until she died.
