= Arshak III =

King of Armenia
- Reign: 378–387
- Predecessor: Varazdat
- Successor: Khosrov IV
- Co-ruler: Vologases
- Born: 371
- Died: 390 (aged 18–19)
- Spouse: Vardandukht
- House: Arsacid
- Father: Papas (Pap)
- Mother: Zarmandukht

Arshak III, also known as Arsaces III or Arsak III (flourished 4th century) was an Arsacid prince who served as a Roman client king of Armenia from 378 until 387. Arshak III is often known as the last serving Roman client king of Armenia. During his reign, the part of Armenia that Arshak III governed was under Roman rule from the Peace of Acilisene.

== Family and early life ==
Arshak III was the first-born son of the previous Roman client Armenian King Pap, who reigned from 370 until 374, and his wife, the Armenian noblewoman called Zarmandukht. He had a younger brother called Vagharshak. His known grandparents, both from his paternal side, were the previous ruling Arsacid monarch Arshak II and his wife Parandzem.

Arshak III was the namesake of his paternal grandfather and several of his Arsacid ancestors. Arshak III was born at an unknown date during his father's reign and was raised in Armenia. Following the assassination of his father in 374, as Arshak III and his brother were too young to rule, the Roman emperor Valens sent their paternal first cousin Varazdat to occupy the Armenian throne. Their cousin had lived in Rome for an unknown period of time. Varazdat began his rule under the regency of Mushegh I Mamikonian, whose family was pro-Roman.

== Rise to the throne ==
In 378, after Varazdat had his regent Mushegh Mamikonian murdered, the brother of Mushegh, Manuel Mamikonian, raised a military force which drove Varazdat out of Armenia and back to Rome. Manuel then raised Arshak III and Vologases to the throne as co-kings of Armenia, under the nominal regency of their mother Zarmandukht.

To end the political anarchy in the country, as Manuel was now the powerful regent-in-charge of Armenia, he married Arsaces III to his daughter Vardandukht and Vologases to the daughter of Sahak from the Bagratuni dynasty. The Mamikonian government brought peace and stability to Armenia, as Manuel guided the country wisely. Manuel treated Arshak III, Vologases and Zarmandukht with honor. He brought up Arshak III and Vologases and nurtured them as if they were his own children.

Arshak III, like his predecessors, aggressively pursued policies based on Christian Arianism. In 386, Vologases died without leaving an heir and Arshak III became the sole ruler of Armenia. As Manuel Mamikonian died at the same time as Vagharshak did, the authority of Arshak III became lessened by the Sassanid invasions from Persia of Armenia. In 387, the last year of his kingship, Arshak III resided in Ekeghiats (Ekeleac’), in Western Armenia, as he then ruled only Western Armenia along a line from Erzurum to Mush. Around the year 390 Arshak died without leaving an heir. Western Armenia was annexed to and became a province of the Byzantine Empire. Eastern Armenia was annexed by the Sassanid Empire and the subsequent ruling Arsacid monarchs in Eastern Armenia became client kings of Armenia under Sassanid rule.

== In the Arts ==
- Arshak is a character in the tragedy Nerses The Great, Patron of Armenia written in 1857, by the Armenian playwright, actor & editor of the 19th century, Sargis Vanandetsi, also known as Sargis Mirzayan.

== Sources ==
- Faustus of Byzantium, History of the Armenians, 5th century
- D. M. Lang, Armenia: Cradle of Civilization – p.p. 163-165, Boston: George Allen & Unwin, 1970
- N. Lenski, Failure of Empire: Valens and the Roman State in the Fourth Century A.D., University of California Press, 2003
- R. G. Hovannisian, The Armenian People From Ancient to Modern Times, Volume I: The Dynastic Periods: From Antiquity to the Fourteenth Century, Palgrave Macmillan, 2004
- A. Terian, Patriotism And Piety In Armenian Christianity: The Early Panegyrics On Saint Gregory, St Vladimir's Seminary Press, 2005
- A. Topchyan, The Problem of the Greek Sources of Movses Xorenac’i's History of Armenia, Peeters Publishers, 2006
- V. M. Kurkjian, A History of Armenia, Indo-European Publishing, 2008
- R. P. Adalian, Historical Dictionary of Armenia, Scarecrow Press, 2010
