= Varazdat =

4th-century king of Armenia

King of Armenia
- Reign: 374/375–378
- Predecessor: Pap
- Successor: Arshak III; Vagharshak
- Dynasty: Arsacid
- Religion: Armenian Apostolic

Varazdat (Armenian: Վարազդատ; flourished 4th century) was the king of Arsacid Armenia from 374/375 until 378. He was installed on the throne by the Roman emperor Valens after the assassination of his kinsman King Pap.

== Name ==
The name Varazdat derives from Middle Persian warāz-dat, idc"given by the wild boar," the boar being one of the symbols of the Zoroastrian god of victory Verethragna.

== Family and early life ==
Varazdat's parentage is unclear. The classical Armenian historians Faustus of Byzantium and Movses Khorenatsi somewhat contemptuously refer to him as "a certain" member of the Arsacid house; Faustus also implies that Varazdat was not a true Arsacid but rather a bastard. Based on this information, Robert Bedrosian and Stepan Malkhasyants speculate that Varazdat was the illegitimate child of Pap. Faustus quotes Varazdat as declaring King Pap his paternal uncle, although a brother of Pap is never directly mentioned in the histories of Faustus and Khorenatsi. A later anonymous Armenian work, the Vita of St. Nerses, reports that Pap had a younger brother named Trdat, who therefore may have been the father of Varazdat. Faustus says nothing about the life of Varazdat before becoming king, but Khorenatsi gives a fanciful account of Varazdat winning in the Olympic games while in the Roman Empire. According to Khorenatsi, Varazdat was a talented archer, fencer, wrestler, pugilist and fighter of wild animals. Khorenatsi also describes Varazdat's martial exploits against the Lombards and Syrian brigands. Khorenatsi and Faustus both describe Varazdat as a brave and strong youth, but Faustus disparages him as "light-minded, with a child's capricious cunning."

There is no information about Varazdat having any children in the primary sources, but Cyril Toumanoff believed him to be the father of the later Arsacid kings Khosrov IV and Vramshapuh.

== Reign ==
Following the assassination of Pap by the Romans, Valens appointed Varazdat King of Armenia. At this time, a large Roman army was present in Armenia, and consequently the Armenian nobility had little choice but to accept Varazdat as king. Varazdat began his rule under the regency of Mushegh Mamikonian, the sparapet (general-in-chief) and leader of the pro-Roman party in Armenia. However, the young king soon clashed with Mushegh. In the view of historian Hakob Manandian, Varazdat sought to strengthen the Arsacid monarchy, which had been reduced to a subordinate role by the Romans and their allies the Mamikonians; for this reason he came into conflict with Mushegh. In Faustus's history, Varazdat's tutor (dayeak), Bat Saharuni, slanders Mushegh before Varazdat and incites him to assassinate the sparapet. Among the accusations levied against Mushegh were that he was complicit in the murder of Varazdat's predecessor Pap and that he was conspiring with the Romans to turn Armenia into a Roman province and dethrone the Arsacids. According to Manandian and Josef Markwart, these accusations were not baseless, and Mushegh's policies were indeed reducing the power of the monarchy and would have likely ended in Armenia's total annexation by Rome.

In early 377, the Roman units in Armenia were withdrawn and sent west to fight the Goths. It was probably after this that Varazdat had Mushegh assassinated at a banquet. Varazdat then appointed his tutor Bat Saharuni as sparapet, depriving the Mamikonians of their hereditary office. After this, Mushegh's kinsman Manuel Mamikonian escaped from captivity in Persia and marched against Varazdat to avenge his relative and reclaim the office of sparapet. According to Faustus, the forces of Varazdat and Manuel met on the field of Karin and the two engaged in single combat, with Manuel emerging victorious but sparing the young king's life. Varazdat then fled to the Roman Empire. Manuel made the two young sons of Pap, Arshak and Vagharshak, co-rulers of Armenia under the formal regency of their mother Zarmandukht.

Movses Khorenatsi gives a different, less likely version of Varazdat's reign, in which Varazdat conspires with the Persians, for which he is called before the Roman emperor (whom Khorenatsi erroneously calls Theodosius) and exiled to the island of Thule.

== See also ==
- List of Armenian Olympic medalists

== Bibliography ==
- Bedrosian, Robert (1983). "The Sparapetut'iwn in Armenia in the Fourth and Fifth Centuries" (PDF). Armenian Review. 36 (2): 6–46.
- Garsoïan, Nina (1997). "The Aršakuni Dynasty". In Hovannisian, Richard G. (ed.). The Armenian People from Ancient to Modern Times. Vol. 1. New York: St. Martin's Press. ISBN 0-312-10169-4.
- Garsoïan, Nina G. (1989). The Epic Histories Attributed to Pʻawstos Buzand (Buzandaran Patmutʻiwnkʻ). Cambridge, Massachusetts: Harvard University Press. ISBN 0-674-25865-7.
- Katvalyan, M. (1985). "Varazdat". In Hambardzumyan, Viktor (ed.). Soviet Armenian Encyclopedia (in Armenian). Vol. 11. Erevan. pp. 305–306.
- Lenski, Noel (2002). Failure of Empire: Valens and the Roman State in the Fourth Century A.D. University of California Press. ISBN 978-0-520-28389-3.
- Malkhasyantsʻ, Stepʻan (1968). Pʻavstos Buzand, Patmutʻyun Hayotsʻ (in Armenian). Erevan: "Hayastan" hratarakchʻutʻyun.
- Manandyan, Hakob (1957). Kʻnnakan tesutʻyun hay zhoghovrdi patmutʻyan, hator B, masn A [Critical theory of the history of the Armenian people, volume II, part I] (in Armenian). Erevan: Haypethrat.
- P'awstos Buzand (1985). History of the Armenians. Translated by Bedrosian, Robert. New York.
- Toumanoff, Cyril (1963). Studies in Christian Caucasian History. Georgetown University Press. OCLC 505712128.
