= Pap of Armenia =

King of Armenia from 370 to 374

Pap

King of Armenia
- Reign: 370–374/375
- Predecessor: Arshak II
- Successor: Varazdat
- Born: c. 353
- Died: 374/375
- Spouse: Zarmandukht
- Issue: Arshak III; Vagharshak
- Dynasty: Arsacid
- Father: Arshak II
- Mother: Parandzem
- Religion: Arianism

Pap (c. 353 – 374/375) was king of Armenia from 370 until 374/375, and a member of the Arsacid dynasty. His reign saw a short, but notable period of stabilization after years of political turmoil. Although Armenia had been conquered and devastated by the Sassanid king Shapur II in 367/368, Pap was restored to the throne at a young age with Roman assistance in 370. Early in his reign, Armenia and Rome won a joint victory over the Persians at the Battle of Bagavan, and some former territories of the kingdom were reconquered by the efforts of his sparapet (general-in-chief) Mushegh Mamikonian. Although Pap's reign began with a reconciliation of the monarchy, nobility and church, his relations with the church soon deteriorated. Pap allegedly had the Patriarch of Armenia, Nerses I, poisoned, although some later historians doubt this narrative. Pap also eventually ran afoul of the Romans, who suspected him of colluding with the Persians. The emperor Valens unsuccessfully attempted to assassinate him in 373/374, but ultimately succeeded in having him killed in 374/375. He was succeeded by his nephew Varazdat as king.

Pap is depicted with hostility by the classical Armenian historians, likely due to the king's troublesome relationship with the Armenian Church. The Roman historian Ammianus Marcellinus, however, praised Pap for his bravery and cleverness. Some later Armenian historians have reevaluated Pap positively, valuing his attempts to strengthen the Armenian monarchy and pursue an independent foreign policy under difficult circumstances.

== Family ==
Pap was the son of the Arsacid king of Armenia Arshak (Arsaces) II (r. 350–368) and his wife Parandzem. The exact year of Pap's birth is not known for certain and has been debated by historians; one source gives it as approximately 353. (Note: Hakob Manandian writes that the issue of Pap's date of birth is still debated, and does not give a conclusive answer himself. Malachia Ormanian suggested that Pap was born in 351 and was actually the son of Arshak's other wife, Olympias, which is rejected by Manandian. Manandian categorically rejects Josef Markwart's suggestion that Pap was born in 360, which would have made him ten years old at the time of his coronation and fourteen at the time of his murder. Gagik Sargsyan gives Pap's birth year as approximately 353. Nina Garsoïan writes that only a date around 350 would make sense considering the other evidence about Pap's life.) Armenian historian Hakob Manandian considered it possible that Pap was actually the son of Parandzem by her first husband Gnel (Arshak's nephew). Historian Albert Stepanyan argues that Pap was in fact Arshak's son, but that he was initially legally regarded as Gnel's son, as Arshak had married Paradzem in an Iranian-style levirate marriage called stūr ī būtak or čakarīh, whereby a childless widow would marry one of her late husband's agnatic relatives to provide her deceased husband with an heir. Additionally, Arshak had apparently married Parandzem while still married to his first wife Olympias, despite the recent banning of polygamy at the church council of Ashtishat. For these reasons, Arshak faced serious obstacles in legitimizing Pap as his legal son and heir. According to Stepanyan, it was only after the death of Queen Olympias (purportedly by poisoning on Parandzem's orders) that Parandzem was made a full royal consort and her son Pap was recognized as crown prince of Armenia. Historian Nina Garsoïan, on the other hand, contends that Pap must have been Arshak's legitimate son and heir, as even the sources extremely hostile to him never question his legitimacy. She proposes another hypothesis according to which Pap was born to Parandzem by Arshak around 350, after which Parandzem was passed to Gnel in a temporary marriage and later taken back by Arshak, thus explaining how Pap could have been born prior to Gnel's death circa 359.

Pap also appears to have had a brother or half-brother whose son Varazdat succeeded Pap as king. This brother is not mentioned by name in the histories of Faustus of Byzantium or Movses Khorenatsi, two of the main Armenian sources on Pap's life, but another Armenian work, the anonymous Vita of St. Nerses, reports that Pap had a younger brother named Trdat.

Pap's name is of Middle Iranian origin and literally means "father". The manuscripts of Ammianus Marcellinus's history give his name as Para, which historians read as Papa.

== Ascendance to the throne ==
Around 367/368, Pap's father Arshak II went to Persia for peace negotiations with the Sassanid king Shapur II and was imprisoned, leaving the Armenian throne vacant. (Note: Arshak is said by Faustus to have committed suicide in captivity a few years later, while Ammianus writes that he was captured, blinded, and executed by the Persians.) Queen Parandzem and Prince Pap took refuge with the royal treasure in the fortress of Artogerassa (Artagers), defended by a troop of azats (lesser Armenian nobles). (Note: Faustus writes instead that Pap was already a hostage in the Roman Empire at the time of the Siege of Artogerassa.) According to Ammianus Marcellinus, the Persian invasion force was commanded by two Armenian defectors, Cylaces (Glak) and Artabanes (Artavan or Vahan). Faustus also mentions two Armenian nakharars (magnates), Meruzhan Artsruni and Vahan Mamikonian (possibly identifiable with Ammianus's Artabanes), in leadership positions under Shapur II's suzerainty, as well as Zik and Karen who carried Persian noble titles. (Note: Zik and Karen were the names of two of the Seven Great Houses of Iran. Faustus uses these as the proper names of two individuals.) Shapur II may have intended to combine Sassanid administrative rule (Zik and Karen) with that of nakharar rule (Artsruni and Mamikonian).

During the siege, Arshak II's wife Parandzem appealed to Cylaces and Artabanes in the name of her husband. The two men defected back to the Arsacid monarchy and engineered the escape of Pap. Themistius reported Pap's arrival at Valens' court in Marcianopolis, where the emperor was wintering. According to Faustus, Pap was in contact with his mother while in Roman territory and encouraged her to await his return. Valens sent him to stay at Neocaesarea in Pontus Polemoniacus, 300 kilometres (190 mi) from the Armenian border, where Pap received "liberal support and education." In 369, at the request of sparapet Mushegh Mamikonian (according to Faustus) or of Cylaces and Artabanes (according to Ammianus), Valens allowed Pap to return to Armenian territory. (Note: In one work, Garsoïan places Pap's return earlier, c. 367; in another work, she gives the date as c. 368/70.) He was accompanied by the comes et dux Terentius but was not yet recognized as King of Armenia by the Romans.

== King of Armenia ==
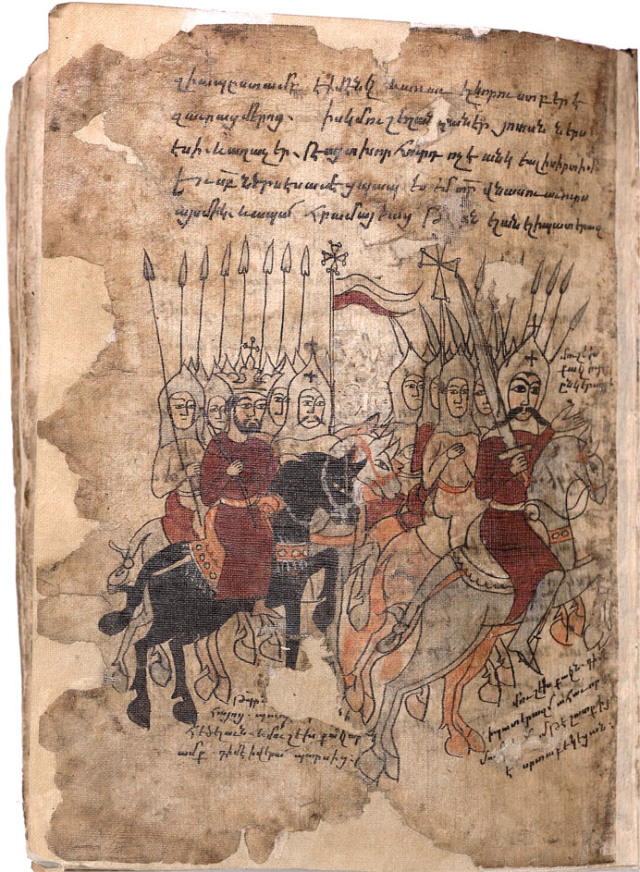
A 16th-century miniature depicting King Pap (left) and sparapet Mushegh Mamikonian

Valens was reluctant to bestow a royal title upon Pap as this would violate an earlier treaty signed by Jovian in July 363, whereby Rome had pledged not to intervene in Armenian affairs. Nevertheless, Shapur was enraged at Pap's restoration and personally invaded Armenia in response, forcing Pap to leave Armenia again and go into hiding near the Roman frontier in Lazica. Instead of going after Pap, Shapur II concentrated his attack on Artogerassa, which fell in the winter of 369/70. The royal treasure was captured by the Persians and Parandzem was raped and murdered. Shapur II also began systematically persecuting the local Christians, destroying churches, erecting fire temples and forcing conversion to Zoroastrianism.

Shapur II contacted Pap while he was in hiding and tried to persuade him to come over to his side. Under Shapur II's influence, Pap murdered the duplicitous Cylaces and Artabanes and sent their heads to the shahanshah as a sign of loyalty. Shapur's attempted rapprochement with Pap was aborted, however, by Arinthaeus's return to Armenia with a Roman army that restored Pap to the throne for a second time in approximately spring 370. (Note: Jan Willem Drijvers writes that Shapur's correspondence with Pap likely occurred only after he was restored to the throne.) In the spring of 371, Shapur II launched another massive invasion of Armenia. In response, Valens sent a force headed by his generals Traianus and Vadomarius into Armenia. The Armenian army also assembled under the command of sparapet Mushegh Mamikonian. The joint Roman-Armenian force met the invading Persian army in the region of Bagrevand and emerged victorious at the Battle of Bagavan. (Note: Khorenatsi instead places the battle in a "field called Dziraw" (Book 3, Chapter 37), and so the battle is referred to in some Armenian sources as the Battle of Dziraw. Manandian and others consider this to be a misidentification.) Faustus of Byzantium gives considerable credit for the victory to Mushegh Mamikonian and writes that Pap observed the battle from the nearby height of Mount Npat. During the ensuing battles, more Armenian territories were reclaimed from the Persians (according to Faustus), including Arzanene and Corduene, which had been ceded to the Persians by Jovian in 363. (Note: The extent of the reconquest of Armenian territories by Mushegh is uncertain and likely exaggerated by Faustus. Faustus names the following territories among those recaptured by Mushegh: part of Atrpatakan, Noshirakan, Kordukʻ (Corduene), Kordikʻ, Tmorikʻ, "the land of the Markʻ (Medes)", Artsʻakh, Utikʻ, Shakashēn, Gardmanadzor, Koghtʻ, Kasp (Pʻaytakaran), Gugarkʻ, Aghdznikʻ (Arzanene), Mets Tsopʻkʻ (Greater Sophene), Angeghtun, and Andzitʻ. Manandian rules out the reconquest of Arzanene and Corduene (which had been ceded to Persia by Rome in 363), as well as the capture of Greater Sophene, Angeghtun (Ingilene) and Andzitʻ (Anzitene), which had been annexed by Rome. Chaumont considers the reconquest of territories from Albania (Artsʻakh, Utikʻ, Shakashēn, Gardman, Koghtʻ) to be unlikely.) By the end of the summer, Shapur II had retreated to his capital at Ctesiphon and Valens had returned to Antioch. Shapur II was unable to confront the massive Roman buildup in Armenia as a result of his preoccupation with Kushan attacks in the eastern part of his empire. Thus, Roman control over Armenia through the client king Pap was secure for the time being.

Pap was a young man—likely still a teenager—when he took the throne. At the beginning of his reign, he invited Patriarch Nerses I to return to Armenia. Nerses agreed and undertook the restoration of Armenia's churches and church institutions, caring for the poor and reestablishing the church's influence in the country. Meanwhile, sparapet Mushegh campaigned to restore Arsacid authority in Armenia, brutally punishing the provinces that had revolted against the monarchy, forcing the pro-Persian nakharars to submit to royal authority, and retaking territories from neighboring Albania and Iberia. Soon after these initial successes, Pap came into conflict with Patriarch Nerses. According to Faustus, Nerses constantly reprimanded Pap for his sinful behavior and refused to allow him to enter the church; Movses Khorenatsi implies that Pap was upset at Nerses for having him return lands that had been confiscated from the nobility during his father's reign. Some modern historians believe that Pap clashed with the church due to his support for Valens's pro-Arian religious policy; others believe that Pap was a Christian in name only and that he was sympathetic towards Zoroastrianism. Still others regard Pap's conflict with the clergy as the result of his steps to restrain the excessive power of the church, which had accumulated significant estates and wealth in the form of the charitable institutions created by Nerses during Arshak II's reign.

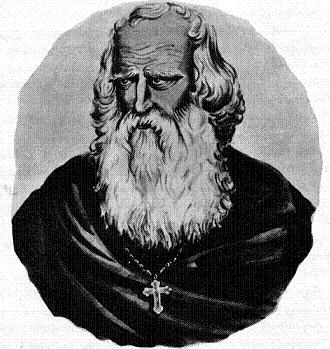
Illustration of Patriarch Nerses I

The conflict between the king and the patriarch came to a head in 373, (Note: Leo gives 372 as the date of Nerses's death, while Lenski estimates that Nerses's murder occurred in late 371.) when, according to Faustus and Movses, Pap invited Nerses to dinner at his mansion in the village of Khakh and had him poisoned. The king then dissolved the charitable institutions established by Nerses, abolished the ptghi and tasanord tithes paid to the church, and seized much of the church's lands. He also limited the clergy's exemption from military service, ordering that the sons and brothers of the lower clergy be placed at the disposal of the court. Pap nominated a man named Yusik as a replacement and sent him for consecration in Caesarea, but the Bishop of Caesarea Basil refused to consecrate the nominee. Valens requested that Basil quickly resolve the situation by finding a new nominee acceptable to Pap. Basil failed to do so and the Roman see of Caesarea effectively lost its traditional role of consecrating the Patriarch of Armenia. According to Faustus, the poisoning of the popular and powerful patriarch caused a rift between the king and the nobility and alienated sparapet Mushegh in particular. Nerses had also been a close Roman contact; his murder and the subsequent loss of Roman ecclesiastical control over the appointment of the Patriarch of Armenia must have damaged Pap's relations with Valens.

Some later historians have cast doubt on or totally rejected the assertion that Pap had Nerses poisoned. The Armenian historian Leo considered it a legend that was presented as fact by later ecclesiastical historians seeking to defame Pap. Authors Malachia Ormanian and Yeghiazar Muradian, judging from the circumstances described by Faustus, thought it more likely that Nerses died of some illness of the lungs or heart, perhaps on the same day or the day after he had dinner with Pap, giving rise to the rumor that the patriarch had been poisoned. Josef Markwart and Hakob Manandian also reject the story of Nerses's poisoning, arguing that Pap would have surely been called to account for it by Basil of Caesarea. Nina Garsoïan and Noel Lenski, on the other hand, do not dispute that Pap poisoned Nerses and note that he was not the first Arsacid king to have a patriach murdered, in reference to Pap's grandfather Tiran who had Patriarch Yusik assassinated. Ammianus Marcellinus is notably silent on Nerses's murder. This may reflect the Roman historian's general disinterest in religious matters, although it has been suggested that Ammianus deliberately omitted this episode in order not to diminish his narrative of Pap as "the innocent victim of Roman villainy."

== Fall ==
In addition to the controversy over the appointment of a new patriarch, Pap's relations with Valens further suffered due to the Roman commander Terentius, who wrote to the emperor criticizing Pap and advising him to depose the Armenian king in order to prevent him from defecting to Persia. According to Faustus, Pap also demanded control over Caesarea and twelve other Roman cities including Edessa as former Arsacid domains while openly courting Persia, in defiance of the warnings of sparapet Mushegh and other nobles not to break the alliance with Rome. Ammianus, on the contrary, claims that Pap was completely loyal to Rome. Valens decided to have Pap executed, and invited him to a meeting in Tarsus in 373 or 374. Pap arrived with 300 mounted escorts, but quickly became worried by the absence of the emperor, who was still in Antioch, and therefore fled back toward Armenia and fought off a legion that was sent after him.

Terentius sent two generals with scutarii (shielded cavalry) familiar with the local terrain after Pap, an Armenian named Danielus and an Iberian named Barzimeres, who failed to capture Pap. The generals gave the excuse that Pap had used magical powers to avoid capture and used a dark cloud to mask his party, which is reminiscent of Faustus's claim that Pap was possessed by demons. This could have simply been an attack on Pap's character based on his sympathies towards Arians and pagans. Ammianus writes that Pap's subjects joyfully greeted their king's return, and that even after this assassination attempt Pap did not turn against the Roman Empire. Valens then ordered Traianus, Terentius's successor as comes et dux of Armenia, to gain Pap's confidence and murder him. A barbarian guard murdered Pap in 374 or 375 during a banquet which Traianus had organized for the young king. Ammianus describes the murder of Pap on Valens's orders as an unjustified and treacherous act, drawing parallels with the murder of the Quadi King Gabinius by Valentinian I and claiming that the ghost of Pap haunted many. According to Garsoïan, the murder of Pap may not have occurred at the Emperor's own initiative but rather as a result of a conspiracy by Terentius, Traianus, and other Orthodox officers in the East who were opposed to Valens's and Pap's pro-Arian religious policy.

The Armenian nakharars still loyal to Pap did little to protest the murder of the king because of the large Roman army present in Armenian territory. The new Roman nominee for king, Pap's nephew Varazdat (Varasdates), was accepted by virtually everyone. Varazdat had grown up in Rome and began to rule under the regency of Mushegh Mamikonian, as the Mamikonians were the chief pro-Roman noble house in Armenia. Shapur II had long been courting Pap and the latter's murder and replacement with a Roman nominee provoked Persian outrage; however, Shapur did not invade and took only diplomatic action.

== Marriage and issue ==
Pap married an Armenian noblewoman called Zarmandukht, who bore him two sons: Arshak (Arsaces) III and Vagharshak (Vologases). Pap's sons were later made co-rulers of Armenia by sparapet Manuel Mamikonian after he forced Pap's successor Varazdat to flee the country. Additionally, some scholars believe Varazdat to have been the illegitimate child of Pap.

== Historiography ==
The classical Armenian historians are hostile to Pap and ascribe to him an array of sins, chief among which being the murder of Nerses I. Faustus of Byzantium, drawing from epical sources, depicts Pap as totally evil and possessed by demons (dewkʻ) from birth, which caused him to commit sins such as sodomy and bestiality. This attitude toward Pap has been explained by the king's troublesome relationship with the Armenian Church, caused by his promotion of Arianism and efforts to limit the church's power and influence. The Roman historian Ammianus Marcellinus, who, unlike the classical Armenian historians, was a contemporary of Pap, presents a more favorable image of the young king, whom he praises for his bravery and cleverness and describes as being welcomed "with the greatest joy by his subjects" after escaping the first assassination attempt against him. Later Armenian historians reevaluated Pap in a positive light, considering him an unjust victim of pro-church historians and valuing his attempts to strengthen the Armenian monarchy and pursue an independent foreign policy under difficult circumstances. Several of the "evil deeds" ascribed to Pap by Faustus were reinterpreted as the king's efforts to stabilize and repopulate the war-torn Kingdom of Armenia. Some other modern historians have evaluated Pap less positively. In Noel Lenski's view, Pap likely struggled to rule a kingdom that was still recovering from the destruction wrought by Shapur II, leading him to make poor decisions that ultimately led to his downfall.

== Cultural depictions ==
- Pap is a character in the tragedy Nerses the Great, Patron of Armenia written in 1857, by the 19th-century Armenian playwright, actor and editor, Sargis Vanandetsi (Sargis Mirzayan).
- Pap is the titular character of the historical novel Pap Tagavor by Stepan Zoryan, first published in 1944.
