= Manuel Mamikonian =

4th-century Armenian military commander

Manuel Mamikonian (Old Armenian: Մանուէլ Մամիկոնեան, romanized: Manuēl Mamikonean; d. 385/386) was a 4th-century Armenian military commander and nobleman of the Mamikonian dynasty. He became the de facto leader of Armenia after driving the Arsacid king Varazdat (r. 374–378) out of the country and placing two young Arsacid princes, Arshak and Vagharshak, on the throne. He held the title of sparapet (commander-in-chief), which was the hereditary right of the Mamikonian family.

Manuel was the son of Artashes Mamikonian. Manuel and his brother Koms (or Kon) were taken captive by the Sasanians and sent to fight against the Kushans. In 377/8, King Varazdat ordered the assassination of Manuel's kinsman sparapet Mushegh I Mamikonian and granted the office of sparapet to his tutor Bat Saharuni. After this, Manuel went to Armenia with Persian permission to take the office of sparapet. Manuel and Varazdat's armies met in the field of Karin, where Manuel emerged victorious but allowed the Varazdat to flee the country. Manuel then crowned as co-rulers the two young sons of the former king Pap of Armenia, Arshak and Vagharshak. Manuel served as regent together with the queen mother Zarmandukht. He also married his daughter Vardandukht to Arshak.

According to the Armenian history attributed to Faustus of Byzantium, Manuel was convinced that the Persian ruler was plotting against him and so attacked the Persian emissary Suren and his 10,000 troops. Manuel decimated Suren's army but allowed Suren to escape. This led to an invasion of Armenia by the Persian forces. Armies under generals such as Varaz were sent to invade Armenia but were defeated by Manuel. According to Faustus, this led to seven years of peace for Armenia. The modern Armenian historian Hakob Manandian, on the other hand, believes that Manuel accepted Sasanian suzerainty over Armenia. Manuel died in 385 or 386.

== Sources ==
- Faustus of Byzantium, History of the Armenians, 5th century
- History of Urartu and Armenia, in Encyclopædia Britannica, 15th Edition, Vo. 18, p. 1042
- Melik-Bakhshyan, Stepan (1981). "MANVEL MAMIKONYAN". In Hambardzumyan, Viktor (ed.). Soviet Armenian Encyclopedia (in Armenian). Vol. 7. Yerevan. p. 241.
