= Cylaces =

Cylaces or Glak (Old Armenian: Գղակ, romanized: Głak, misspelled Դղակ, Dłak in the manuscripts of Faustus of Byzantium's history) was a 4th-century Armenian eunuch who occupied the office of hayr-mardpet (grand chamberlain). He initially defected to the Sasanian side during Shapur II's invasion of Armenia, but later rejoined the Armenians in 368 and fought Shapur II's forces. In 370, he sent messengers to Shapur II, promising him to betray the Armenian king Pap (r. 370–374). However, this ploy was discovered by Pap, who had Cylaces assassinated.

In Faustus of Byzantium's History of Armenia, Cylaces is split into two characters, both of whom are executed on Pap's orders: an unnamed hayr-mardpet who is executed for insulting Pap's mother Parandzem, and another one named Glak who is executed for conspiring with the Persians.

== Sources ==
- Lenski, Noel Emmanuel (2002). Failure of Empire: Valens and the Roman state in the fourth century A.D. University of California Press. ISBN 978-0-520-23332-4.
- Syvanne, Ilkka (2015). Military History of Late Rome 284–361. Pen & Sword.
