= Terentius (dux) =

Terentius was an Eastern Roman military commander whose recorded career flourished in the Caucasus region c. 369–374. He served the Roman Emperor Valens as comes rei militaris (military commander), most notably in the East.

Terentius first appears as dux in undated tiles from Aquincum and Brigetio. He is next mentioned as comes and dux, being in command of the expedition that reinstated Pap as king of Armenia in 370. That same year, with twelve legions Terentius helped Sauromaces to reclaim the throne of Iberia from Aspacures, Sauromaces' cousin and a Sasanian client. In 373 or 374 Terentius urged the emperor Valens to replace Pap with a more amenable person in order to prevent Armenia from falling into Sasanian hands and, subsequently, lost Pap's confidence. In 375, Terentius appears retired and residing at Antioch. It is not clear whether Terentius is the same commander mentioned in 373 as attacking the Albanians and Iberians.

Terentius was a devoted Christian. When asked by Valens what reward he would choose for his services, Terentius requested—to the emperor's ire—that a church be given for the use of the orthodox Christians. His daughters were nuns at Samosata.
