= Stepan Zoryan =

Armenian writer (1890–1967)

Stepan Zoryan Ստեփան Զորյան
- Born: Stepan Yeghiayi Arakelyan; September 16, 1890; Karakilisa, Erivan Governorate, Russian Empire
- Died: October 14, 1967 (aged 77); Yerevan, Armenian SSR, Soviet Union
- Occupation: Writer
- Writing career
- Language: Armenian

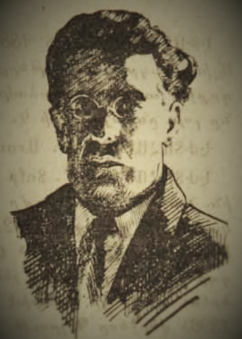

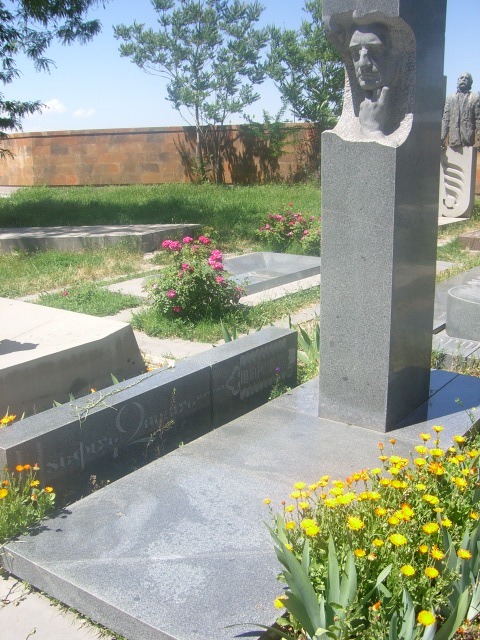
Tomb of Stepan Zoryan in Yerevan

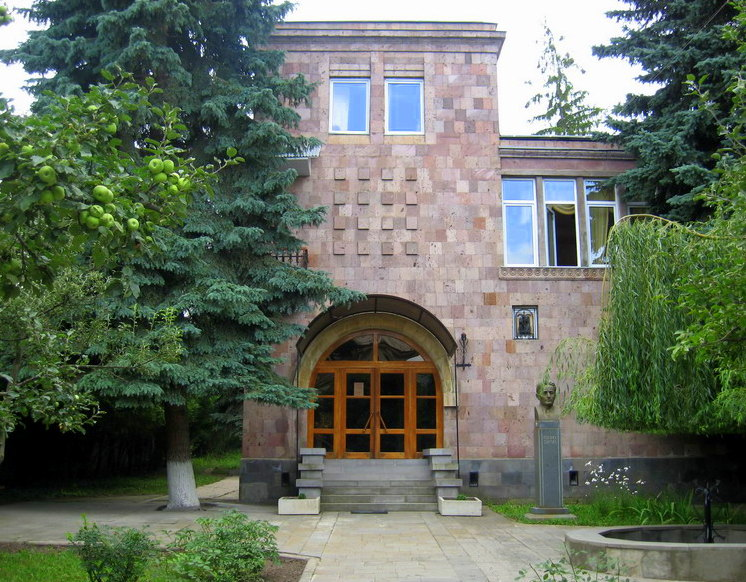
Stepan Zoryan state museum in Vanadzor

Stepan Yeghiayi Zoryan (Armenian: Ստեփան Եղիայի Զորյան, born Stepan Yeghiayi Arakelyan; September 16, 1890 – October 14, 1967) was a Soviet Armenian writer.

== Biography ==
Stepan Zoryan (real surname Arakelyan) was born in 1890 to a peasant family in the small town of Karakilisa (modern-day Vanadzor) in the Erivan Governorate of the Russian Empire. As a child he first studied in a small private school before enrolling in the local Russian school, from which he graduated in 1904.

In 1906, he left for Tiflis, hoping to enter the Nersisian Armenian school. However, his difficult financial situation forced him to work as a proofreader at a printing house, and then as a translator for the Armenian newspaper Surhandak ("Messenger"). From 1912 to 1919, he worked as a translator and stylist for the newspaper Mshak ("Laborer"). In 1919, he moved to Yerevan, where he worked for the monthly Hayastani kooperatsia ("Cooperation of Armenia"). From 1922 to 1925, he was the editor-in-chief and secretary of the collegium of the publishing house of the People's Commissariat for Education of the Armenian SSR. From 1927 to 1928 he was the deputy chairman of the Writers' Union of Armenia. From 1930 to 1934 he worked as a literary consultant for the state film studio Haykino. From 1950 to 1954 he was secretary of the Writers' Union of Armenia. He was a member of the artistic council of the Hayastan state publishing house, the scientific councils of Matenadaran and the Manuk Abeghyan Institute of Literature, and the chief editorial board of the Armenian Soviet Encyclopedia. He participated in the production of critical editions of the works of Khachatur Abovyan, Raphael Patkanyan, and Hovhannes Tumanyan.

Zoryan also held some state positions. From 1929 to 1935, he was a member of the Central Executive Committee of the USSR. In 1962 he was elected a deputy of the Supreme Council of the Armenian SSR.

Stepan Zoryan died on October 14, 1967, in Yerevan. He is buried in the Komitas Pantheon.

Zoryan's works are dedicated to the life of the Armenian village, its social problems and Sovietization. After the October Revolution he published a number of novel collections (War, 1925; Tsovan, 1925; The library girl, 1926; Fire, 1927, etc.). One of his most notable works is the historical novel Pap tagavor ("King Pap"), which has been published many times and is included in the school curriculum in Armenia. Zoryan's compositions have been translated into 22 languages.

== Zoryan Museum ==
The Stepan Zoryan state museum was opened in 1972 in Kirovakan (current Vanadzor), at the writer's own house, called by the local inhabitants an "Armenian fortress". It was partially destroyed during the 1988 Spitak earthquake and reopened in 1990.

== Filmography ==
- Stepan Zoryan, 10 min, 1969, black and white documentary film, director S. Arakelian.
