= Kevork Aslan =

Armenian historian

Kevork Aslan was an Armenian engineer born in 1849 who graduated from École Centrale de Paris in 1872 and later became chief engineer in the Aydin province (Turkey). In 1909, he published a historical study of the Armenian people.

== Books ==
- Aslan (1909). Études historiques sur le peuple arménien. Paris. ISBN 2014504164.
- Armenia and the Armenians from the Earliest Times Until the Great War - (1409782565) (1914)
