= The Armenian Review =

Academic journal that has been published in Watertown, Massachusetts since 1948

- Language: English

Publication details
- History: 1948–present

Standard abbreviations
- ISO 4: Armen. Rev.

Links
- Journal homepage

The Armenian Review is an academic journal that has been published in Watertown, Massachusetts, since 1948. It publishes articles on topics related to Armenia and Armenians, and articles dealing with other themes and countries that use a comparative approach or help to comprehend the Armenian experience.

At times Armenian Review was published on a quarterly basis, but it has been irregular and sporadic during most of the 1990s and early 2000s (decade). Since 2008 the Armenian Review has published 4 issues. It is currently published twice a year in May and in November.
