= Sparapet =

Hereditary supreme military commander in ancient and medieval Armenia

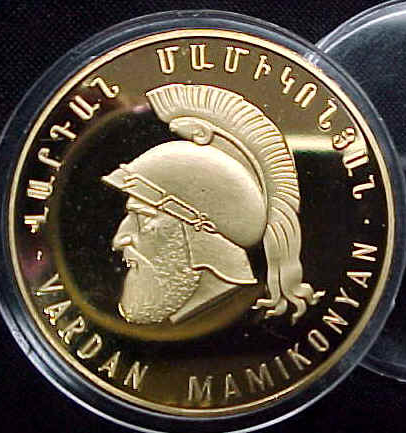
Armenian medallion depicting Vardan Mamikonian, Armenian sparapet of the 5th century

Sparapet (Old Armenian: սպարապետ) was a military title and office in ancient and medieval Armenia. Under the Arsacid dynasty of Armenia, the sparapet was the supreme commander of the kingdom's armed forces. During the Arsacid period and for some time afterwards, the office was held hereditarily by the senior member of the House of Mamikonian. Later in history, the title was held by members of other noble houses, such as the Bagratuni and Pahlavuni dynasties. The title was used in the medieval Armenian Kingdom of Cilicia, where the bearer of the title was also called gundstabl (գունդստաբլ), from the Byzantine and Western title of constable.

== Etymology ==
The word sparapet is of Iranian origin, ultimately deriving from Proto-Iranian *spādapati- (“commander of the army”), which is composed of *cwáHdaH (“army”) and *pati- (“lord”). The word was borrowed into Armenian several times from different Iranian languages, yielding the alternative forms asparapet, aspayapet, and spayapet; the most common form, sparapet, was borrowed from Parthian. It is cognates with Middle Persian spahbed (whence modern Persian: سپهبد, romanized: sepahbod) and Georgian spaspet.

Sparapet has been translated into English as "grand marshal," "commander-in-chief," and "high constable."

== History ==
The exact period in which the office of sparapet emerged in Armenia is not known for certain. Historian Suren Yeremian believed it to have been instituted in the 2nd century BCE during the reign of Artaxias I, although according to another historian, it was established under the Arsacids, along with the other major hereditary state offices of Armenia.

In Arsacid Armenia, the sparapet was at all times in control of the royal cavalry units called the ayrudzi, and during times of war was the supreme commander of all military units of the Kingdom of Armenia. It is not clear to what extent the functions of the office coincided with those of the Sasanian spahbed. The title of sparapet came with considerable prestige and power, which gave its hereditary holders, the Mamikonians, a degree of influence rivalling that of the ruling Arsacids. Historian Nicholas Adontz writes:

The Mamikonean as sparapets, were said to stand above all the zoravark' or military commanders. The Armenian army was made up of many contingents furnished by the princely houses. Each of these detachments was commanded by its own prince, but the supreme command belonged to the hereditary sparapets, the Mamikonean house, who, in this sense stood 'above all the princes and their armies'.

In the late 4th century, the Arsacid king Varazdat ordered the murder of sparapet Mushegh Mamikonian and appointed a non-Mamikonian, Bat Saharuni, to the office. This was short-lived, however, as Mushegh's kinsman Manuel Mamikonian soon returned to Armenia and drove Varazdat out of the country. After the dethroning of the last Arsacid king of Armenia in 428, the Mamikonians continued to hold the title of sparapet under Sasanian rule. In the first half of the 8th century, during the period of Arab rule in Armenia, the office of sparapet was usurped by the Bagratunis, the traditional rivals of the Mamikonians. Later on, the title was borne by members of the Pahlavuni family.

In the medieval Armenian Kingdom of Cilicia, the title of sparapet or gundstabl was no longer the hereditary privilege of one house. It was held by members of the Rubenid and Hethumid dynasties, as well as representatives of other noble houses.

== Modern usage ==
The 18th century commander Mkhitar Sparapet led the Armenian efforts for independence in the Syunik province of Armenia.

The title "Sparapet of Syunik" (Սյունյաց սպարապետ) was held by the Garegin Nzhdeh, as supreme commander of the Republic of Mountainous Armenia, in 1920–21.

The title is also used for the Grand Commander of the Knights of Vartan, an Armenian-American fraternal order. The title was held by Alex Manoogian during his leadership of that organization.

Vazgen Sargsyan, Armenia's Defense Minister in 1991-92 and 1995–99, is often informally referred to as Sparapet in recognition of his leadership during the First Nagorno-Karabakh War.

== Sources ==
- Bedrosian, Robert (1983). "The Sparapetut'iwn in Armenia in the Fourth and Fifth Centuries". Armenian Review. 36 (2): 6–46.
- Chaumont, M. L. (1986). "ARMENIA AND IRAN ii. The pre-Islamic period". Encyclopaedia Iranica, Vol. II, Fasc. 4. pp. 418–438.
- Garsoian, Nina (2005). "MAMIKONEAN FAMILY". Encyclopaedia Iranica.
- Eremyan, S. (1987). "Հայաստանը հելլենիստական դարաշրջանում" [Armenia During the Hellenistic Era]. In Hambardzumyan, Viktor (ed.). Soviet Armenian Encyclopedia (in Armenian). Vol. 13. Yerevan. pp. 97–100.
- Eremyan, S. (1984). "Պետական կառավարման սիստեմը։ Գործակալություններ" [The System of State Governance: Officialdoms]. Հայ ժողովրդի պատմություն [History of the Armenian People] (in Armenian). Vol. 2. Yerevan: Armenian SSR Academy of Sciences. pp. 139–147.
- Hambardzumyan, Viktor, ed. (1985). "Սպարապետություն". Soviet Armenian Encyclopedia (in Armenian). Vol. 11. Yerevan. p. 57.
- Krkyasharyan, S. M. (1994). "Պետական ապարատի կազմավորումը և նրա հետագա զարգացման փուլը հին Հայաստանում" [The formation and further development of state machinery in ancient Armenia.]. Patma-Banasirakan Handes. 1–2: 225–238.
- La Porta, Sergio (2018). "Sparapet". In Nicholson, Oliver (ed.). The Oxford Dictionary of Late Antiquity. Oxford: Oxford University Press. ISBN 978-0-19-866277-8.
- Toumanoff, Cyril (1963). Studies in Christian Caucasian History. Georgetown University Press. OCLC 505712128.

== See also ==
- Sempad the Constable
