= Hakob Manandyan =

Armenian historian and philologist (1873–1952)

- Հակոբ Մանանդյան
- Manandyan in 1951
- Born: Hakob Hamazaspi Manandyan; 22 November 1873; Akhaltsikhe, Russian Empire
- Died: 4 February 1952 (aged 78); Yerevan, Armenian SSR, Soviet Union
- Resting place: Komitas Pantheon, Yerevan, Armenia
- Scientific career
- Fields: History; philology
- Workplaces: Gevorgian Seminary, Nersisian School, Baku State University, Yerevan State University
- Doctoral students: Levon Khachikyan

Hakob Hamazaspi Manandyan (Armenian: Հակոբ Համազասպի Մանանդյան; 22 November 1873 – 4 February 1952) was an Armenian historian, philologist, and a member of the Academy of Sciences of the Soviet Union (1939) and the Academy of Sciences of Armenia (1943). He was awarded the Order of the Red Banner of Labour.

Among Manandyan's most notable works is A Critical Survey of the History of the Armenian People (vols. 1–3, 1945–57).

== Early life and education ==
Hamazasp Manandyan was born on 22 November 1873 in Akhaltsikhe, in what is now Georgia. He was the eldest of three children; his two younger siblings were his sister Astghik and his brother Arsen.

Manandyan received his primary education at the Karapetyan School in his hometown of Akhaltsikhe. From 1883 to 1893, he continued his education at the First Gymnasium of Tiflis. He then went to Germany and studied Philosophy at the University of Jena, whilst simultaneously attending Oriental and Linguistic courses in Leipzig and Strasbourg (1893–1897). His teachers were prominent orientalists and linguists of the time, including Heinrich Hübschmann, Berthold Delbrück, Eduard Sievers, Otto Schrader, and Karl Brugmann. Some of these scholars represented the trend in comparative linguistics of that era, which later influenced Manandyan's work.

Throughout his educational years, Manandyan extensively studied the works of ancient and contemporary authors. He wrote about Aristotle, Francis Bacon, Montesquieu, Jean-Jacques Rousseau, Immanuel Kant, Hegel, and Charles Darwin.

In the summer of 1897, Manandyan completed his studies at the university by defending his dissertation in Jena, which had a philological bent and was dedicated to the study of Movses Kaghankatvatsi's "The History of the World of Aghvank". His thesis judges were Berthold Delbrück and Heinrich Gelzer, whose recommendations led to the publication of Manandyan's work in Leipzig the same year.

Manandyan also graduated from the Faculty of Oriental Languages at Saint Petersburg University in Russia in 1898. Manandyan took exams externally in Persian Philology, Language, and History, and received a first-class diploma. To study at the aforementioned universities, Manandyan received a scholarship from philanthropist Alexander Mantashyan, which allowed him to obtain a broad education and master multiple ancient and modern languages alike, including Russian, German, French, English, Greek, Latin, Persian, Sanskrit, as well as Assyrian, Parthian, Hebrew, Ancient Greek, and Classical Armenian.

From 1898 to 1899, Manandyan spent time in London, Paris, Berlin, and Vienna to expand his scientific knowledge by visiting libraries and museums.

Manandyan was the Head of Forest Management and was made a part of the nobility.

== Teaching at Gevorgian Seminary ==
Upon receiving a receipt of an invitation from the administration of the Gevorgian Theological Seminary, Manandyan moved to Etchmiadzin at the end of 1899, where he worked until 1905.

At the seminary, he taught German, Greek literature, history of Greek philosophy, and English literature to the upper grades and the lecture division. In those years, Manandyan grew close to several members of the monastic brotherhood at the seminary, and actively participated in the life of the seminary by organizing various events, concerts, and theater plays.

During his years in Echmiadzin, Manandyan also engaged in scientific work, studying the spiritual and historical manuscripts of the Echmiadzin's Matenadaran (now the Mesrop Mashtots Institute of Ancient Manuscripts). In 1901, together with Professor F. Fink and E. Gyanjezyan, he founded the Armenological magazine "Zeitschrift für armenische Philologie," published in Armenian and German.

The journal published the scientific studies of Nicholas Adontz, Artashes Abeghyan, Hrachia Acharian, and others. Manandyan also published his scientific articles in the journal. The journal was published in Marburg, Germany. Due to financial difficulties it was discontinued after two years.

By the order of the Catholicos of All Armenians, in January 1902, Manandyan was appointed as assistant editor of the journal "Ararat", the official publication of the Mother See.

In addition to his teaching and scientific activities, Manandyan's years at the seminary were marked by meeting and marrying Varvara Tovmasi Khandamiryan, a teacher who descended from the noble Khandamiryan family of Shushi. The wedding of Hakob and Varvara Manandyans took place in the grand hall of the Gevorkian Seminary.

The Manandyans also had one daughter, Eleonora Manandyan (1907–1987), who became a psychiatrist and was given the title of Honored Doctor of the Armenian SSR.

In the spring of 1905, due to Turkish attacks on Armenians, the scientific group in Echmiadzin began to disband. As a result, Manandyan relocated with his family to the Armenian quarter of Tbilisi, where his wife's family and relatives also resided.

== Publicist and legal activities ==
Until 1907, Manandyan worked as a lecturer of Armenian, German, and Armenian Literary studies in the first and second Armenian male gymnasiums in Tbilisi. He also taught at Nersisian Armenian Apostolic Seminary in Tbilisi.

Manandyan continued his publicist activities by collaborating with the Arshaluys daily newspaper in Tbilisi, and thus from March 1906, he became its temporary editor. During those years, he published a series of articles criticizing the policy of the Imperial Government, arbitrary violence and oppression towards the small nations of the Empire.

Public speaking and teaching activities did not provide enough financial means to support the family, so he decided to study law as well.

Additionally, in 1909, he again passed exams as an extern at the University of Tartu (Dorpat), receiving a first-class diploma of Attorney-at-Law, after which he assumed the corresponding position in Baku, which at that time was mostly inhabited by Armenians and Armenian nobility. Alongside his practice of law, Manandyan taught at Baku People's University from 1911 to 1913, and later at a local trade school from 1915 to 1919. In 1917, Manandyan worked for the Armenian magazine "Gorts" published in Baku, where he published a number of articles on the ideas of national self-consciousness and national self-determination, emphasizing that the nation, being a historical living force, "fights against all the obstacles that hinder its free existence". He also offered pathways on how to implement national self-determination concepts.

== Science and the development of Armenia ==
In 1919, Manandyan returned to Armenia permanently, and actively participated in the founding of the first university. After that, he dedicated his life to the newly established Yerevan State University and Armenian students. In 1931, Manandyan stopped teaching at the university and devoted himself to scientific research.

In 1926, H. Manandyan was awarded the title of professor, and in 1935, the title of Honored Scientist of the USSR. He held the position of Scientific Secretary of the Institute of Science and Art of Armenia for multiple years. In 1939, he became the first and only representative of Armenia elected as a full member of the USSR Academy of Sciences in the field of history, and in 1943, he was confirmed as one of the first members of the Armenian SSR Academy of Sciences.

From 1939 to 1946, he was elected as a deputy of the Yerevan City Council of Workers' Deputies. He was a member of many scientific commissions, supervised the candidate and research work of young historians. On the occasion of his 75th birthday, he was awarded the Order of the Red Banner of Labour.

Manandyan died on 4 February 1952, at the age of 79. In recognition of his contribution to the establishment and development of Yerevan State University, Manandyan was buried in the courtyard of the university. In 2001, by decision of the Government of the Republic of Armenia, his remains were moved to the Komitas Pantheon.

On 21 December 1973, a scientific session of Yerevan State University and the Institute of History, dedicated to the 100th anniversary of Manandyan's birth, was held at the Academy of Sciences of the Armenian SSR. A street in the Shengavit administrative district of Yerevan is also named after the historian.

In 1937, the house of specialists on Teryan Street was built in Yerevan, where H. Manandyan was provided with an apartment and lived in for the rest of his life. To this day, there is a memorial stone dedicated to him at the entrance to the building. Currently, the great-granddaughter and sole heir of the scientist, Spiritual Teacher and public figure Eleonora Manandyan, lives in this house with her mother Satenik and daughter Tarieyl.

== Manandyan and the Yerevan State University ==
=== Foundation ===
After the declaration of the First Republic of Armenia, despite ongoing wars, famine, and epidemics, the Armenian intellectuals recognized the need for a national university. Although in Soviet-Armenian historiography the establishment of Yerevan State University is presented as an achievement of the Soviet regime, in reality, the national university was already functioning successfully before Armenia was sovietized.

On 16 May 1919, a law titled “On the Opening of a University in Armenia,” adopted by the Council of Ministers of the First Republic of Armenia, considered the establishment of a university in Yerevan with four faculties: historical-linguistic, economic-legal, medical, and physical-mathematical – with a technical department. Professor Yuri Ghambaryan was appointed as the University Inspector. Due to the lack of conditions for construction in Yerevan, the University was temporarily relocated to Alexandropol (Gyumri).

In a short time, Armenian intellectuals who had studied at universities around the world were gathered in Alexandropol, to teach the younger generation. Among them were Hakob Manandyan, Nicholas Adontz, Joseph Orbeli, Alexander Tamanyan, Manuk Abeghyan, Hrachia Acharian, as well as prominent foreign Armenologists Nikolai Marr, Antoine Meillet, and Josef Markwart.

On 8 March 1920, when instruction had just started, Manandyan requested to be appointed as a lecturer to teach "the Greek period and language of ancient Armenian bibliography, as well as the history of the development of the Armenian culture". In a letter dated 12 June 1920, he was informed that he had been chosen as the acting dean of the faculty and was offered to begin his duties.

As newspapers of that time wrote, the university was expected to serve as a bright cresset illuminating the path for the Armenian people. It is not surprising that, in those difficult conditions, when even the physical existence of the Armenian nation was in question, when the country was filled with refugees and the wounds of the Armenian Genocide were still bleeding, Armenians were thinking about science and culture. "A handful of Armenians, subjected to the torment of endless bloodshed and suffering, with a fervent impulse of heart and soul, aspired to beauty, to the fine arts, and to enlightened science," wrote the daily newspaper ‘Narod’ in its February 1920 issue.

On 21 June 1920, the Council of Ministers of the Armenian Republic decided to return the university to Yerevan, allocating the building of the educational seminary. Classes were to resume in early October, but due to the tense military situation, they were postponed despite the students' demands to continue.

After the establishment of Soviet rule in Armenia, Yerevan University was reorganized with the active participation of H. Manandyan. According to the first decree of Ashot Oganesyan, the first People's Commissar of Education of the Armenian SSR, signed on 17 December 1920 ("On the Reorganization of Yerevan University"), "Yerevan University was renamed Yerevan People's University, the faculties of the former university were closed, and two new faculties were created: the Faculty of Natural Sciences and the Faculty of Social Sciences." On 2 January 1921, the university council, through a secret vote, elected H. Manandyan as the rector, making him the first elected rector of the university.

The inauguration ceremony of Yerevan People's University took place on 23 January 1921, in the Shaumyan Workers' Club hall. During the event, Rector Manandyan emphasized the role of the university in the life of the Armenian people. "The Armenian Highlands were deprived of higher educational institutions, Armenian intellectuals acted and worked outside the country, and now they must return to Armenia to serve the scientific needs of the suffered working people. The educational council of the People's University widely opens the doors of this institution to those striving for science and hopes that together with the students, through joint efforts, they can build and develop this high and unique educational institution in Armenia," said H. Manandyan.

On 23 October 1923, Yerevan People's University was renamed the State University of the Armenian SSR. In 1930, on the basis of the technical, economic, medical, and pedagogical faculties of Alma Mater YSU, engineering-technical, trade-cooperative, medical, and pedagogical institutes were established, respectively. Thus, the higher education system of Armenia was formed on the basis of Yerevan State University.

=== Life in the University ===
His love for the university and dedication to the mission of education were vividly reflected in the letters he sent to his beloved wife Varya and daughter Eleonora, who was studying in Saint Petersburg. These letters reveal how dire the economic situation in Armenia was, especially in the early years of Soviet rule, affecting also scientists like Manandyan. Despite this, he wrote to his wife that all the money he received was sent to them and that he had no extra expenses because he "lived within the four walls of the university." This last phrase was literally true, as in the early 1920s, Manandyan lived with his mother, sister, and brother on the second floor of the university building. In a letter dated 19 October 1920, Manandyan wrote to his wife that his room had nothing but a sofa, "but these problems are now more than secondary".

Manandyan held the position of rector until October 1921, after which he led the Faculty of Oriental Studies (later known as Historiography) until October 1923.

In 1921, in a letter addressed to his wife and daughter, Manandyan mentioned his pessimism about the Faculty of Oriental Studies attracting a sufficient number of students, but he was mistaken. From the first period of the university's reopening, his faculty already had 50-60 students, and from subsequent letters, it is clear that this number reached 600 within a year. As Manandyan noted in one of his letters to his daughter, students came to Yerevan University from Baku, Tiflis, Gandzak, Rostov, and Iran because, according to the students, the lessons were "more serious" here. Nevertheless, professors at Yerevan University were paid three times less than their counterparts in Baku and Tiflis.

"Famine has begun on all sides; apparently, the government has neither money nor sufficient food supplies. It is difficult to predict what will happen next with our country," Manandyan wrote to his wife Varya, and then shifted to expressing enthusiasm for the university, "My only consolation here is this work of mine, which is successfully being realized."

In the harshest conditions of crisis, the existence of the university could only be maintained through numerous sacrifices of the Armenian intelligentsia. At the same time, students' desire for education was immense. During lectures, the classrooms were full, and sometimes students asked professors to practice with them on weekends. Manandyan wrote: "Day by day, I see how a magnificent work and new intellectual forces are being created for this unfortunate country." He noted that each of the other professors at Yerevan State University was a martyr who sacrificed their personal life for the people. It was at the invitation of Manandyan that Kostan Zarian, Melik Ohanjanian, and others taught at the Historiography Faculty. He continuously wrote letters and invited the best specialists to engage in educational work.

Thanks to Manandyan's lectures, students at the faculty became aware of the importance of the Armenian language and studied Old Armenian. He also regularly took students on archaeological expeditions to uncover ancient Armenian capitals.

The scholar also placed great importance on music. Through his efforts, a university student choir and orchestra were established. In one of his letters addressed to his daughter Eleonora, he also urged her not to neglect music—piano lessons, otherwise she would later regret it, as he did himself: “The Armenian soul is very enraged and saddened due to objective historical reasons. In my opinion, Armenians desperately need visual arts and music... It is through music and visual arts that Armenians should endure the unspoken sufferings of their past and alleviate the heavy burden of sorrow accumulated in our hearts.”

Most of the letters addressed to his wife and daughter were dedicated to the university and the nation. These were Manandyan's reflections, for which he almost apologized to his loved ones, saying that his letters were one-sided, as his entire life was connected with the university: “Our life never had any other content or direction.”

=== Resignation ===
In September 1923, Manandyan decided to step down from his position as dean.

After Manandyan, the Department of Historiography was headed by Manuk Abeghyan, while Manandyan continued to deliver his lectures on the history of the Armenian nation until 1931, simultaneously advancing scientific publications at the university. He wrote: "Unfortunately, our nation does not realize that it can contribute new insights even to the greatest European scholars through its university and its new generation, which, through the flames of suffering, have managed to develop new perspectives as deep as our own suffering." The bronze bust of Manandyan, installed in the lobby of the central building of Yerevan State University, symbolizes the role of the outstanding scholar and educator in the establishment, development, and advancement of university education and science.

== Legacy ==
Manandyan entered the field of Armenology as a philologist. His extensive research in philology and linguistics later defined the depth and versatility of the works of this renowned historian, dedicated to the history of the Armenian people. During his fruitful scientific career, he authored more than 150 works in Armenian, Russian, German, and other languages, leaving a distinguished mark on the development of Armenian historiography.

=== Philological research ===
Even during his years of teaching at the Gevorgyan Seminary in Etchmiadzin, Manandyan devoted much time to studying the rich manuscripts of the Matenadaran, publishing notable articles and reviews in the journal “Ararat”. According to the great Armenologist, a comprehensive understanding of Armenian history is impossible without a detailed study of Ancient Armenian and foreign sources. From this perspective, the research conducted by H. Acharian and H. Manandyan on Armenian martyrological literature of the 12th–19th centuries is very significant. As a result of this work, the two-volume “Armenian Neo-martyrs” was published in 1902, followed by a comparative-analytical edition of the same collection the following year. Manandyan's primary goal in compiling this work was to identify all sources that could be used to obtain reliable information about the internal life of Armenians under Muslim rule.

During his years of teaching at the seminary, Manandyan also worked on Armenian translations of Greek philosophical works, studying Grecophile texts. The eminent scholar had his own research method. He didn't work on a single cohesive task, he initially examined separate links in the overall chain and then proceeded to contextual and comprehensive research. The result of these studies were works such as "The Problem of David the Invincible in a New Light" (1904), "Excerpts from the Chronicle of Eusebius of Caesarea in an Ancient Manuscript" (1905), "Commentary on Aristotle's Categories Presented by Elias of Alexandria" (1911), and other works, notably the monumental monograph "The Grecophile School/ Hellenizing school- Грекофильская школа and its Periods of Development" (1925), which summarizes this entire period.

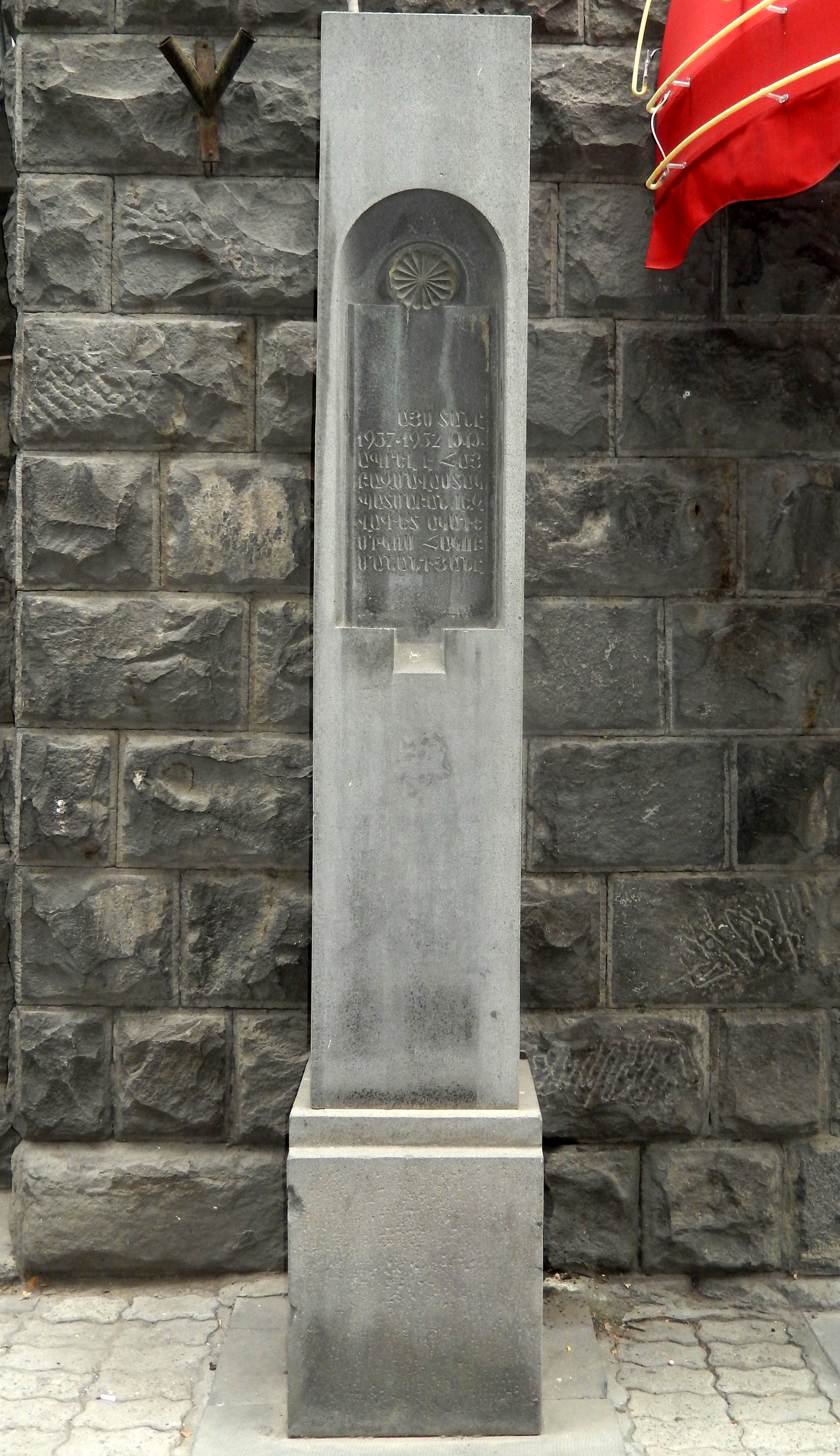
Hakob Manandyan's plaque on Teryan street, Yerevan

Among Manandyan's philological studies, special attention is given to his research on Movses Khorenatsi and his "History", Mesrop Mashtots and the invention of writing system, presented in a number of works.

The historian always proudly emphasized that the literary heritage of the Armenians is a valuable contribution to universal culture. "The extensive historical literature of the Armenians, the richest among all historical literatures of the Near East, serves as a valuable source for studying the history not only of Armenia but also of Persia, Byzantium, Georgia, Agvan, and almost all the peoples of the Near East", Manandyan said. The truth of these words is evidenced by hundreds of works by various world scholars, which include numerous excerpts from the works and research of Manandyan.

=== Episode on Manandyan’s Unknown Side ===
Many researchers studying Manandyan's life and work suggest that some episodes of the great scientist's life might have remained obscured. Specifically, very little is known about his student years, and it is difficult to determine what changes were made to many of his articles published during the Soviet period due to censorship practices of the time.

One of the unexplored periods of the scientist's life is revealed by a manuscript article presented by Manandyan's student, historian Petros Hovhannisyan, in 1990. This article, titled "The Influence of Buddhism," was written by Manandyan during his studies in Germany. Petros Hovhannisyan noted that, unfortunately, it was not possible to determine to whom the article was addressed or why it was not published. The manuscript is currently preserved in the collection of the Armenian Publishing House of the Caucasus named after Charents. In the mentioned article, Manandyan, presenting the rapid development of science, emphasized that among the old Teachings, Buddhism in particular began to attract the attention and respect of scientists.

=== Contribution to Historiography ===
The Exceptional Mission of Manandyan's scientific work was his comprehensive study of Armenian history, characterized by exceptional impartiality and meticulousness. The scientific legacy of Manandyan the historian covers the history of the Armenian people from the 6th century BC to the 15th century AD. Despite his immense patriotism and boundless love for the Armenian people, he rejected falsification and excessive emotion in academic work. The study and clarification of sources was of particular importance for the historian. Manandyan emphasized, “When examining each historical book, it is necessary to pay attention first of all to the reliability of the facts, accuracy, research method, carefully examine historical sources, trying to filter the truth from delusion, narratives and legends from historical reality, and ignorant, biased or deliberate judgments of ancient historians from an impartial objective attitude to historical milestones” Manandyan wrote.

From this perspective, one of Manandyan's most notable works is "Tigranes II and Rome a new interpretation based on primary sources". Prior to this work, the history of Tigran II's reign had been studied in a compressed and limited manner by Western historians. These historians relied primarily on accounts from Roman chroniclers who were hostile to Armenia and Pontus, intentionally distorting events and downplaying Armenia's role, presenting Tigran the Great as a minor historical figure. In his monograph, Manandyan subjected Roman sources to meticulous critical analysis and reevaluation, exposing the one-sidedness and often falsehood of the information they provided about Tigran the Great and Armenia. As in all his works, Manandyan used only those primary sources that withstood scrutiny for reliability. He frequently quoted all existing evidences from various primary sources about the same historical event or issue, compared them, and only then provided his conclusions. This work is considered the best monograph on Tigran II's reign and his era, and while previously world history recognized only Carthage as a formidable opponent to Rome, Manandyan demonstrated how Armenia was also capable of resisting Rome.

As the famous historian Boris Grekov rightly noted, Manandyan “was able to correctly determine the state of Armenology and direct his efforts where they could yield the greatest results.” From this point of view, the work done by the historian in the direction of studying the socio-economic life of ancient Armenia is invaluable, thanks to which he made possible a comprehensive analysis of Armenian history. Among his works in this area are "Notes on the Status of Peasants in Ancient Armenia During the Marzpans" (1925), "Royal Taxes in Armenia During the Marzpans" (1926), "Materials on the Economic Life of Ancient Armenia" (1927), "Feudalism in Ancient Armenia" (1934), "Cities of Armenia in the 10th–11th Centuries" (1940), and "Trade and Cities of Armenia in Relation to Ancient World Trade" (1960). These works provide detailed descriptions of medieval Armenia's internal life from social, legal, and economic perspectives, including land ownership forms, etc., up to various measures and weights used. In fact, by studying the socio-economic life of ancient and medieval Armenia, Manandyan founded a new direction in the development of Armenian historiography, illuminating previously unexplored complex and intricate issues, thereby going beyond the framework of national history and representing great significance for the study of the history of the ancient world - especially the countries of Central Asia.

Manandyan is sometimes criticized in connection with one of his theories suggesting that the Armenian nation was formed as a result of the mixing of indigenous tribes of the Armenian Highlands and incoming Armenians. Manandyan was essentially restoring Armenian historiography from scratch on one hand, while on the other hand, he was under strict control and limitations imposed by Soviet authorities. For the USSR, which had close ties with Turkey, it was important to suppress the topic of Armenian origins as much as possible, and it was forbidden to even talk about Western Armenia, occupied by Turkey. In 1930, Manandyan proposed a migration hypothesis, but during World War II, this theory began to be refuted. Based on the research of E. Forrer and later P. Kretschmer, the Hayasa hypothesis arose, which was soon accepted by Manandyan himself.

For many years, while studying various political, socio-economic, and cultural events in the history of the Armenian nation, Manandyan, during the difficult days of the Patriotic War, began work on a comprehensive and summarizing work—a multi-volume series titled "Critical Review of the History of the Armenian Nation." The aim was to illuminate the history of the Armenian Nation from the 6th century BC to the 15th century AD based on a detailed comparative study of primary sources. In this collection, Manandyan managed not only to give an extensive and systematic scientific presentation of the ancient and medieval history of the Armenian people, but also to identify the internal cause-and-effect relationship of historical events, and also made a number of topographic and chronological clarifications that became a new word on many important historical issues.

In 1973, on the 100th anniversary of the outstanding scientist's birth, at the behest of the president of the Armenian SSR Academy of Sciences, the Institute of History began preparing a complete edition of Manandyan's works, and six of the planned eight volumes were published.

The materials of this chapter are only a small part of the legacy left by the distinguished scholar. Over the years, his students have repeatedly attempted to compile a complete bibliography—particularly by the historian Petros Hovhannisyan in the article "Contemporaries on Manandyan," and by L. Babayan and V. Hakobyan in the article "Hakob Manandyan: Life and Work" among others.

== Manandyan in memoirs and letters ==
=== Memories of the Seminary ===
During his years at the seminary, Manandyan enjoyed the love and respect of the Catholicos of All Armenians, Patriarch Khrimian Hayrik. When meeting with foreign guests, His Holiness always turned to Manandyan for translation. Once, he asked the historian a rhetorical question, expressing his amazement at "how so much knowledge can fit into such a small head?"

Before the Armenian Genocide, teachers and students from the Gevorgyan Seminary periodically traveled to Western Armenia. During one of these visits, the Seminary choir, led by Komitas, sang at the Cathedral of Ani. This performance deeply impressed Manandyan, who, although he had visited leading countries in Europe and listened to many popular performances, later admitted to his brother that he had never heard such an execution anywhere else. Manandyan and Komitas were very close friends, and Komitas often visited Manandyan.

=== Teacher ===
Manandyan's role as a professor is evident in the memories of his students. Simon Vratsian, a prominent statesman and Manandyan's student at the Gevorgyan Seminary, wrote about the profound impact Manandyan's speech had on everyone. In his address to the seminary students, Manandyan spoke about the current state of the nation and the responsibility of the seminarians. “Our nation is ignorant, our nation is oppressed, our nation is unhappy... You must be prepared to comfort the pain of the nation. You are the hope of the nation.”

In the recollections of students from Yerevan University, Manandyan was described as an irreplaceable and outstanding teacher. When delivering lectures, he didn't just present material; he transported students to the period he was describing with his carefully chosen words. He always came to class thoroughly prepared, even though the material he taught was his life's work. His lectures gave listeners the impression that the history of Armenia was the very meaning of his life. He spoke of the Armenian people with special love and tenderness, which was reflected even in his voice and gestures. Historian Ashot Artsruni described his professor in his memoirs: “Pride and joy shone on his face when he spoke of the bright moments in Armenian history. His voice would become angry and his eyes would redden when he mentioned conflicts and injustices inflicted upon Armenians.” Artsruni's memoirs also recount another of Manandyan's speeches, which vividly displayed the renowned historian's faith in the revival of the Armenian nation. In 1922, during the final lecture of the University's first academic year, where Manandyan had to summarize the year's material, he seemed to abstract himself from the Soviet reality and began to represent the struggle for Armenia's liberation and independence over the past centuries, starting with the forefather Hayk Nahapet.

Enumerating the invasions and attempts at assimilation and destruction by ancient invaders and countries, most of which had disappeared long ago, becoming only history, Manandyan proudly presented the Armenian position against these winds. Concluding his speech, he said: “You have seen that the Armenian people had always fought for their freedom and independence throughout their history. Every time they were deprived of their free life, they still fought and restored the independence of their country. And I am confident that this time too, they will throw off the yoke of foreign dominion and restore the independence of our Homeland.” His words were received with thunderous applauses from the students.

== Personal life ==
Manandyan's parents immigrated to Akhaltsikhe from the Karin region of Western Armenia during one of the oppression of Armenians by Turkey. This is evidenced by the Karin traditions preserved in his family, and the elements of dialect in their speech.

Manandyan's brother, Arsen Manandyan, was a renowned engineer and one of the founders of Yerevan Polytechnic University. After the death of Manandyan's wife (1939), he took on the responsibility of caring for his brother, as Manandyan's daughter was living separately with her newborn son at that time. In the last years of his life, Manandyan focused all his efforts on exploring still unresearched topics, trying to devote as little time as possible to other issues. In this regard, the support of Arsen and his sister Astghik was vital in managing the household, who actually dedicated themselves to their distinguished brother. They also made an effort to take care of Hakob's needs while minimizing interference with his scientific work. Even after Manandyan's death, his brother dedicated all his efforts to publishing the historian's unique manuscripts.

In his letters to his wife and daughter, Manandyan addressed them with special tenderness. He exhorted his daughter to write letters in Armenian, and repeatedly asked her to definitely learn Classical Armenian, and he rejoiced when reading his daughter's letters written in Grabar. It was thanks to such an upbringing that his daughter Eleonora Manandyan, being a recognized psychiatrist in Moscow, settled permanently in Yerevan in 1938 and took up both practical psychiatry and scientific work.

Armenian poet Hovhannes Tumanyan was among Manandyan's close friends. They both maintained warm relationships, including with their families. Even in their youth, the Manandyans were frequent guests at the famous centre of the Armenian intelligentsia "Vernatun" in the Armenian quarter of Tiflis, and Varya in her youth was called "Vernatun's daughter" (since very few female representatives attended meetings of the intelligentsia). Tumanyan's admiration for Varya inspired the poet to some extent.

In 1908, when Manandyan was in Petersburg preparing for the external exams of the University of Dorpat, the intellectual seemed to predict the impending destructive revolution in the empire, which he hinted at in his letter to Tumanyan: “It seems they no longer recognize the purity and truth of their pre-revolutionary faith... and are now patching up their old God. Indeed, the intellectual sector of Petersburg, especially the students, works, studies, and contemplates. The revolution is now taking place in the depths of their minds and souls. Contrary to the common opinion, it seems to me that the revolution in Russia has not only stopped but is deepening, spreading, and becoming threatening. For me, our Armenian reality... without religion causes great sadness. Apparently, we have nothing to patch and repair.”

Manandyan was also noted for his exceptional modesty. When the Soviet government offered prominent academics residences in various cities of the Union, he consistently declined. He turned down an offered apartment in Moscow in the House of Scientists on Leninsky Avenue, as well as a country house in Crimea. In response to the authorities’ proposal, he responded that he would prefer a dacha in the outskirts of Yerevan. But since building a dacha near Yerevan was impossible, the academic agreed to have a dacha allocated to him in the Moscow region village of Mozhinka – a well-known settlement built for outstanding academics of the USSR. He hoped that by spending summer there, he could possibly recover (from malaria, from which he had been suffering for a long time) and continue his work in winter.

=== Personal Character ===
Being a very kind person, Manandyan turned out to be extremely rigorous when it came to science and scientific work. First and foremost, he was strict with himself. When starting a new research, he chose topics that were poorly studied and only after long and thorough work with sources and extensive preparation he began writing. He was also strict with other scientists. Constantly reviewing new researches, he paid particular attention to the proper use of sources. Manandyan considered scientists who incorrectly presented the sources they used as blasphemers.

Contemporary accounts indicate that the scientist wrote with exceptional clarity, submitting manuscripts to publishers in neat, legible handwriting.

Academician Boris Grekov spoke with particular respect about Manandyan. According to him, Manandyan's main achievement was his critical and detailed analysis of all the information about Armenia that reached us from ancient authors.

Manandyan believed that more fruitful results in the field of historiography could be achieved if archaeologists devoted their efforts to studying ancient Armenian sites such as Armavir, Yervandashat, and others. “Our young scientists should keep in mind that studying and writing the history of the Armenian nation should not be done by blindly importing and accumulating previous opinions, but on the basis of new analysis of primary sources, which will allow the re-examination of old problems and an impartial illumination of many episodes in the history of the Armenian nation” said Manandyan.

== Works ==
- Manandyan, Hakob (1897). Contributions to Albanian History (in German). Leipzig: Breitkopf & Härtel.
- Manandyan, Hakob (1902). "Note on the Study of the Inner Life of the Armenians" (PDF). Ararat (in Armenian) (2). Vagharshapat: 161–171.
- Manandyan, Hakob (1902). "Review of "S. T.: On the Order of Production of Marital Affairs in the Armenian Gregorian Church"" (PDF). Ararat (in Armenian) (2). Vagharshapat: 171–172.
- Manandyan, Hakob (1902). "Review of "A. Anninsky: History of the Armenian Church (up to 19th century)"" (PDF). Ararat (in Armenian) (3–4). Vagharshapat: 335–342.
- Manandyan, Hakob (1902). "Review of "M. Corelli: The Mighty Atom"" (PDF). Ararat (in Armenian) (3–4). Vagharshapat: 345–347.
- Manandyan, Hakob; Adjarian, Hrachia (1902). Armenian Neo-martyrs: Volume I (1155-1485) (in Armenian). Vagharshapat: The printing house of the Mother See of Holy Etchmiadzin. Archived from the original on 16 January 2020.
- Manandyan, Hakob; Adjarian, Hrachia (1902). Armenian Neo-martyrs: Volume II (1486-1843) (in Armenian). Vagharshapat: The printing house of the Mother See of Holy Etchmiadzin. Archived from the original on 24 January 2020.
- Manandyan, Hakob (1928). Materials About the Economic History of Ancient Armenia: Vol. II (in Armenian). Yerevan.
- Manandyan, Hakob (1929). "H. H. Manandyan's Speech at the Askanaz Mravyan Funeral". Khorhrdayin Hayastan (in Armenian) (245). Yerevan: 1.
- Manandyan, Hakob (1930). The Weights and Dimensions in the Ancient Armenian Sources (in Armenian). Yerevan: Melkonyan Fund.
- Manandyan, Hakob (1930). "Old Roads of Armenia According to Tabula Peutingeriana". Revue des Études Arméniennes (in Armenian). X (1). Paris: Sorbonne University: 139–142. ISSN 0080-2549. OCLC 1605433. Archived from the original on 4 March 2016.
- Manandyan, Hakob (1930). "Old Roads of Armenia According to Tabula Peutingeriana". Revue des Études Arméniennes (in French). X (1). Translated by Frédéric Macler. Paris: Sorbonne University: 143–145. ISSN 0080-2549. OCLC 1605433. Archived from the original on 4 March 2016.
- Manandyan, Hakob (1930). "Old Roads of Armenia According to Tabula Peutingeriana". Revue des Études Arméniennes (in German). X (1). Translated by Unknown. Paris: Sorbonne University: 143–145. ISSN 0080-2549. OCLC 1605433. Archived from the original on 4 March 2016.
- Manandyan, Hakob (1930). About Trade and the Cities of Armenia in Connection with the Global Trade of Ancient Times (in Russian) (1st ed.). Yerevan: PetHrat.
- Manandyan, Hakob (1931). "Old Roads of Armenia According to Tabula Peutingeriana". Teghekagir (in Armenian) (5). Yerevan: Arm. SSR Institute of Arts and Science: 65–89.
- Manandyan, Hakob (1931). Old Roads of Armenia According to Tabula Peutingeriana (in Armenian) (1st ed.). Yerevan.
- Manandyan, Hakob (1932). Small Studies (PDF) (in Armenian and German). Yerevan: Melkonyan Fund.
- Manandyan, Hakob (1932). Notes about the Feud and the Feudal Army of Parthia and Arsacid Armenia (PDF) (in Russian). Tiflis: The Academy of Sciences of the USSR.
- Manandyan, Hakob (1932–1933). "Solution of Khorenatsi Mystery". Anahit (in Armenian) (3–6). Paris: 182–185.
- Manandyan, Hakob (1933). Solution of Khorenatsi Mystery (in Armenian, German, and Russian). Yerevan.
- Small Soviet Encyclopedia, Volume I (1933). "Armenia" article (in Russian) (2nd ed.). Moscow: Soviet Encyclopedia. pp. 503–506.
- Manandyan, Hakob (1934). Eratosthenes's Stadion and Persian Asparez (in Armenian, German, and Russian). Yerevan: Melkonyan Fund.
- Manandyan, Hakob (1934). Solution of Khorenatsi Mystery (extended) (in Armenian, German, and Russian). Yerevan: PetHrat.
- Manandyan, Hakob (1934). Feudalism in Ancient Armenia (in Armenian). Yerevan: Melkonyan Fund.
- Manandyan, Hakob (1935). "Medieval Itinerarium in the 10th Century Armenian Manuscripts". Academy of Sciences of the USSR (in Russian). XLV. Moscow-Leningrad: 723–728.
- Manandyan, Hakob (1936). Old Roads of Armenia According to Tabula Peutingeriana (in Armenian, German, and Russian) (2nd ed.). Yerevan: Melkonyan Fund.
- Manandyan, Hakob (1937). "Speech at the Extraordinary Congress of the Armenian SSR Council". Khorhrdayin Hayastan (in Armenian) (67). Yerevan: 2.
- Manandyan, Hakob (1938). "The Grand Celebration (to Celebrate the 1000th Anniversary of Armenian Folk Epic Poem "Daredevils of Sassoun")". Kommunist (in Russian) (229): 3.
- Theon (1938). Hakob Manandyan (ed.). On Rhetoric (in Armenian, Ancient Greek, German, and Russian). Yerevan: Arm. SSR Institute of Arts and Science.
- Manandyan, Hakob (1939). The Popular Rebellions in Armenia Against the Arabic Dominion (in Armenian). Yerevan: Arm. SSR State University Publishing House.
- Manandyan, Hakob (1939). "H. H. Manandyan's Speech at the Jubilee Session to Celebrate the 1000th Anniversary of Armenian Folk Epic Poem "Daredevils of Sassoun"". Khorhrdayin Hayastan (in Armenian) (213). Yerevan: 3.
- Manandyan, Hakob (1939). "Revived Armenia". Sovietskaya Nauka (in Russian) (12). Moscow: 141–145.
- Manandyan, Hakob (1939). "The Circular Path of Pompey in Transcaucasia". Vestnik Drevnei Istorii (in Russian) (4): 70–82.
- Manandyan, Hakob (1939). The Popular Rebellions in Armenia Against the Arabic Dominion (in Russian). Yerevan: Arm. SSR State University Publishing House.
- Manandyan, Hakob (1939). "Raising the Young Cadres". Izvestia (in Russian) (24): 3.
- Manandyan, Hakob (1939). "The Speech of the Academic H. H. Manandyan (at the Meeting of the Academic Council of Arm. BAS on the Occasion of His Election to the Full Membership of the AS of the USSR)". Kommunist (in Russian) (30): 3.
- Manandyan, Hakob (1940). "The Speech of the Academic H. H. Manandyan at the Jubilee Scientific Session of the Armenian Branch of the Academy of Sciences of the USSR". Sovetakan Hayastan (in Armenian) (270): 1.
- Manandyan, Hakob (1940). "Academic I. A. Javakhishvili. An Obituary". Sovetakan Hayastan (in Armenian) (271): 1.
- Manandyan, Hakob (1940). "The Speech of the Deputy H. H. Manandyan at the First Session of the City Council of the Deputies of the Workers of Yerevan". Khorhrdayin Hayastan (in Armenian) (2): 1.
- Manandyan, Hakob (1940). Cities of Armenia in the 10-11 Centuries (in Armenian). Yerevan: Armenian Branch of the Academy of Sciences of the USSR.
- Manandyan, Hakob (1940). Tigranes II and Rome (Under a New Light According to the Sources) (in Armenian). Yerevan: Armenian Branch of the Academy of Sciences of the USSR.
- Manandyan, Hakob (1940). "Actual Questions of the Historiography of the Ancient Armenia". Istorik-Marxist (in Russian) (6): 3–6.
- Manandyan, Hakob (1940). "An Outstanding Scientist (Academician I. A. Javakhishvili)". Kommunist (in Russian) (271). Yerevan: 4.
- Manandyan, Hakob (1940). "Routes of the Pontic Campaign of Pompey and the Way of the Retreat of Mithradates to Colchis". Vestnik Drevnei Istorii (FTP) (in Russian). pp. 89–100. (To view documents see Help:FTP)
- Manandyan, Hakob (1940). "A Preface to the Study "Tigranes II and Rome"". Kommunist (in Russian) (36). Yerevan: 3.
- Manandyan, Hakob (1940). "The Speech of the Deputy H. H. Manandyan at the First Session of the City Council of the Deputies of the Workers of Yerevan". Kommunist (in Russian) (2). Yerevan: 1.
- Manandyan, Hakob (1941). "Shoulder to Shoulder with All the Nation". Sovetakan Hayastan (in Armenian) (148). Yerevan: 1.
- Manandyan, Hakob (1941). "To All the Armenians of Foreign Countries". Sovetakan Hayastan (in Armenian) (195). Yerevan: 1.
- Manandyan, Hakob (1941). "To All the Armenians of Foreign Countries". Sovetakan Grakanutyun (in Armenian) (8). Yerevan: 3–4.
- Manandyan, Hakob (1940). Mesrop Mashtots and the Struggle of the Armenian People for the Cultural Identity (in Russian). Yerevan: Armenian Branch of the Academy of Sciences of the USSR. Archived from the original on 19 December 2017.
- Manandyan, Hakob (1941). "To All the Armenians of Foreign Countries". Izvestia Arm. FANa SSSR (in Russian) (7). Yerevan: 3–6.
- Manandyan, Hakob (1941). "To All the Armenians of Foreign Countries". Kommunist (in Russian) (194). Yerevan: 1.
- Manandyan, Hakob (1941). "To All the Armenians of Foreign Countries". Pravda (in Russian) (227). Moscow: 3.
- Manandyan, Hakob (1942). "The Voice of the History" (PDF). Banvoragyughatsiakan Karmir Banaki Martik (in Armenian) (9). Tbilisi: 2.
