= Buzandaran Patmutiwnk =

Buzandaran Patmutʻiwnkʻ ("Epic Histories", Armenian: Բուզանդարան Պատմութիւնք) is a history of 4th-century Armenia, presumably composed in the 470s. The author of the work is unknown. Until recently it had been assumed that it was written by a certain Faustus (also Faustus the Byzantine, Armenian: Փաւստոս Բուզանդ, romanized: P'awstos Buzand); however, his existence is now disputed. Nina Garsoïan argues that the author was an anonymous cleric who was sympathetic to the nobility and had some competence in preaching. The book starts with the death of Gregory the Illuminator in 331 and concludes with the partition of Armenia between Iran and Rome in 387.

While pro-Christian in content, it is written in the style of the oral Armenian epics associated with pre-Christian culture and drew from such oral sources. Scholars have identified three main parallel strands in Buzandaran Patmut‘iwnk‘: a royal history, focusing on the reigns of the last Arsacid kings of Armenia; an ecclesiastical history, giving an account of the hereditary succession of Patriarchs of Armenia from the house of Gregory the Illuminator; and the Mamikonian history, telling the story of the hereditary sparapets (generals-in-chief) of Armenia from that noble house. Faustus portrays the Mamikonians as the great defenders of Armenia, who show undying loyalty to the unworthy Arsacid kings.

Along with the Patmutʻiwn Hayotsʻ ("History of Armenia") of Movses Khorenatsi (5th century or later), the Buzandaran Patmutʻiwnk‘ has been referred to as one of the best Armenian sources in Parthian and Sasanian-related studies. It has been noted by both Garsoïan and James R. Russell for its numerous reflections of Iranian, particularly Parthian, traditions.

== Identity of author, date and language ==
Scholars have long debated the issue of the identity and ethnic origin of the author of Buzandaran Patmut‘iwnk‘, as well as the date and original language of the work. The author gives virtually no information about himself in the work; a note at the end of Book Three in which the author is identified as "Pʻawstos Biwzand the great historian who was a Greek chronicler" has been deemed a later addition. Not long after Buzandaran Patmut‘iwnk‘ was composed, another early Armenian historian, Ghazar Parpetsi, commented on the work and concluded that it had originally been written by a "Byzantine scholar" named P‘ostos from Constantinople, but was later modified by some other "ignorant" author who could not have been educated in Byzantium. Following Parpetsi, most older scholars believed the original author of Buzandaran Patmut’iwnk’ to have been a Greek or a Hellenized Armenian writing in the 4th century, with the work being translated into Armenian after the invention of the Armenian alphabet in the 5th century. Later scholarship has demonstrated that the work was originally composed in Armenian and that the author could not have been a contemporary of the 4th-century events described by him. Nina Garsoïan writes that the work was most likely written in the 470s.

Some early scholars attempted to identify Pʻawstos the author with a Greek bishop of the same name mentioned by the author as an associate of Nerses I, as well as another bishop named Faustus mentioned in the correspondence of Basil of Caesarea, although this is no longer considered tenable as the work has conclusively been dated to the 5th century. In Garsoïan's view, the actual author of Buzandaran Patmut‘iwnk‘ remains anonymous, while later medieval authors anachronistically attributed the work to the bishop Pʻawstos mentioned in the text. (Note: According to another hypothesis, the author himself attributed his work to a different person, fearing backlash for the folk elements in his work that could offend ecclesiastical sensibilities.) Garsoïan later described it as an "anonymous compilation of oral records". The epithet Buzand or Buzandats’i was traditionally interpreted as "Byzantine" or "from Byzantium," and was changed at an early date to the more accurate Armenian form Biwzandats’i. This corresponds with the theory that ascribes a Greek origin to the author. However, this left unexplained the original title of the work, Buzandaran Patmut’iwnk’. By analyzing this title, Iranologist Anahit Perikhanian concluded that Buzandaran is composed of an Iranian word meaning "a reciter of epic poems, a bard", and -aran, a suffix indicating location in both Iranian languages and Armenian. (Note: Stepan Malkhasiants had earlier tentatively proposed a similar etymology.) Thus, Buzandaran Patmut’iwnk’ can be translated as "Epic Histories" or "Epic Tales," and the association with Byzantium was rooted in a misunderstanding of this Iranian term.

As far as can be concluded from the work, the author of Buzandaran Patmut‘iwnk‘ was an Armenian cleric who was deeply invested in ecclesiastical matters and supported the Nicene orthodoxy of the Armenian church against the Arianism of the 4th-century Roman emperors and Armenian kings. He was a skilled preacher who wrote in an elevated style of Classical Armenian, but was probably not a particularly learned man. Additionally, he had a conservative aristocratic bent and strongly supported the privilege of the descendants of Gregory the Illuminator to hereditarily hold the Armenian patriarchate. Garsoïan also tentatively proposes that the author may have been from the Armenian region of Taron, which would explain his fanatical support for the Mamikonian rulers of that region. James R. Russell further adds that the author must have been an Armenian "steeped in the Iranian traditions of the newly Christianized land."

== Content ==
Buzandaran Patmut‘iwnk‘ describes events from the military, socio-cultural and political life of Arsacid-ruled Greater Armenia in the 4th century, starting with the death of Gregory the Illuminator in 331 and concluding with the partition of Armenia between Iran and Rome in 387. While pro-Christian in content, it is written in the style of the oral Armenian epics associated with pre-Christian culture and drew from such oral sources. Scholars have identified three main parallel strands in Buzandaran Patmut‘iwnk‘: a royal history, focusing on the reigns of the last Arsacid kings of Armenia; an ecclesiastical history, giving an account of the hereditary succession of Patriarchs of Armenia from the house of Gregory the Illuminator; and the Mamikonian history, telling the story of the hereditary sparapets (generals-in-chief) of Armenia from that noble house. Faustus portrays the Mamikonians as the great defenders of Armenia, who show undying loyalty to the unworthy Arsacid kings.

=== Books ===
Buzandaran Patmut‘iwnk‘ consists of a "Preliminary Statement" and four "books" or "registers" (dprut‘iwnk‘), beginning with Book Three ("Beginning") and ending with Book Six ("Ending"), which appears to be due to the work of a later editor of the surviving manuscript. The incongruence between the numbering of Book Three and its title has led to debates among scholars on whether or not there were originally first and second books that were lost. Other scholars have suggested that the work is complete but was included in a collection of other texts.

=== Sources ===
The author of Buzandaran Patmut‘iwnk‘ never cites specific sources and only refers to other written texts in the first chapter of the work. He extensively quotes the Armenian translation of the Bible, as well as some other Christian texts. The author makes references to Koriwn's Life of Mashtots and the work of Agathangelos. He does not appear to have been familiar with the works of classical or other foreign authors. The author's main source for information, regardless of its ultimate source, was the oral tradition of Armenia's past as told in the tales and songs related by bards (gusans) in his own time.

== Publications and translations ==
Buzandaran Patmut’iwnk’ has a late manuscript history compared with other major Armenian histories, with the earliest known manuscript dating to 1599 (Jerusalem 341), excluding a fragmentary manuscript from 1224 (Venice 673). It was first published in 1730 in Constantinople. A French translation by Mkrtich Emin was published in 1867. A German translation by M. Lauer appeared in 1879. A translation into Modern Armenian was published with an introduction and explanatory notes by Stepan Malkhasiants in Yerevan in 1947. A Russian translation with commentary was published in Yerevan in 1953. In 1985, Robert Bedrosian published an English translation. Nina Garsoïan published an English translation with an introduction and commentary in 1989.

== Sources ==
- Andrews, Tara (2018). "Buzandaran Patmut'iwnk' (Epic Histories)". In Nicholson, Oliver (ed.). The Oxford Dictionary of Late Antiquity. Vol. 1. Oxford University Press. pp. 274–275. doi:10.1093/acref/9780198662778.001.0001. ISBN 978-0-19-866277-8.
- Arzumanian, Makich, ed. (1986). "Pʻavstos Buzand" Փավստոս Բուզանդ. Haykakan sovetakan hanragitaran Հայկական սովետական հանրագիտարան [Armenian Soviet Encyclopedia] (in Armenian). Vol. 12. Erevan. pp. 313–314.
- Garsoïan, Nina (2005). "Armenian historiography in crisis". In Straw, Carole; Lim, Richard (eds.). The Past Before Us: The Challenge of Historiographies of Late Antiquity. Brepols Publishers. ISBN 9782503514567.
- Garsoïan, Nina G. (1989). The Epic Histories Attributed to Pʻawstos Buzand (Buzandaran Patmutʻiwnkʻ). Cambridge, Massachusetts: Harvard University Press. ISBN 0-674-25865-7.
- Greenwood, Tim (2008). "Sasanian Reflections in Armenian Sources" (PDF). E-Sasanika. 3: 1–30.
- Łazar Pʻarpecʻi (1991). The History of Łazar Pʻarpecʻi. Translated by Thomson, Robert W. Atlanta: Scholars Press. ISBN 1-55540-579-7.
- Melik-Bakhshian, St. T. (1996) [Orig. published 1979]. Hayotsʻ patmutʻyan aghbyuragitutʻyun Հայոց պատմության աղբյուրագիտություն [Source study for Armenian history] (in Armenian) (3rd ed.). Erevani hamalsarani hratarakchʻutʻyun. pp. 78–88.
- Pʻavstos Buzand (1968). Patmutʻyun hayotsʻ Պատմություն հայոց (in Armenian). Translation, introduction, and commentary by Stepan Malkhasiants. Erevan: Hayastan.
- P'awstos Buzand (1985). P'awstos Buzand's History of the Armenians. Translated by Bedrosian, Robert. New York: Sources of the Armenian Tradition.
- Russell, James R. (2004). Armenian and Iranian studies. Harvard Armenian Texts and Studies 9. Harvard University Press. ISBN 978-0935411195.
- Russell, James R. (1999). "Faustus". In Yarshater, Ehsan (ed.). Encyclopædia Iranica (Online ed.). Encyclopædia Iranica Foundation. (Print version: Vol. IX, Fasc. 5, pp. 449–451.)
