= 309 =

309 in various calendars
Gregorian calendar	309; CCCIX
Ab urbe condita	1062
Assyrian calendar	5059
Balinese saka calendar	230–231
Bengali calendar	−285 – −284
Berber calendar	1259
Buddhist calendar	853
Burmese calendar	−329
Byzantine calendar	5817–5818
Chinese calendar	戊辰年 (Earth Dragon); 3006 or 2799 — to — 己巳年 (Earth Snake); 3007 or 2800
Coptic calendar	25–26
Discordian calendar	1475
Ethiopian calendar	301–302
Hebrew calendar	4069–4070
- Hindu calendars
Vikram Samvat	365–366
Shaka Samvat	230–231
Kali Yuga	3409–3410
Holocene calendar	10309
Iranian calendar	313 BP – 312 BP
Islamic calendar	323 BH – 322 BH
Javanese calendar	189–190
Julian calendar	309; CCCIX
Korean calendar	2642
Minguo calendar	1603 before ROC 民前1603年
Nanakshahi calendar	−1159
Seleucid era	620/621 AG
Thai solar calendar	851–852
Tibetan calendar	ས་ཕོ་འབྲུག་ལོ་ (male Earth-Dragon); 435 or 54 or −718 — to — ས་མོ་སྦྲུལ་ལོ་ (female Earth-Snake); 436 or 55 or −717

Diocesis of Hispania

Year 309 (CCCIX) was a common year starting on Saturday of the Julian calendar. In the Roman Empire, it was known as the Year of the Consulship of Licinianus and Constantius (or, less frequently, year 1062 Ab urbe condita). The denomination 309 for this year has been used since the early medieval period, when the Anno Domini calendar era became the prevalent method in Europe for naming years.

== Events ==
=== By place ===
==== Roman Empire ====
- Gaius Ceionius Rufius Volusianus, the Praetorian Prefect of Emperor Maxentius, defeats the usurper Domitius Alexander and purges Africa of his supporters.

==== Persia ====
- King Hormizd II, ruler of the Sassanid Empire, demands that the king of the Ghassanids pays tribute. After the king refuses, Hormizd invades Ghassanid territory. The Ghassanids seek aid from Maximinus Daza, but before a Roman army can arrive, Hormizd defeats the Ghassanid army and kills their king. A Ghassanid force then ambushes Hormizd's small retinue while the latter is on a hunting trip, and the Sasanian king is mortally wounded. He dies after a 7-year reign.
- Hormizd is succeeded by his infant son Shapur II following the brief reign and murder of Adur Narseh.

=== By topic ===
==== Religion ====
- Pope Marcellus I is banished from Rome by Emperor Maxentius.
- April 18 – Eusebius succeeds Marcellus I as the 31st pope, but is himself banished on August 17 to Sicily (these events may have also taken place in 310).

== Births ==
- Shapur II (the Great), king of the Sassanid Empire (d. 379)

== Deaths ==
- January 16 – Marcellus I, bishop of Rome (b. 255)
- Adur Narseh, king of the Sassanid Empire
- Elias and companions, Christian martyrs
- Hormizd II, king of the Sassanid Empire
