= Ardashir II =

Shahanshah of the Sasanian Empire from 379 to 383

Ardashir II 𐭠𐭥𐭲𐭧𐭱𐭲𐭥
- King of Kings of Iranians and non-Iranians
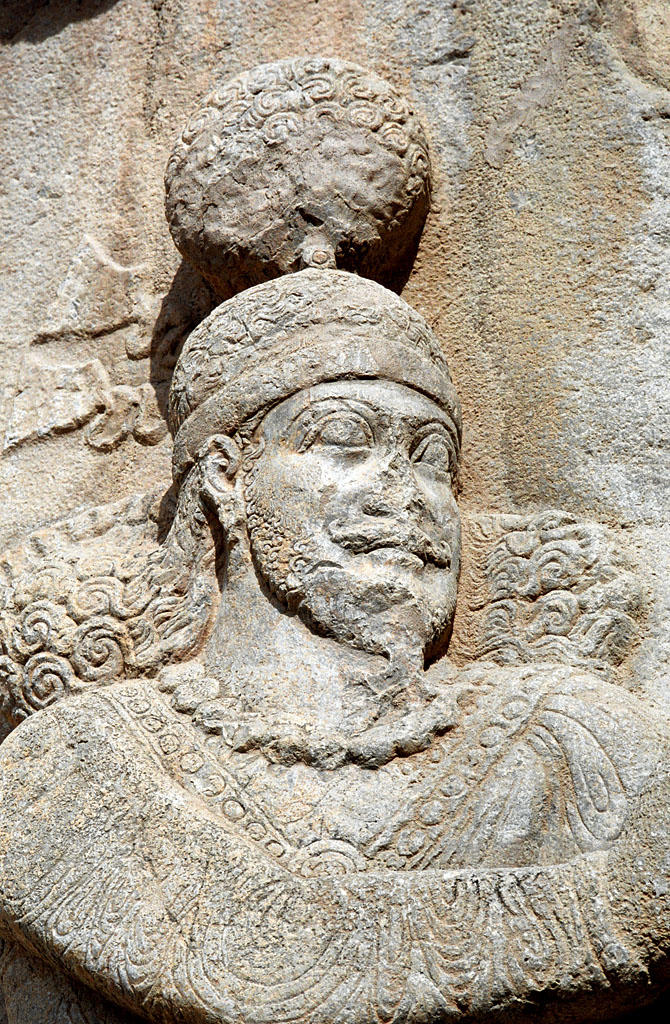
- Rock relief of Ardashir II in Taq-e Bostan

King of Adiabene
- Reign: 344–376
- Predecessor: Unknown
- Successor: Title abolished; Adiabene transformed into a province

Shahanshah of the Sasanian Empire
- Reign: 379–383
- Predecessor: Shapur II
- Successor: Shapur III
- Born: 309/10
- Died: 383
- House: House of Sasan
- Father: Hormizd II
- Religion: Zoroastrianism

Ardashir II (Middle Persian: 𐭠𐭥𐭲𐭧𐭱𐭲𐭥, romanized: Ardašīr), was the Sasanian King of Kings (shahanshah) of Iran from 379 to 383. He was the brother of his predecessor, Shapur II (r. 309–379), under whom he had served as vassal king of Adiabene, where he fought alongside his brother against the Romans. Ardashir II was appointed as his brother's successor to rule interimly till the latter's son Shapur III reached adulthood. Ardashir II's short reign was largely uneventful, with the Sasanians unsuccessfully trying to maintain rule over Armenia.

Ardashir II was seemingly a strong-willed character, and is known in some sources by the epithet of nikukar ("the beneficent").

== Name ==
Ardashir is the Middle Persian form of the Old Persian Ṛtaxšira (also spelled Artaxšaçā, meaning "whose reign is through truth"). The Latin variant of the name is Artaxerxes. Three kings of the Achaemenid Empire were known to have the same name.

== Background ==
Ardashir was the son of shah Hormizd II (r. 302–309), who was killed by the Iranian nobility whilst hunting. He was succeeded by Adur Narseh, who, after a brief reign which only lasted a few months, was also killed by the nobles, who then proceeded to blind the second, and imprison the third (Hormizd, who later managed to escape to the Roman Empire). Ardashir's infant half-brother Shapur II, who was only slightly older than him, was crowned as king by the nobles so that they could gain greater control of the empire, which they were able to do until Shapur II reached his majority at the age of 16.

Ardashir, before becoming king of the Sasanian Empire, was vassal king of Adiabene from 344 to 376. It is believed that during his tenure he took part in the defense of the Sasanian Empire with Shapur when it was invaded by the Roman Emperor Julian (r. 361–363). Ardashir is the last figure to be recorded as king of Adiabene, which implies that the kingdom was after his tenure transformed into a province (shahr), governed by a non-royal delegate (marzban or shahrab) of the Sasanian shah. In 379, Shapur II designated Ardashir as his successor, and made him vow to abdicate when Shapur's son, Shapur III reached adulthood. Due to the appointment and the extensive rule of Shapur II, certain Armenian authors incorrectly identified Ardashir as the son of Shapur II.

== Reign ==
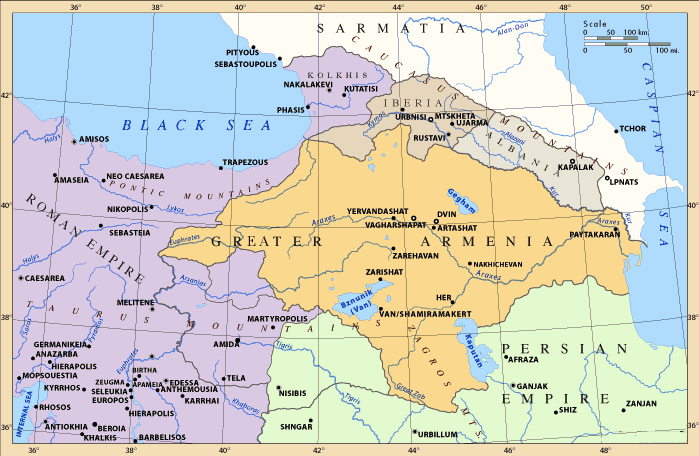
Map of Armenia and its surroundings

Armenia had been constantly the source of war between the Roman and Sasanian Empires. In 378/9, Shapur II had achieved Iranian hegemony over the country after its regent Manuel Mamikonian submitted to him. A force 10,000 of Iranian soldiers led by general Surena were dispatched to Armenia. Surena was given the title of marzban (margrave), which indicates that Armenia was now a Sasanian province. But this did not work for long. During the early reign of Ardashir II, a nobleman named Meruzhan Artsruni deliberately gave Manuel wrong information, informing him that commandant of the Iranian garrison desired to capture him. Enraged, Manuel fell upon the ten thousand Iranian soldiers stationed in Armenia and murdered them.

Ardashir responded by sending an army into Armenia, but Manuel defeated the invaders and killed their commander, Gumand Shapuh. A second Iranian force, led by Varaz, met the same fate as its predecessor. A third army, led by general Mrkhan, captured some Armenian territory before it too was massacred by Manuel and his forces. This new victory guaranteed Armenia seven years of peace. Ardashir was soon deposed or killed by the nobility, due to his continuation of Shapur II's policy of restricting the authority of nobles who increase their autonomy. Ardashr II was succeeded by Shapur III.

Ardashir was seemingly a strong-willed character, and is known in some sources by the epithet of nikukar ("the beneficent").

== Coins ==
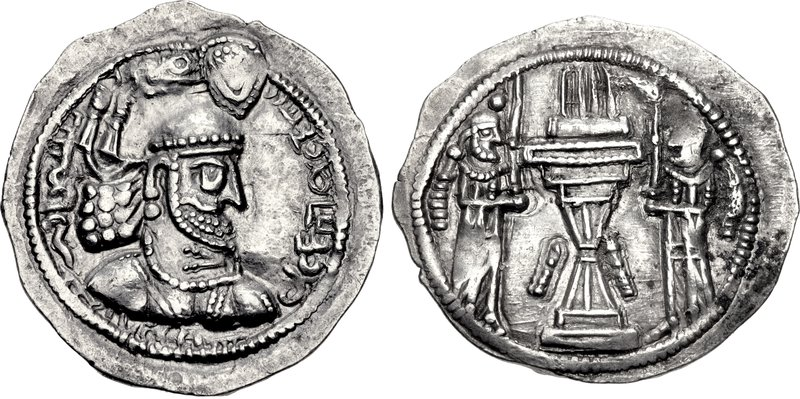
Drachma of Ardashir II

The coins minted under Ardashir imitates him wearing the same dome-shaped crown worn by the first Sasanian shah, Ardashir I (r. 224–242). The reverse shows the common depiction of two attendants surrounding a fire altar, but in some cases also shows the shah's head appearing from the fire, which may symbolize the royal xwarra ("glory"). The inscription of his coins are usually "Ardashir, king of kings of the Iranians" whilst rare instances of "and of non-Iranians" also being part of the inscription.

== Rock relief ==
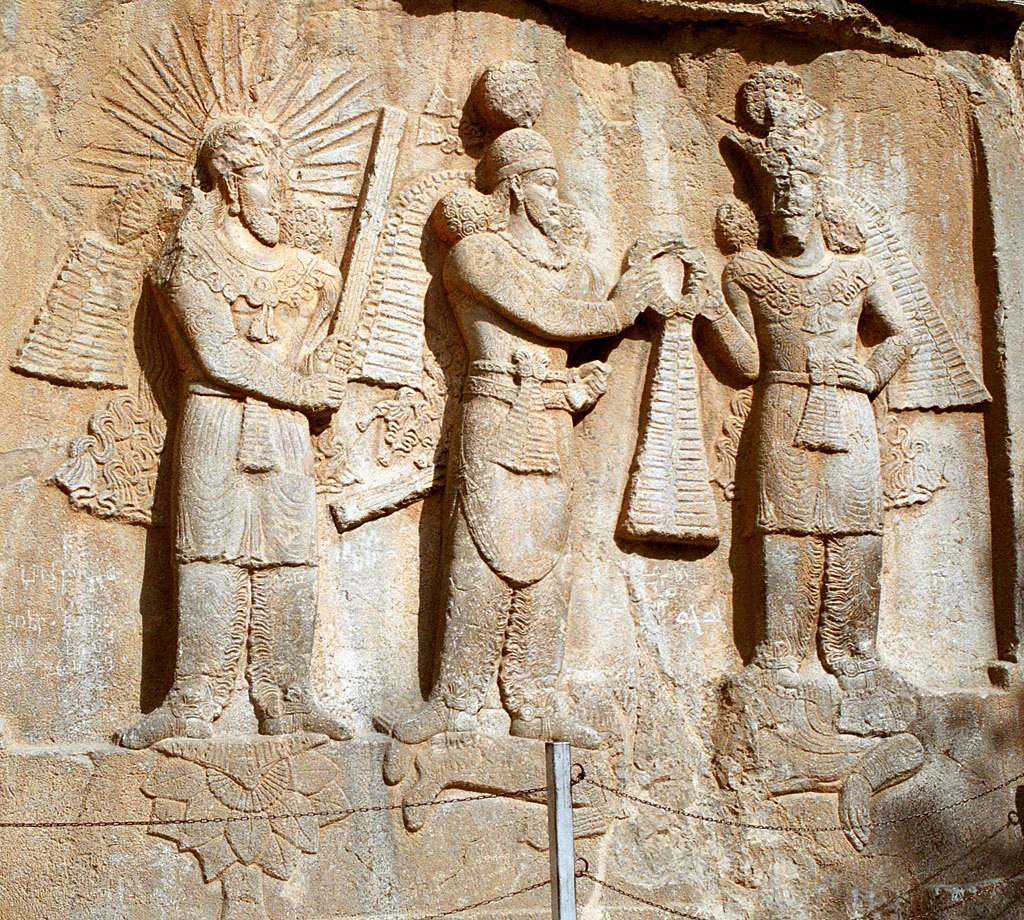
Rock relief at Taq-e Bostan of the investiture of Ardashir II, flanked by Mithra and Shapur II

Ardashir, like his forefathers, also had himself rock reliefs of himself created. However, instead of using the sites of Pars (present-day Fars province) as a place for this, he instead had it done in the Taq-e Bostan, near present-day Kermanshah). The relief shows three standing figures wearing regalia; Ardashir being in the middle, surrounded by two male figures. The figure to the right, who is giving the diadem to Ardashir originally used to recognized as the Zoroastrian supreme god Ahura Mazda, but is now agreed to be Shapur II due to the style of his crown.

The two shahs are standing on the body of a fallen Roman emperor, possibly the Roman emperor Julian, who invaded Iran in 363 and was killed west of the Sasanian capital of Ctesiphon. The figure standing to the far left, perceived by some to be the Zoroastrian prophet Zoroaster, is most likely the angelic divinity Mithra. He is wearing a crown embellished with twelve rays of the sun, whilst holding a raised barsom, thus sanctifying the investiture.

== Bibliography ==
=== Ancient works ===
- Faustus of Byzantium, History of the Armenians.

=== Modern works ===
- Bosworth, C. E., ed. (1999). The History of al-Ṭabarī, Volume V: The Sāsānids, the Byzantines, the Lakhmids, and Yemen. SUNY Series in Near Eastern Studies. Albany, New York: State University of New York Press. ISBN 978-0-7914-4355-2.
- Canepa, Matthew (2018). "Taq-e Bostan". In Nicholson, Oliver (ed.). The Oxford Dictionary of Late Antiquity. Oxford: Oxford University Press. ISBN 978-0-19-866277-8.
- Chaumont, M. L. (1986). "Armenia Iran ii. The pre-Islamic period". Encyclopædia Iranica, online edition, Vol. II, Fasc. 4. pp. 418–438.
- Daryaee, Touraj (2009). "Šāpur II". Encyclopædia Iranica, online edition.
- Grenet, Franz (2006). "Mithra ii. iconography in Iran and Central Asia". Encyclopædia Iranica, online edition.
- Lenski, Noel Emmanuel (2002). Failure of Empire: Valens and the Roman state in the fourth century A.D. University of California Press. ISBN 978-0-520-23332-4.
- Marciak, Michał (2017). Sophene, Gordyene, and Adiabene: Three Regna Minora of Northern Mesopotamia Between East and West. BRILL. ISBN 9789004350724.
- Pourshariati, Parvaneh (2008). Decline and Fall of the Sasanian Empire: The Sasanian-Parthian Confederacy and the Arab Conquest of Iran. London and New York: I.B. Tauris. ISBN 978-1-84511-645-3.
- Schmitt, R. (1986). "Artaxerxes". Encyclopædia Iranica, online edition, Vol. II, Fasc. 6. pp. 654–655.
- Shahbazi, A. Shapur (1986). "Ardašīr II". Encyclopædia Iranica, online edition, Vol. II, Fasc. 4. pp. 380–381.
- Shayegan, M. Rahim (2004). "Hormozd I". Encyclopædia Iranica, online edition, Vol. XII, Fasc. 5. pp. 462–464.
- Shahbazi, A. Shapur (2004). "Hormozd (2)". Encyclopædia Iranica, online edition, Vol. XII, Fasc. 5. pp. 461–462.
- Tafazzoli, Ahmad (1983). "Ādur Narseh". Encyclopædia Iranica, online edition, Vol. I, Fasc. 5. p. 477.
- Wiesehöfer, Joseph (1986). "Ardašīr I i. History". Encyclopædia Iranica, online edition, Vol. II, Fasc. 4. pp. 371–376.
- Wiesehöfer, Josef (2018). "Ardashir II". In Nicholson, Oliver (ed.). The Oxford Dictionary of Late Antiquity. Oxford: Oxford University Press. ISBN 978-0-19-866277-8.

Ardashir II Sasanian dynasty Born: c. 310 Died: 383
Preceded by Shapur II	King of Kings of Iran and non-Iran; 379–383	Succeeded by Shapur III
