= CCLV =

CCLV may refer to:

- 255 in Roman numerals
- 255 (number)
- Circus Circus Las Vegas
- Clark County, Las Vegas, the most populous county in the U.S. state of Nevada, home to Las Vegas
