= Ifra Hormizd =

Regent of the Sasanian Empire (r. 309–325)

Regent of the Sasanian Empire
- Regency: c. 309 AD–c. 325 AD
- Monarch: Shapur II
- Spouse: Hormizd II
- Issue: Adur Narseh; Shapur II
- House: House of Sasan
- Religion: Christianity

Ifra Hormizd (Modern Persian: ایفرا هرمز) or Faraya Ohrmazd (Modern Persian: فرایه هرمز) was a Sasanian noblewoman, spouse of Hormizd II and mother of Shapur II. She held the position of Regent of the Sasanian Empire during between 309 and 325.

Following Hormizd's death, and the crisis of succession that followed, the noblemen of the country decided to hand over power to the last child of Hormizd, who had not yet been born of Ifra. Thus, the crown was placed on Ifra's belly, and she ruled over the country with nobles from 309 until the adulthood of her son, Shapur, who was declared mature to rule himself at age 16 in 325.

== Etymology ==
There isn't much information about Ifra Hormizd's name, and only Jewish sources mentioned her name. She is mentioned in five stories in the Talmud. German scholar Theodor Nöldeke also found the name "Ifra" unclear. It may be related to the Persian word "Afiryon", translated as grace, and would thus be a title similar to "Her Grace".

== Life ==
The Nestorian Chronicle suggested that the father of Shapur II's mother was Jewish. According to a corresponding chronicle, Ifra Hormizd was converted to Christianity by bishop Shemon Bar Sabbae and this may have been one of the reasons for the execution of Shemon. Note that there was a period of persecution of Christians during the reign of Shapur II.

According to the Talmud, Ifra Hormizd sent a purse full of dinars to Rav Yosef bar Hiyya, and asked that it be used for a great mitzva. she also once sent period blood to Rava, seeking to convert to Judaism, while she was on her period, According to the Gemara (Niddah 20b), Ifra Hormiz, the mother of the Sasanian king Shapur II, consulted the Talmudic sage Rava regarding Jewish laws of menstrual purity (halakhot), as she was considering conversion to Judaism, Rava identified the sample sent by her as "blood of desire" (dam ḥimmud) by smelling it. Impressed by the accurate diagnosis, Ifra Hormiz praised the wisdom of Jewish scholars to her son. King Shapur II remained skeptical, saying Rava's success was merely a lucky guess. To test his ability further, Ifra Hormiz sent Rava sixty distinct blood samples—some ritually pure and others impure. Rava correctly identified the origin and status of each sample. The final sample sent to Rava was louse blood, which he did not recognize. According to the narrative, Rava was assisted by divine providence (siyata di-shmaya): unaware of the nature of the sample, he incidentally sent Ifra Hormiz a lice comb as a gift. Upon receiving it, she recognized that Rava had correctly identified the final sample and expressed admiration for the insight of the Jewish sages.

=== Regency ===
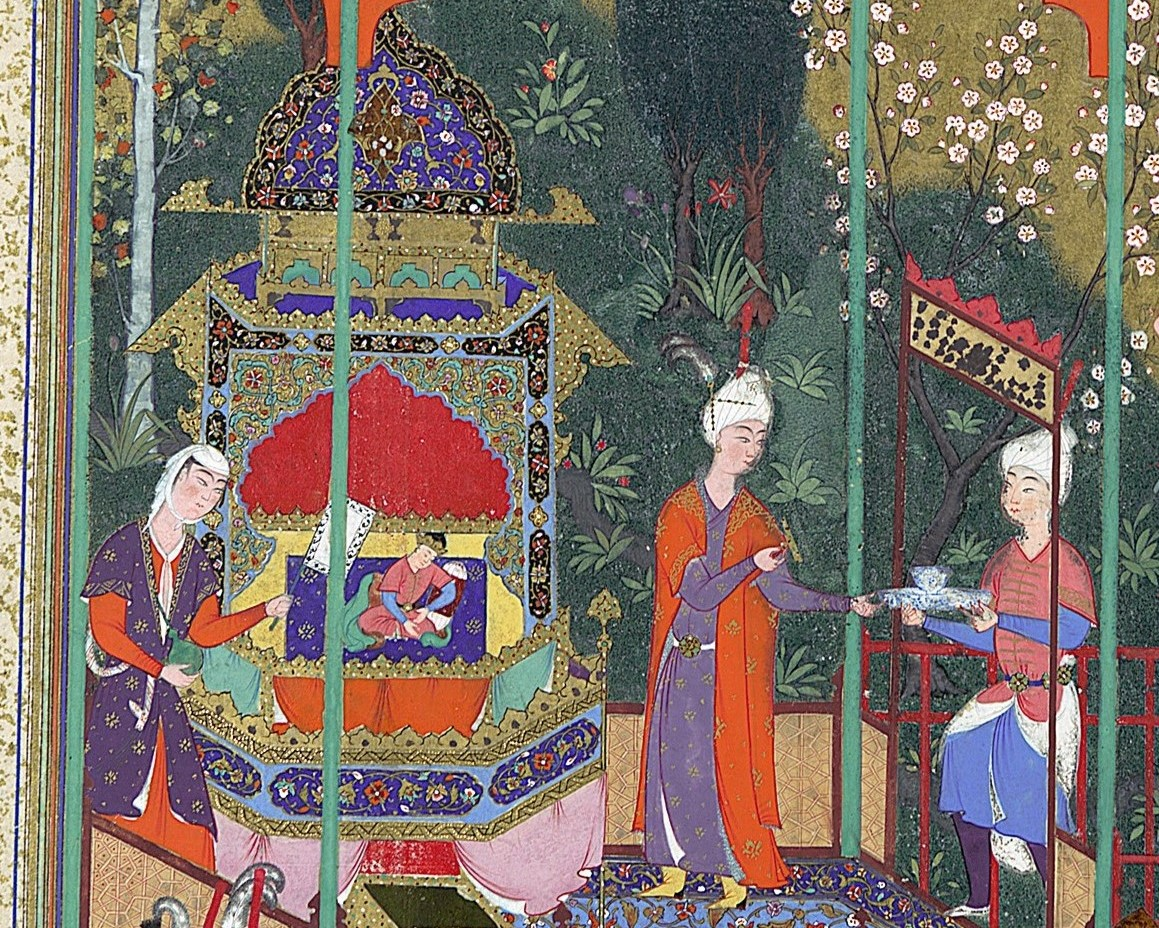
Coronation of Shapur II in childhood, Shahnameh of Shah Tahmasp, related to 1525-30

Following the death of Hormizd II (r. 302–309), their son Adur Narseh (r. 309–309) succeeded him, but after a while he was deposed and killed by noblemen. Nobles then blinded Hormizd's second son and his third son who was named Hormizd, was imprisoned. He escaped the prison shortly afterwards and took refuge in the Roman Empire. Therefore, the throne of the Sasanian Empire was considered for the unborn son of Hormizd by his wife Ifra Hormizd, who later became Shapur II (r. 309–379).

== See also ==
- List of Iranian women royalty

== Sources ==
- Daryaee, Touraj (2009). "Šāpur II". Encyclopaedia Iranica.
- Neusner, Jacob (1969). A History of the Jews in Babylonia, Part 4. The Age of Shapur II. Brill. ISBN 9789004021471.
- Tafazzoli, Ahmad (1983). "Ādur Narseh". Encyclopaedia Iranica, Vol. I, Fasc. 5. p. 477.
- Al-Tabari, Abu Ja'far Muhammad ibn Jarir (1991). Yar-Shater, Ehsan (ed.). The History of al-Ṭabarī, Volume V: The Sasanids, the Byzantines, the Lakhmids, and Yemen. Trans. Clifford Edmund Bosworth. Albany, NY: State University of New York Press. ISBN 0-7914-0493-5.
- Shahbazi, A. Shapur (2004). "Hormizd (2)". Encyclopaedia Iranica, Vol. XII, Fasc. 5. pp. 461–462.
- Daryaee, Touraj (2014). Sasanian Persia: The Rise and Fall of an Empire. I.B.Tauris. pp. 1–240. ISBN 978-0-85771-666-8.
