= Tigranes (son of Khosrov IV of Armenia) =

Tigranes (Armenian: Տիգրան) was an Armenian prince of the Arsacid dynasty of Armenia who lived in the second half of the 4th century and possibly first half of the 5th century.

According to modern genealogies, Tigranes was a son born to the Armenian monarchs Khosrov IV and Zruanduxt, while his brother was Arsaces. The father of Tigranes, Khosrov IV was an Arsacid prince who was the first Armenian monarch to serve as a client king of Eastern Armenia under Sassanid rule who reigned from 387 until 389. His mother Zruanduxt, was a Sassanid princess from Persia who was the sister of the Sassanid King Shapur III who reigned from 383 until 388.

Tigranes was named in honor of his ancestor Tigranes VII, also known as Tiran and he was also named in honor of the monarchs named Tigranes of the Artaxiad dynasty. The name Tigranes, was the most common royal name in the Artaxiad dynasty and was among the most ancient names of the kings of Armenia. He was born at an unknown date in his father's kingship and raised in Eastern Armenia. It is unknown whether he became a Christian in faith or a follower of the religion of Zoroastrianism.

In 389 the Sassanid King Bahram IV, dethroned Khosrov IV and placed him in confinement in Ctesiphon. Bahram IV was unsatisfied with Khosrov IV. Bahram IV considered Khosrov IV, as being too assertive in his royal authority as a governing client monarch and did various acts in his kingship without consultation from the Sassanid dynasty. Bahram IV in 389 replaced Khosrov IV, with his brother Vramshapuh as Sassanid Client King of Arsacid Armenia. After this moment, the fate of Zruanduxt, Tigranes and Arsaces is unknown.

== Sources ==
- Faustus of Byzantium, History of the Armenians, 5th century
- Toumanoff, Cyril (1976). Manuel de Généalogie et de Chronologie pour l'Histoire de la Caucasie Chrétienne (Arménie-Géorgie-Albanie) (in French). Rome: Edizioni Aquila. OCLC 4780662.
- R.G. Hovannisian, The Armenian People from Ancient to Modern Times, Volume 1: The Dynastic Periods: From Antiquity to the Fourteenth Century, Palgrave Macmillan, 2004
- V.M. Kurkjian, A History of Armenia, Indo-European Publishing, 2008
