= Hormizd II =

Shahanshah of the Sasanian Empire from 303 to 309

Hormizd II 𐭠𐭥𐭧𐭥𐭬𐭦𐭣
- King of Kings of Iranians and non-Iranians
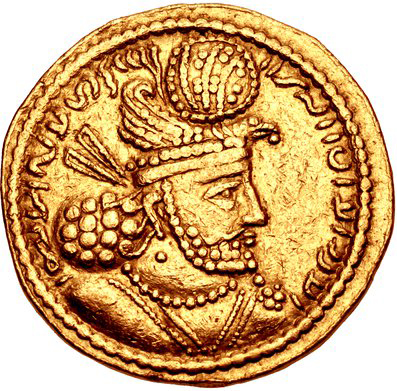
- Gold dinar of Hormizd II

Shahanshah of the Sasanian Empire
- Reign: 303–309
- Predecessor: Narseh
- Successor: Adur Narseh
- Died: 309
- Spouse: Ifra Hormizd
- Issue: See below
- House: House of Sasan
- Father: Narseh
- Mother: Shapurdukhtak
- Religion: Zoroastrianism

Hormizd II (also spelled Hormozd or Ohrmazd; Middle Persian: 𐭠𐭥𐭧𐭥𐭬𐭦𐭣) was king (shah) of the Sasanian Empire. He ruled for six years and five months, from 303 to 309. He was a son and successor of Narseh (r. 293–303).

During his reign, the Kingdom of Armenia under Tiridates III adopted Christianity as its official religion, thus leaving its ancient Zoroastrian heritage that it shared with Sasanian Iran. Hormizd II's reign was also marked by internal turmoil, which he successfully managed to deal with. Hormizd II was also successful in his efforts in the west, defeating and killing the Ghassanid king in Syria. His reign was, however, cut short by the intrigues of the Iranian nobility, who killed him in a secluded place.

He was succeeded by his son Adur Narseh, who after a few months of reigning was also killed by the nobility. They instead installed Hormizd II's infant son Shapur II on the throne.

== Etymology ==
The name of Hormizd (also spelled Ōhrmazd, Hormozd) is the Middle Persian version of the name of the supreme deity in Zoroastrianism, known in Avestan as Ahura Mazda. The Old Persian equivalent is Auramazdā, while the Greek transliteration is Hormisdas. The name is attested in Armenian as Ormizd and in Georgian as Urmizd.

== Life ==
=== Background ===
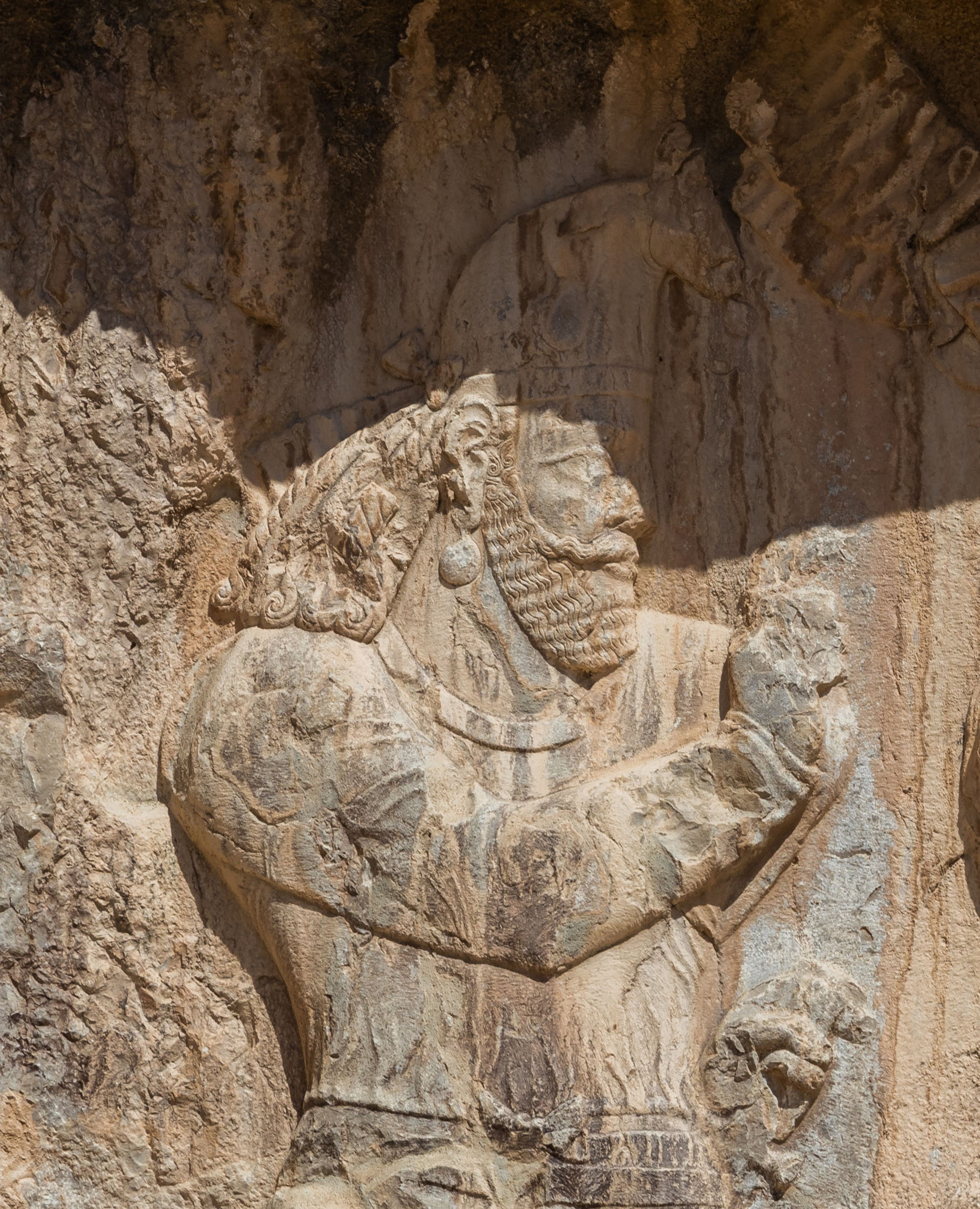
Relief of Hormizd II as a prince

When Hormizd's father Narseh ascended the throne in 293, he had an investiture relief made in Naqsh-e Rostam, where he is depicted as receiving the ring of kingship from a female figure that is frequently assumed to be the goddess Anahita. However, some scholars have suggested that this may be his wife and Hormizd's mother, Shapurdukhtak. The figure standing behind Narseh is most likely Hormizd, due to his cap being the form of that of an animal protome, which was typically worn by Sasanian heirs. Hormizd most likely did not take part in his father's war against the Roman Empire, which ended disastrously for the Sasanians, with Narseh's wife and some of his offspring being captured, forcing him to surrender a handful provinces in Armenia and Mesopotamia in order to have his family members handed back to him. Hormizd may have been same person as Hormizd II Kushanshah, a Sasanian prince who briefly ruled the Kushano-Sasanian Kingdom from 300 to 303. They both minted coins where they were depicted with a winged crown, whilst on the reverse, which usually shows the traditional fire altar flanked by two attendants, also shows a head emerging from the fire, a typical Kushano-Sasanian design which first appears on Sasanian coins during the reign of Hormizd II.

=== Reign ===
In 303, Hormizd II ascended the throne, assuming a crown whose features resembled that of the same used by the early Sasanian rulers, such as Bahram II (r. 274–293). Not much is known about the reign of Hormizd; he supposedly started out as a cruel ruler but then became benevolent.

This change of behaviour is described by al-Tabari;

"The people had been in awe of him, and had experienced harshness and severity [from him]. But he told them that he had been fully aware of their fears over his severity and strong rule, and informed them that he had exchanged the roughness and harshness in his nature for mildness and clemency. He then ruled them in the most considerate fashion and behaved in the most equitable manner possible. He was eager to succor and revive the weak, to render the land prosperous and flourishing, and to spread justice among the subjects."

— History of the Prophets and Kings, volume 5

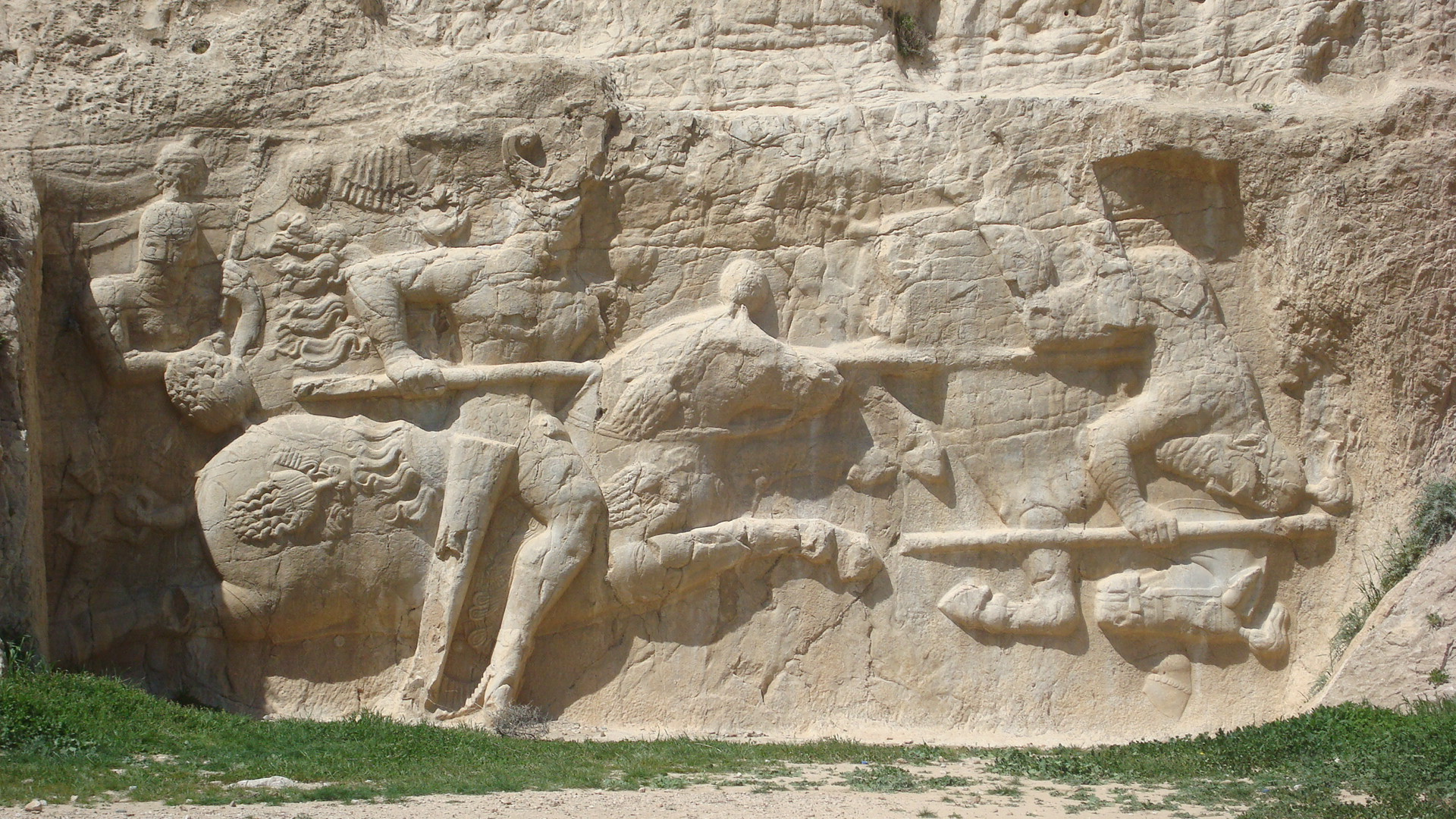
Relief of Hormizd II impaling his enemy at Naqsh-e Rostam

However, he persecuted the Manicheans, who had lived peacefully in the reign of his father; Hormizd reportedly founded the rural district of Kurang (or Wahisht-Hormozd) near Izeh in the Khuzistan province. He gave his daughter Hormizddukht in marriage to a Mamikonian prince named Vahan as part of an effort to improve Sasanian relations with Armenia, which had recently under Tiridates III of Armenia declared Christianity as its state religion.

Hormizd's rock relief at Naqsh-e Rostam in the Pars province (present-day Fars) indicates that there was internal turmoil during his reign. He is depicted on horseback, impaling an enemy whose helmet bears the family signature of Papak, a high-ranking nobleman who served as the bitakhsh (viceroy) of Albania during the reign of Bahram II and Narseh. During his last years Hormizd pursued hostilities against the Ghassanid king, demanding tribute and raiding Ghassanid domains in Syria. The Ghassanid king requested reinforcements from the Roman emperor, but was killed before they arrived. Hormizd died in 309, reportedly ambushed by Ghassanid troops whilst he was hunting in the desert. He was more likely killed in a secluded place by the Iranian nobility, who afterwards sought to get rid of his sons as well.

According to the 11th-century Chronicle of Seert, Hormizd declared war against the Romans in order to avenge the defeat of his father, whilst the Chronicle of Arbela states that when the Roman emperor started persecuting his Christian subjects, Hormizd raised a great army, invaded the Roman domains and raided many cities. The credibility of the two sources are doubtful, with the events not being reported in other sources. According to the Iranologist Alireza Shapour Shahbazi, "one may only surmise that it is probably a reflection of Hormozd's alleged raid into Syria."

== Succession ==
After Hormizd's death, he was succeeded by his eldest son Adur Narseh, who, after a brief reign which lasted few months, was killed by some of the nobles of the empire. They then blinded the second, and imprisoned the third (Hormizd, who afterwards escaped to the Roman Empire). The throne was reserved for the unborn child of Hormizd II's wife Ifra Hormizd, which was Shapur II. Shapur II was reportedly the only king in history to be crowned in utero, as the legend claims that the crown was placed upon his mother's womb while she was pregnant. However, according to Shahbazi, it is unlikely that Shapur was crowned as king while still in his mother's womb, since the nobles could not have known of his sex at that time. He further states that Shapur was born forty days after his father's death, and that the nobles killed Adur Narseh and crowned Shapur II in order to gain greater control of the empire, which they were able to do until Shapur II reached his majority at the age of 16.

== Offspring ==
Hormizd II was one of the Sasanian kings with the most children, which he had from his wife Ifra-Hormizd, and several other wives and concubines:

- Prince Adur Narseh (3rd century – 309), the ninth king of the Sasanian Empire.
- Prince Shapur II (309–379), the tenth king of the Sasanian Empire.
- Prince Adurfrazgird (??? – 4th century), governor of southern Arbayistan.
- Prince Zamasp (??? – 4th century), governor of northern Arbayistan.
- Prince Shapur Sakanshah (??? – 4th century), governor of Sakastan.
- Prince Hormizd (??? – 4th century), imprisoned by the Iranian nobility and later defected to the Roman Empire.
- Prince Ardashir II (309–383), the eleventh king of the Sasanian Empire.
- Prince Narseh (??? – 4th century), briefly occupied the Armenian throne in the mid-330s.
- Princess Hormizddukht (??? – 4th century), married the Mamikonian prince Vahan.

== Sources ==
- Al-Tabari, Abu Ja'far Muhammad ibn Jarir (1985–2007). Ehsan Yar-Shater (ed.). The History of Al-Ṭabarī. Vol. 40 vols. Albany, NY: State University of New York Press.
- Brunner, C. J. (1983). "Ādurfrāzgird". Encyclopaedia Iranica, Vol. I, Fasc. 5. p. 478.
- Daryaee, Touraj (2009). "Šāpur II". Encyclopaedia Iranica.
- Daryaee, Touraj (2014). Sasanian Persia: The Rise and Fall of an Empire. I.B.Tauris. pp. 1–240. ISBN 978-0-85771-666-8.
- Kia, Mehrdad (2016). The Persian Empire: A Historical Encyclopedia [2 volumes]: A Historical Encyclopedia. ABC-CLIO. ISBN 978-1-61069-391-2.
- Lenski, Noel (2007). The Cambridge Companion to the Age of Constantine. Cambridge University Press. ISBN 978-1-139-00084-0.
- Pourshariati, Parvaneh (2008). Decline and Fall of the Sasanian Empire: The Sasanian-Parthian Confederacy and the Arab Conquest of Iran. London and New York: I.B. Tauris. ISBN 978-1-84511-645-3.
- Rapp, Stephen H. Jr (2014). The Sasanian World through Georgian Eyes: Caucasia and the Iranian Commonwealth in Late Antique Georgian Literature. Routledge. ISBN 978-1-4724-2552-2.
- Rezakhani, Khodadad (2017). ReOrienting the Sasanians: East Iran in Late Antiquity. Edinburgh University Press. pp. 1–256. ISBN 978-1-4744-0030-5.
- Schmitt, R.; Bailey, H. W. (1986). "ARMENIA AND IRAN iv. Iranian influences in Armenian Language". Encyclopaedia Iranica, Vol. II, Fasc. 4-5. pp. 445–465.
- Shahbazi, A. Shapur (2005). "SASANIAN DYNASTY". Encyclopaedia Iranica, Online Edition.
- Shahbazi, A. Shapur (2004a). "Hormozd II". Encyclopaedia Iranica, Vol. XII, Fasc. 5. pp. 464–465.
- Shahbazi, A. Shapur (2004b). "Hormozd (2)". Encyclopaedia Iranica, Vol. XII, Fasc. 5. pp. 461–462.
- Shayegan, M. Rahim (2004). "Hormozd I". Encyclopaedia Iranica, Vol. XII, Fasc. 5. pp. 462–464.
- Tafazzoli, Ahmad (1983). "Ādur Narseh". Encyclopaedia Iranica, Vol. I, Fasc. 5. p. 477.
- Vevaina, Yuhan; Canepa, Matthew (2018). "Ohrmazd". In Nicholson, Oliver (ed.). The Oxford Dictionary of Late Antiquity. Oxford: Oxford University Press. ISBN 978-0-19-866277-8.
- Weber, Ursula (2016). "Narseh". Encyclopaedia Iranica.
- Wiesehöfer, Josef (2001). Ancient Persia. Translated by Azodi, Azizeh. I.B. Tauris. ISBN 978-1-86064-675-1.

Hormizd II Sasanian dynasty Died: 309
Preceded by Narseh	King of Kings of Iran and non-Iran; 303–309	Succeeded by Adur Narseh
