= Zruanduxt =

Zruanduxt was a Sasanian princess from Persia who lived in the 4th century. She became queen consort to King Khosrov IV of Armenia.

== Background ==
Zruanduxt was the daughter of the Sasanian King Shapur II who reigned from 309 until 379 and was the father of the Sasanian King Shapur III who reigned from 383 until 388 by a mother whose name is unknown. Zruanduxt was born and raised in Ctesiphon, the capital of the Sasanian Empire. Little is known on her life prior to marrying the King Khosrov IV of Armenia.

== Partition ==
In 387, from the Sasanian invasions of Armenia, led the Roman emperor Theodosius I and the Sasanian King Shapur III to negotiate into a treaty called the Peace of Acilisene. This led the whole Roman Client Armenian Kingdom to be partitioned into two empires: Western Armenia to be under Roman rule and Eastern Armenia to be under Sasanian rule. Later in 387, the last Roman Client Armenian King Arsaces III (Arshak III) who ruled in Western Armenia died leaving no heir. Western Armenia was annexed and became a province of the Byzantine Empire.

Armenians that lived in Western Armenia moved into Eastern Armenia which included many of the Nakharars. The Armenians that lived under Sasanian rule, requested to Shapur III from him an Arsacid King. Shapur III delighted from the request of the Armenians and with their consent appointed the Arsacid prince Khosrov IV as King of Armenia. After the appointment of Khosrov IV, Shapur III put a crown on the head of the youth.

== Marriage ==
As a sign to extend his courtesies to Sasanian Armenia, Shapur III gave his sister Zruanduxt to Khosrov IV to marry as his wife. Through marriage Zruanduxt became a Queen consort, a relation to the ruling Arsacid dynasty of Armenia and a powerful, influential woman in Armenian society. Shapur III gave to his sister with Khosrov IV a large army to protect Armenia and gave Khosrov IV a tutor called Zik.

Zruanduxt had married a King Client who was a Christian in faith, as she was a follower of the Zoroastrianism, a faith that was the official state religion of the Sasanian Empire. It's unknown whether she became a Christian in faith. Little is known on her relationship with Khosrov IV. According to modern genealogies, Zruanduxt and Khosrov IV were the parents of two sons: Tigranes and Arsaces.

== Replacements ==
The goodwill that existed between Khosrov IV and Shapur III didn't last, as in 388 Shapur III died. Shapur III was succeeded by his son Bahram IV, who was Zruanduxt's nephew. Sometime in 389 Bahram IV, dethroned Khosrov IV and placed him in confinement in Ctesiphon. Bahram IV considered Khosrov IV had shown too great assertiveness of his royal authority. As Bahram IV was unsatisfied with Khosrov IV, he did various acts in his kingship without consultation from the Sasanian dynasty.

Bahram IV in 389 replaced Khosrov IV, with his brother Vramshapuh as Sasanian Client King of Arsacid Armenia. The fate of Zruanduxt and their two sons after this moment is unknown.

== Sources ==
- Faustus of Byzantium, History of the Armenians, 5th century
- Toumanoff, Cyril (1976). Manuel de Généalogie et de Chronologie pour l'Histoire de la Caucasie Chrétienne (Arménie-Géorgie-Albanie) (in French). Rome: Edizioni Aquila. OCLC 4780662.
- R.G. Hovannisian, The Armenian People From Ancient to Modern Times, Volume I: The Dynastic Periods: From Antiquity to the Fourteenth Century, Palgrave Macmillan, 2004
- V.M. Kurkjian, A History of Armenia, Indo-European Publishing, 2008
- Coinage and information on Sasanian Kings
