= Adur Narseh =

Shahanshah of the Sasanian Empire in 309 CE

- King of Kings of Iranians and non-Iranians

Shahanshah of the Sasanian Empire
- Reign: 309
- Predecessor: Hormizd II
- Successor: Shapur II
- Died: 309
- House: House of Sasan
- Father: Hormizd II
- Mother: Ifra Hormizd
- Religion: Zoroastrianism

Adur Narseh was the ninth Sasanian King of Kings of Iran briefly in 309. Following his father's death, the nobles and Zoroastrian clergy saw an opportunity to gain influence within the Empire. Thus, they murdered Adur Narseh, blinded one of his brothers and forced another brother (Hormizd) to flee. He was succeeded by his infant brother Shapur II.

Adur Narseh is only mentioned in some Greek sources, while oriental sources make no mention of him, and none of his coins have yet been found. The credibility of these Greek sources regarding Adur Narseh is questioned by Nikolaus Schindel, who believes that Adur Narseh probably never ruled.

== Sources ==
- Pourshariati, Parvaneh (2008). Decline and Fall of the Sasanian Empire: The Sasanian-Parthian Confederacy and the Arab Conquest of Iran. London and New York: I.B. Tauris. ISBN 978-1-84511-645-3.
- Schindel, Nikolaus (2013). "Sasanian Coinage". In Potts, Daniel T. (ed.). The Oxford Handbook of Ancient Iran. Oxford University Press. ISBN 978-0199733309.
- Shahbazi, A. Shapur (2005). "Sasanian dynasty". Encyclopaedia Iranica, Online Edition.
- Tafazzoli, Ahmad (1983). "ĀDUR NARSEH". Encyclopaedia Iranica, Vol. I, Fasc. 5. p. 477.

Adur Narseh Sasanian dynasty Died: 309
Preceded by Hormizd II	King of Kings of Iran and non-Iran; 309	Succeeded by Shapur II
