= 255 =

255 in various calendars
- Gregorian calendar: 255; CCLV
- Ab urbe condita: 1008
- Assyrian calendar: 5005
- Balinese saka calendar: 176–177
- Bengali calendar: −339 – −338
- Berber calendar: 1205
- Buddhist calendar: 799
- Burmese calendar: −383
- Byzantine calendar: 5763–5764
- Chinese calendar: 甲戌年 (Wood Dog); 2952 or 2745 — to — 乙亥年 (Wood Pig); 2953 or 2746
- Coptic calendar: −29 – −28
- Discordian calendar: 1421
- Ethiopian calendar: 247–248
- Hebrew calendar: 4015–4016
- Hindu calendars
- Vikram Samvat: 311–312
- Shaka Samvat: 176–177
- Kali Yuga: 3355–3356
- Holocene calendar: 10255
- Iranian calendar: 367 BP – 366 BP
- Islamic calendar: 378 BH – 377 BH
- Javanese calendar: 134–135
- Julian calendar: 255; CCLV
- Korean calendar: 2588
- Minguo calendar: 1657 before ROC 民前1657年
- Nanakshahi calendar: −1213
- Seleucid era: 566/567 AG
- Thai solar calendar: 797–798
- Tibetan calendar: ཤིང་ཕོ་ཁྱི་ལོ་ (male Wood-Dog); 381 or 0 or −772 — to — ཤིང་མོ་ཕག་ལོ་ (female Wood-Boar); 382 or 1 or −771

Year 255 (CCLV) was a common year starting on Monday of the Julian calendar. At the time, it was known in Rome as the Year of the Consulship of Valerianus and Gallienus (or, less frequently, year 1008 Ab urbe condita). The denomination 255 for this year has been used since the early medieval period, when the Anno Domini calendar era became the prevalent method in Europe for naming years.

== Events ==
=== By place ===
==== China ====
- Sima Shi quells Guanqiu Jian and Wen Qin's rebellion.
- March 23 – Sima Shi passes away.
- Sima Zhao, Sima Shi's younger brother, inherits his brother's authority.

=== By topic ===
==== Science ====
- Ma Jun, Chinese mechanical engineer from Cao Wei, invents the south-pointing chariot, a path-finding directional compass vehicle that uses a differential gear, not magnetics.

== Births ==
- January 6 – Marcellus I, bishop of Rome (d. 309)
- Dorotheus of Tyre, Syrian bishop and martyr (d. 362)
- Zhang Gui, Chinese governor of the Jin Dynasty (d. 314)
- Zuo Fen, Chinese poet of the Western Jin Dynasty (d. 300)
- Saint Helena, Roman empress who was the reputed discoverer of Christ’s cross and mother of Emperor Constantine (d. 318)

== Deaths ==
- February 23 – Guo Huai (or Boji), Chinese general
- March 16 – Guanqiu Jian, Chinese general and politician
- March 23 – Sima Shi, Chinese general and regent (b. 208)
- Fu Gu (or Lanshi), Chinese official and politician (b. 209)
- Liu Zan (or Zhengming), Chinese general (b. 183)
- Sun Luyu (or Xiaohu), Chinese princess
