= Shapur II =

Shahanshah of the Sasanian Empire from 309 to 379

Shapur II the Great 𐭱𐭧𐭯𐭥𐭧𐭥𐭩
- King of Kings of Iranians and non-Iranians
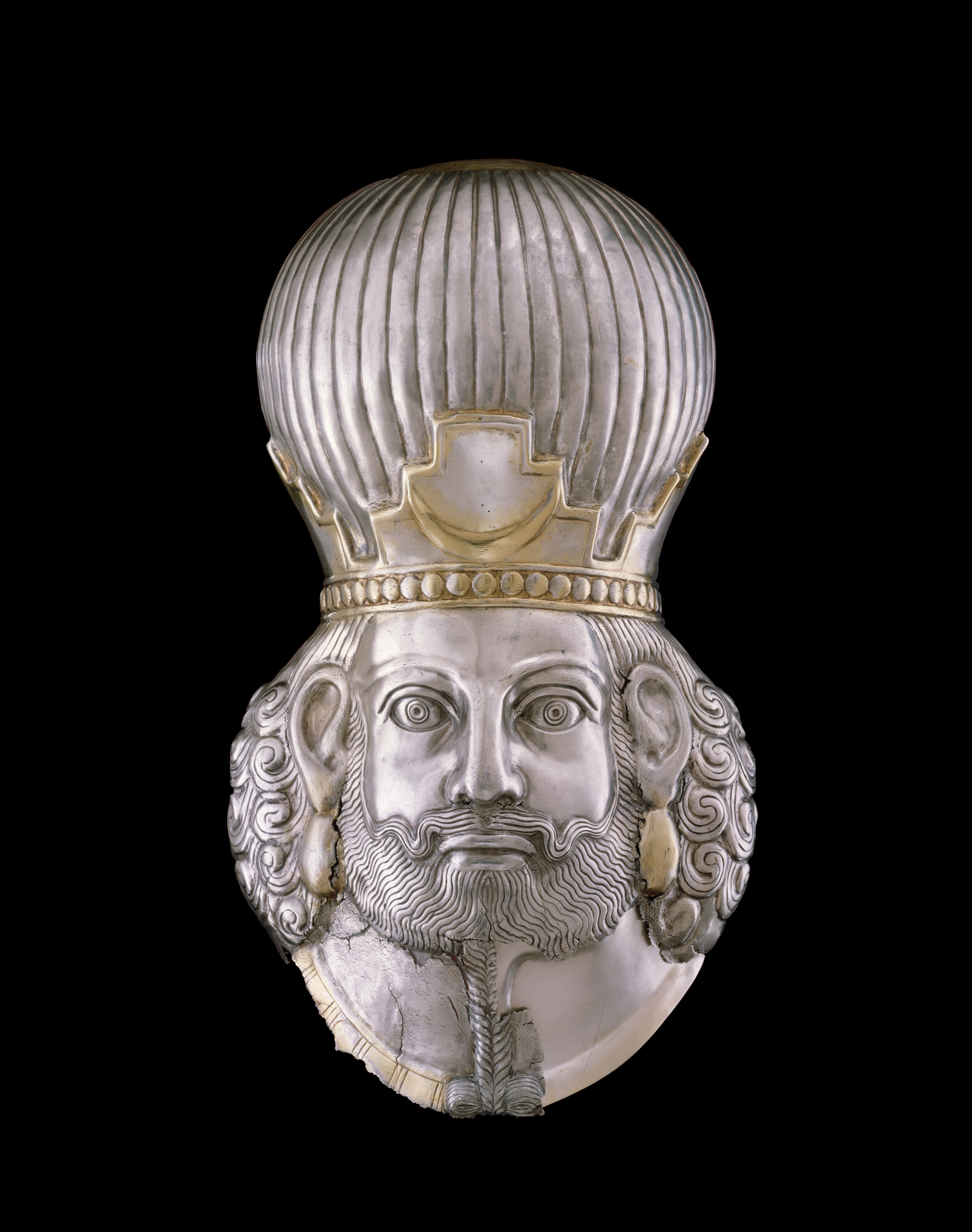
- Possible bust of Shapur II

Shahanshah of the Sasanian Empire
- Reign: 309 – 379
- Predecessor: Adur Narseh
- Successor: Ardashir II
- Regent: Ifra Hormizd (309‍–‍325)
- Born: 309
- Died: 379 (aged 70)
- Issue: Shapur III; Zurvandukht
- House: House of Sasan
- Father: Hormizd II
- Mother: Ifra Hormizd
- Religion: Zoroastrianism (possibly Zurvanism)

Shapur II (Middle Persian: 𐭱𐭧𐭯𐭥𐭧𐭥𐭩 Šābuhr, 309–379), also known as Shapur II the Great, was the tenth King of Kings (Shahanshah) of the Sasanian Empire. He took the title at birth and held it until his death at age 70, making him the longest-reigning monarch in Sasanian history. He was the son of Hormizd II (r. 302–309).

His reign saw the military resurgence of the country and the expansion of its territory, which marked the start of the first Sasanian golden era. Thus, along with Shapur I, Kavad I and Khosrow I, he is regarded as one of the most illustrious Sasanian kings. His three direct successors, on the other hand, were less successful. At the age of 16, he launched enormously successful military campaigns against Arab insurrections and tribes.

Shapur II pursued a harsh religious policy. Under his reign, the collection of the Avesta, the sacred texts of Zoroastrianism, was completed, heresy and apostasy were punished, and Christians were persecuted. The latter was a reaction against the Christianization of the Roman Empire by Constantine the Great. At the time of Shapur's death, the Sasanian Empire was stronger than ever, with its enemies to the east pacified and Armenia under Sasanian control.

== Etymology ==
Shapur was a popular name in Sasanian Iran, being used by three Sasanian monarchs and other notables of the Sasanian era. Derived from Old Iranian *xšayaθiya.puθra 'son of a king', it must initially have been a title, which became—at least in the late 2nd century CE—a personal name. It appears in the list of Arsacid kings in some Arabic-Persian sources; however, this is anachronistic. Shapur is rendered variously in other languages: Greek Sapur, Sabour and Sapuris; Latin Sapores and Sapor; Arabic Sābur and Šābur; New Persian Šāpur, Šāhpur, Šahfur.

== Accession ==
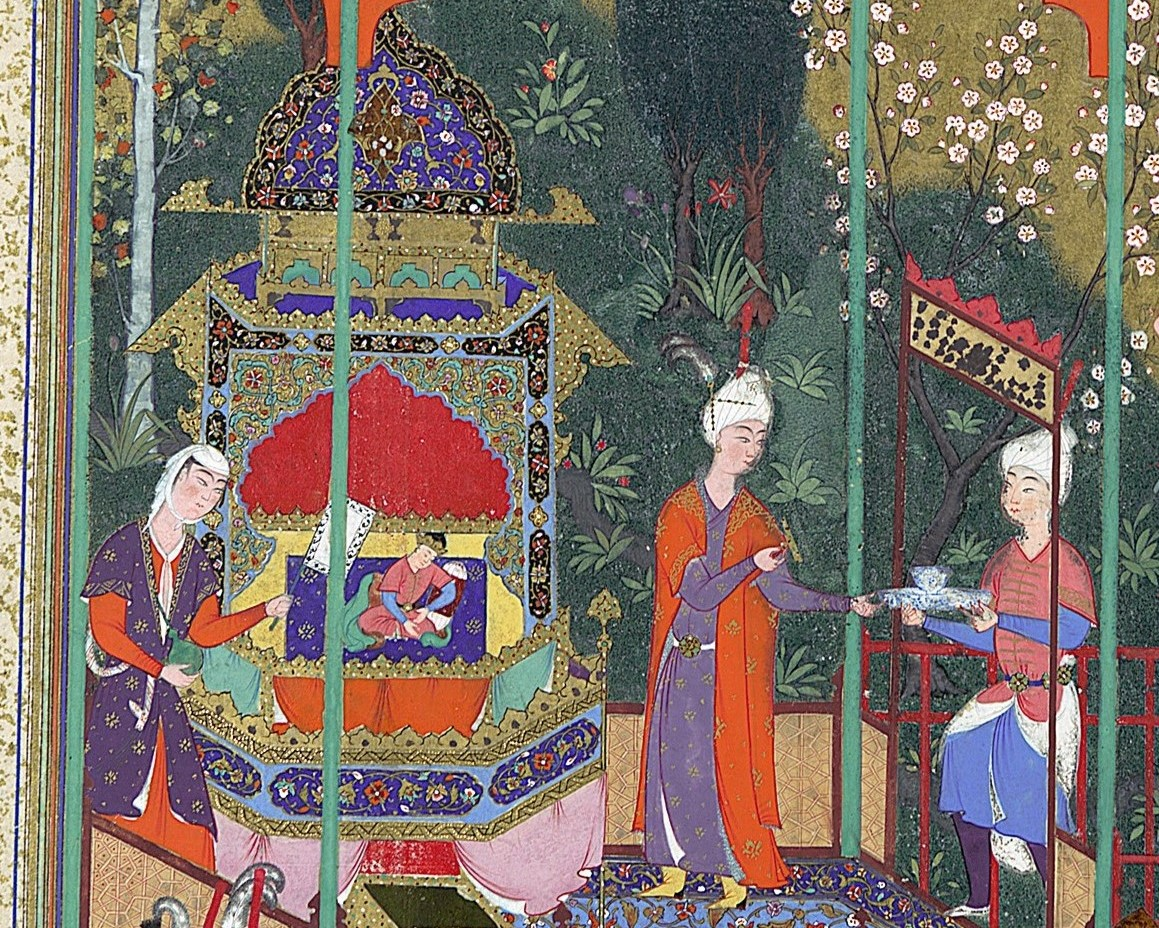
"The Coronation of the Infant Shapur II", from the Shahnameh of Shah Tahmasp, c. 1525–1530

When Hormizd II died in 309, he was succeeded by his son Adur Narseh, who, after a brief reign which lasted few months, was killed by some of the nobles of the empire. They then blinded Hormizd's second son, and imprisoned the third (Hormizd, who afterwards escaped to the Roman Empire). The throne was reserved for another one of Hormizd II's children, Shapur II; some sources say that Shapur was born forty days after his father's death while others say that he was infant at the time. A legend exists that Shapur was crowned while still unborn, with the crown being placed upon his pregnant mother's womb. This story was known to Western historians such as Agathias (6th century), who writes that the magi had prophesied that the child would be a boy. Modern historians C. E. Bosworth and Alireza Shapour Shahbazi consider this story to be fictional. The sex of the infant could not have been known before Shapur's birth, writes Bosworth. The crowning of the infant Shapur after the elimination of his older brothers was a means for the nobility and priesthood to gain greater control of the empire. They maintained their control until 325, when Shapur reached maturity at the age of sixteen.

== War with the Arabs (325) ==
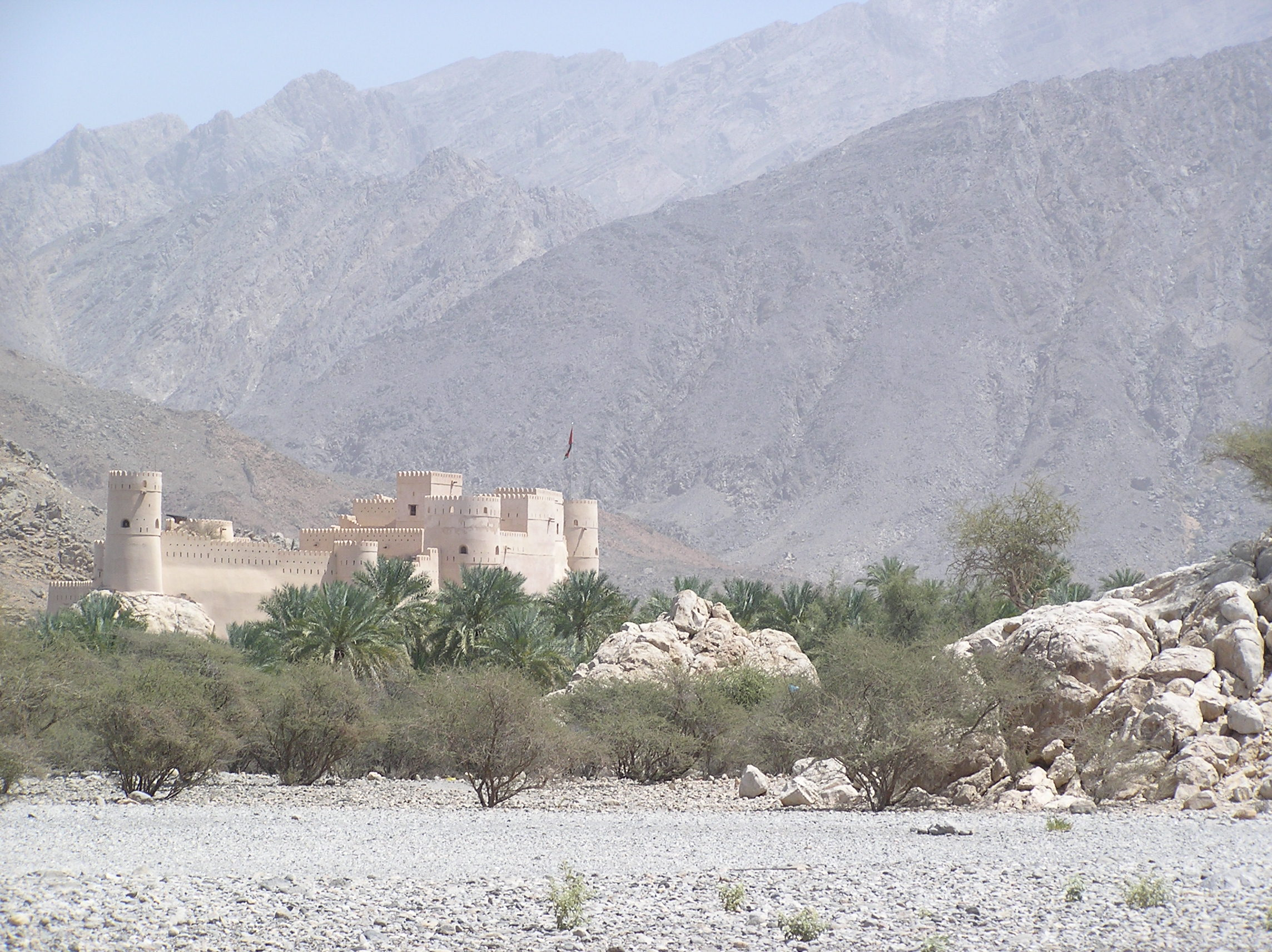
Nakhal Fort and the Hajar Mountains

During the childhood of Shapur II, Arab nomads raided the Sasanian homeland of Pars, particularly the district of Ardashir-Khwarrah and the shore of the Persian Gulf. At the age of 16, Shapur II led an expedition against the Arabs; primarily campaigning against the Iyad tribe in Asoristan and thereafter he crossed the Persian Gulf, reaching al-Khatt, modern Qatif, or present eastern Saudi Arabia. He then attacked the Banu Tamim in the Hajar Mountains. Shapur II reportedly killed a large number of the Arab population and destroyed their water supply by filling their wells with sand.

After having dealt with the Arabs of eastern Arabia, he continued his expedition into western Arabia and Syria, where he attacked several cities—he even went as far as Medina. Supposedly because of his cruel way of dealing with the Arabs, piercing the shoulders of captives, he was called Dhu'l-Aktaf ("the man with the shoulders") by them. (Note: The Middle Persian rendering of that would be Šānag āhanj.) However, Theodor Nöldeke considered this a later folkloric explanation of an honorary epithet meaning "the man with the broad shoulders", i.e., capable of bearing the weight of kingship. Not only did Shapur II pacify the Arabs of the Persian Gulf, but he also pushed many Arab tribes further deep into the Arabian Peninsula. Furthermore, he also deported some Arab tribes by force; the Taghlib to Bahrain and al-Khatt; the Banu Abdul Qays and Banu Tamim to Hajar; the Banu Bakr to Kirman, and the Banu Hanzalah to a place near Hormizd-Ardashir. Shapur II, in order to prevent the Arabs from making more raids into his country, ordered the construction of a wall near al-Hira, which became known as war-i tāzigān ("wall of the Arabs").

The Zoroastrian scripture Bundahishn also mentions the Arabian campaign of Shapur II:

During the rulership of Shapur (II), the son of Hormizd, the Arabs came; they took Khorig Rudbar; for many years with contempt (they) rushed until Shapur came to rulership; he destroyed the Arabs and took the land and destroyed many Arab rulers and pulled out many number of shoulders.

With Eastern Arabia more firmly under Sasanian control, and with the establishment of Sasanian garrison troops, the way for Zoroastrianism was opened. Pre-Islamic Arabian poets often makes mention of Zoroastrian practices, which they must have made contact with either in Asoristan or Eastern Arabia. The Lakhmid ruler Imru' al-Qays ibn 'Amr, who was originally a vassal of the Sasanians, may have suffered from Shapur II's raids in Peninsula. He seemingly swore fealty to the Romans, possibly after the incident.

In the accounts of the historians regarding Shapur's campaign against the Arab lands, as well as his mistreatment of the Arabs, the burning of cities, and the flooding of water sources, there are undoubtedly significant exaggerations. These embellishments stem from Persian sources that have been greatly overstated. However, the Roman historians' narratives about this event do not support this claim.

== War with the Romans ==
=== Objectives ===
Ever since the "humiliating" Peace of Nisibis concluded between Shapur's grandfather Narseh and the Roman emperor Diocletian in 298, the borders between the two empires had changed largely in favor of the Romans, who in the treaty received a handful of provinces in Mesopotamia, changing the border from the Euphrates to the Tigris, close to the Sasanian capital of Ctesiphon. The Romans also received control over the kingdoms of Iberia and Armenia, and gained control over parts of upper Media in Iran proper. Shapur's primary objective was thus to nullify the treaty, which he spent much of his reign trying to accomplish.

Another cause for Shapur's wars against the Romans was their attempts to meddle in the domestic affairs of the Sasanian Empire and hurt Shapur's kingship by supporting his brother Hormizd, who had been well received at the Roman court by Constantine the Great and made a cavalry commander. Shapur had made fruitless attempts to satisfy his brother, even having his wife sent to him, who had originally helped him escape imprisonment. However, Hormizd had already become an avid philhellene during his stay with the Romans, with whom he felt at home. Another reason was Constantine's declaration of Christianity as the official religion of the Roman Empire in 337. He had also declared himself the defender of all the Christians in the world, including those living in the Sasanian realm.

=== Early campaigns and first war against the Romans ===
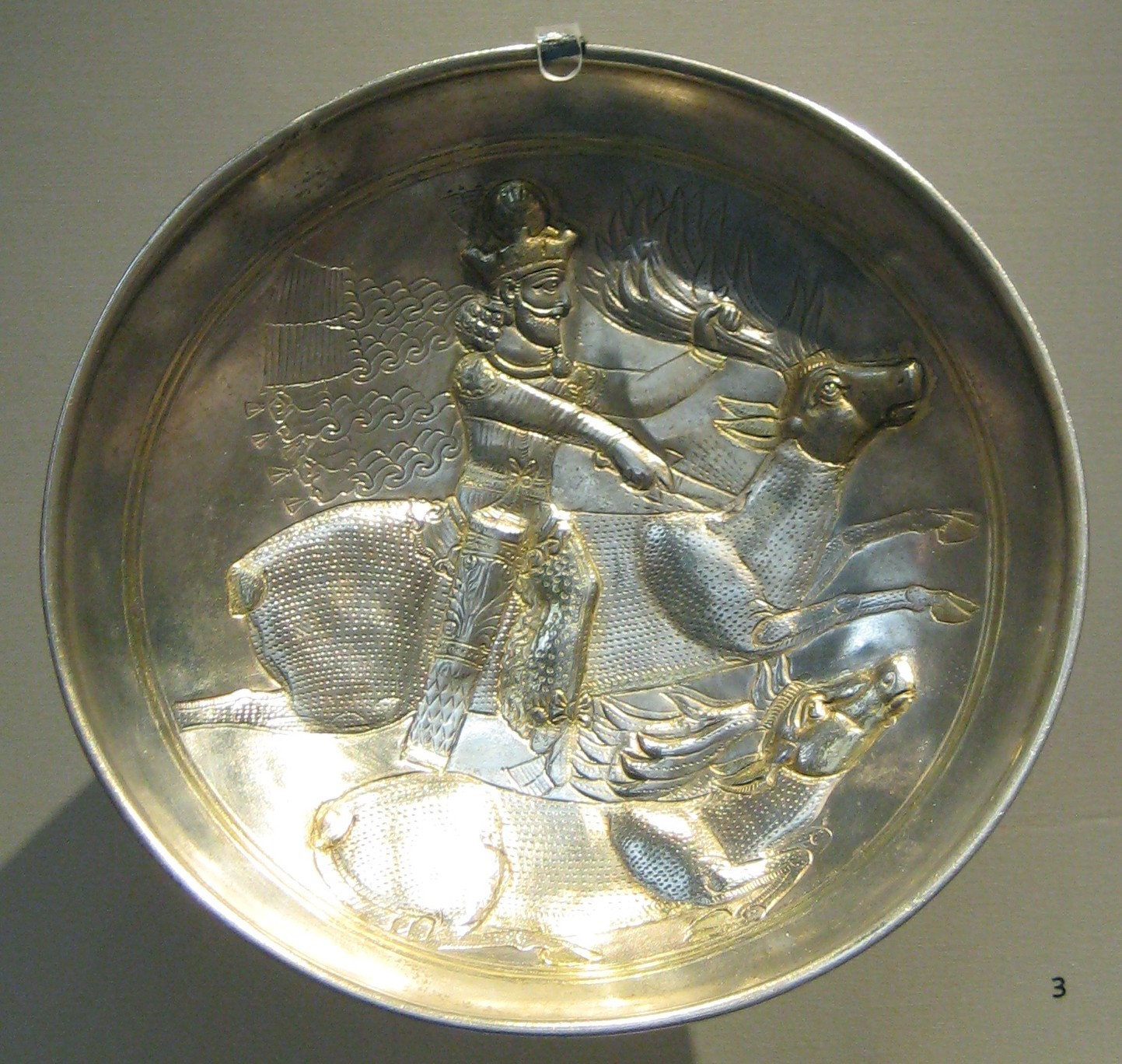
Gilded silver plate showing a king (identified as Shapur II) hunting a deer whilst riding a stag, in the British Museum

In 337, after the accession of Constantius II to the Roman throne, Shapur II, provoked by the Roman rulers' backing of Armenia and the Armenian kingdom's earlier conversion to Christianity, (Note: Lee E. Patterson writes, "That Armenia should officially become Christian was troubling mainly because such a transformation aligned it with the Romans even more than before.") broke the peace concluded in 298 between Narseh (293–302) and Diocletian (284–305), which had been observed for forty years. Most of the fighting during this campaign occurred in Roman Mesopotamia, where Roman fortifications impeded the Persian advance. Nevertheless, Shapur was able to take some forts, such as Vitra. Persian forces also devastated Armenia and captured and blinded the Armenian king Tiran, perhaps in 350. Shapur besieged the Roman fortress city of Nisibis in Mesopotamia thrice (in 338, 346, and 350) and was repulsed each time. During this campaign, the sole engagement between the sides' main armies was the Battle of Singara (modern-day Sinjar, Iraq) in 344. (Note: The date of the battle is disputed, and some scholars have suggested that there were actually two battles of Singara. See the references in Potter 2004, p. 690, note 140 and Dodgeon & Lieu 2005, pp. 329–330. According to Potter, K. Mosig-Walburg conclusively demonstrated that there was one battle in 344 in the article "Zur Schlacht bei Singara", Historia 48 (1999): 330–84.) Both sides claimed victory but ultimately the battle was indecisive, with both armies sustaining heavy casualties. Neither side managed to achieve a decisive advantage, and an invasion of Central Asian nomads in the east forced Shapur to abandon his campaign against Rome by 350. These nomads were likely the Kidarites, who were threatening the Gupta Empire (320–500 CE) in India at the same time. After an extended campaign against the nomads, Shapur forced their king, Grumbates, into an alliance, thus gaining a new ally against the Romans. In particular, Grumbates's forces joined the Persians in the Siege of Amida in 359.

=== Second war against the Romans and invasion of Armenia ===
Map showing Julian's journey from Constantinople to Antioch (in 362) and his Persian expedition (in 363), ending with his death near Samarra

In 356, Shapur rejected a peace overture by Constantius, replying that Rome should return Armenia and other territories lost by Persia in the Treaty of Nisibis. In 359, Shapur II invaded southern Armenia and besieged the fortress of Amida (now Diyarbakır, Turkey). He was joined by King Grumbates's forces and other allies. (Note: These were the Caucasian Albanians, Gelani, Mardians and Segestani.) Amida surrendered after a seventy-three-day siege. The city was plundered and its inhabitants were deported to Khuzistan. Shapur II conducted great hosts of captives from the Roman territory into his dominions, most of whom were settled in Elam. Here he rebuilt Susa—after having killed the city's rebellious inhabitants. The delay forced Shapur to halt operations for the winter. Early the following spring he continued his operations against the Roman fortresses, capturing Singara and Bezabde (Cizre?), again at a heavy cost. In the next year Constantius II launched a counterattack, having spent the winter making massive preparations in Constantinople; Shapur, who had meanwhile lost the aid of his Asianic allies, avoided battle, but left strong garrisons in all the fortresses which he had captured. Constantius laid siege to Bezabde, but proved incapable of taking it, and retired on the approach of winter to Antioch, where he died soon after. Constantius was succeeded by his cousin Julian (361–363), who came to the throne determined to avenge the recent Roman reverses in the east. Though Shapur attempted an honorable reconciliation, warned of the capabilities which Julian had displayed in wars against the Alemanni in Gaul, the emperor dismissed negotiation.

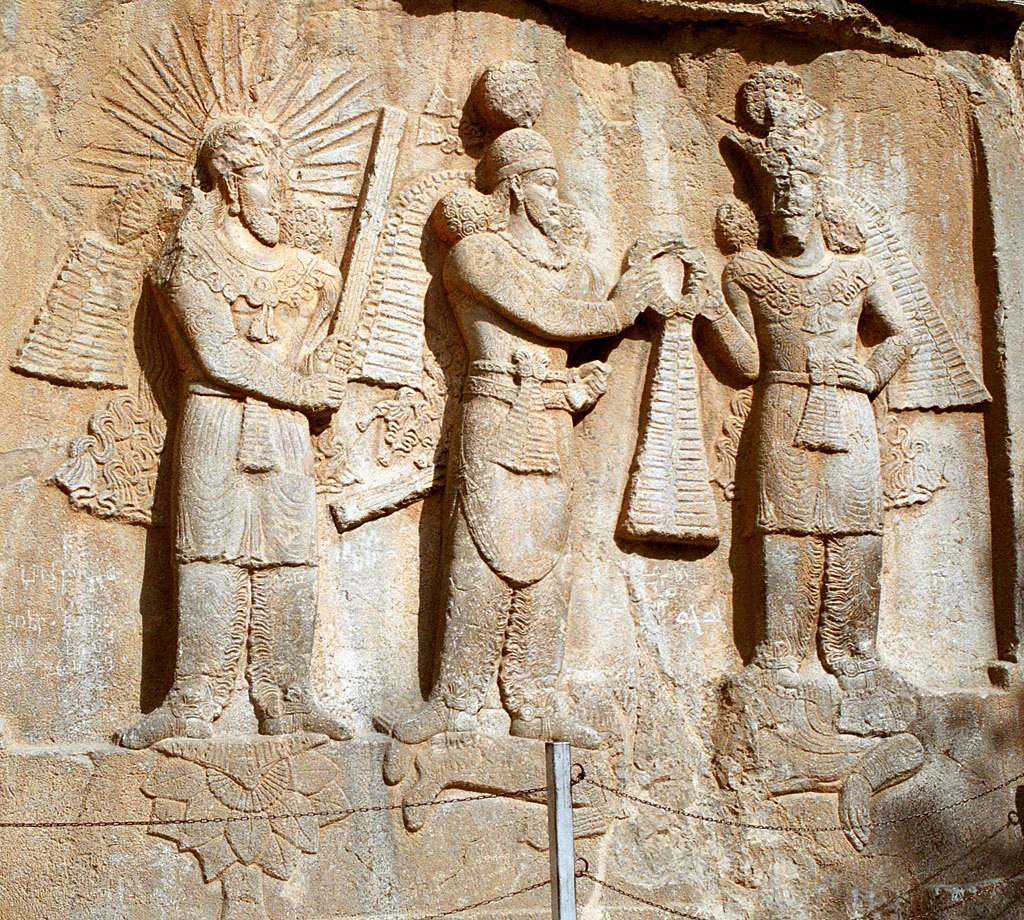
Sasanian relief of the investiture of Ardashir II showing Mithra, Shapur II, and Ahura Mazda above a defeated Julian, lying prostrate

In 363 Julian, at the head of a strong army, advanced to Shapur's capital city of Ctesiphon and defeated a presumably larger Sasanian force at the Battle of Ctesiphon; however, he was unable to take the fortified city, or engage with the main Persian army under Shapur II that was approaching. Julian was killed by the enemy in a skirmish during his retreat back to Roman territory. His successor Jovian (363–364) made an ignominious peace in which the districts beyond the Tigris which had been acquired in 298 were given to the Persians along with Nisibis and Singara, and the Romans promised to interfere no more in Armenia. The great success is represented in the rock sculptures near the town Bishapur in Pars (Stolze, Persepolis, p. 141); under the hooves of the king's horse lies the body of an enemy, probably Julian, and a supplicant Roman, the Emperor Jovian, asks for peace.

According to the peace treaty between Shapur and Jovian, Georgia and Armenia were to be ceded to the Sasanians, and the Romans forbidden from further involvement in the affairs of Armenia. In Georgia, then known as Iberia, where the Sasanians were also given control, Shapur II installed Aspacures II of Iberia in the east; however, in western Georgia, Valens also succeeded in setting up his own king, Sauromaces II of Iberia. The Armenian King Arshak II, who had joined Julian's campaign, was lured to Persia and imprisoned in the Castle of Oblivion (Armenian: berd An(y)ush) in Khuzistan. (Note: Supposedly, Arshak then committed suicide during a visit by his eunuch Drastamat, although the Roman historian Ammianus Marcellinus (4th century) reports that Arshak was blinded and executed.) Shapur destroyed many towns in Armenia and deported their inhabitants to Persia. He persecuted the local Christians, erected fire temples and forced conversion to Zoroastrianism. The Persians were assisted in Armenia by the magnates Meruzhan Artsruni and Vahan Mamikonian, who were made governors of the country and one of whom was given Shapur's own sister in marriage. (Note: Shapur's sister, who is called Ormizdukht in the old Armenian histories, was given to Vahan according to the Buzandaran Patmutʻiwnkʻ and to Meruzhan according to Movses Khorenatsi.)

However, the Armenian nobles resisted him successfully, secretly supported by the Romans, who sent King Pap, the son of Arshak II, into Armenia. Shapur personally invaded Armenia in response to Pap's return, although Pap was restored to the Armenian throne again with the help of a Roman army in approximately spring 370. Persian forces were defeated by a joint Roman-Armenian army in 371, and an army led by Shapur himself was defeated in another battle on the eastern border of Armenia. According to contemporary historians, the Sassanids had to cede much of the southern Caucasus and northern Mesopotamia to the Romans and their Armenian allies, largely neutralizing the gains made by Shapur II in 363. Afterwards, a seven-year truce was negotiated, which ensured relative peace on the border until 378/379, shortly before Shapur II's death. Eventually, Pap was suspected of colluding with the Persians and was assassinated in 375 by the order of the Roman emperor Valens. Armenia was left in peace for the time being. The country was later partitioned between Rome and Persia in 387, under Shapur's son Shapur III.

== War in the East ==
=== Expansion into India (c. 350–358 CE) ===
==== Gandhara and Punjab ====
In the east around 350 CE, Shapur II gained the upper hand against the Kushano-Sasanian Kingdom during war and took control of large territories in areas now known as Afghanistan and Pakistan, possibly as a consequence of the destruction of the Kushano-Sasanians by the Chionites. The Kushano-Sasanian still ruled in the north. Important finds of Sasanian coinage beyond the Indus river in the city of Taxila only start with the reigns of Shapur II (r. 309–379) and Shapur III (r. 383–388), suggesting that the expansion of Sasanian control beyond the Indus was the result of the wars of Shapur II "with the Chionites and Kushans" from 350 to 358 CE as described by Ammianus Marcellinus. During the last phase of the reign of Shapur II, a Sasanian mint was established south of the Hindu Kush, the role of which was probably to pay local troops. The Sasanians probably maintained control until Bactria fell to the Kidarites under their ruler Kidara around 360 CE , and Kabulistan fell to the Alchon Huns circa 385 CE. Kidarites secured and Alliance With Gupta Emperor Samudragupta, After Completing His Campaigns In Aryavartha including India, Pakistan,Nepal,Bangladesh And Sinhala , Samudragupta Focused His Attention On Eastern Sasanian Territories. As Samudragupta was aggressively pushed the boundaries of Gupta Empire Northwest to the Indus River, He subjugated the remnant Kushan And Saka Principalities(Referred In The Allahabad Inscription Of Samudragupta Prayaga Prashasti Of Samudragupta As Daivaputra Shahi-Shahanshauhi). As a part of his campaigns Samudragupta's Subjugation Of The Kushan Empire. Experts Such As Historian R.K.Mookerjee Pointed Out that Shahi Directly Refers To The Little Kushans , While Shahansauhi Refers To The Sasanian or Kushano-Sasanian Forces Paid Tribute And Offered Allegiance To SamudraguptaBacked By Gupta Emperor Samudragupta's Resources , Kidara Rebelled Against Sasanian Empire and successfully defeated Shapur's Forces Twice Around 367-368 AD. This Effectively Severed The Eastern Most Territories of Sasanian Empire in Bactria,Gandhāra And Kabul Valley.

Around this time Of Samudragupta's Expansion With Kidara, Shapur's Forces were involved in extenstive wars against Roman Empire. The Gadahara Kidarite Gold Dinars were a special coinage with Bramhi Script positioned Vertically Under the King's Extended Left Arm On Specific Issues Minted In Gandhāra And Punjab The Name "Samudra" is explicitly StruckHistorian Ashwini Agarwal and other experts Pointed Out That these Gadahara coins mentioning "Samudra" was probably hinting that Samudragupta heavily funded and backed Kidara which helped Kidara to Rebel Against Sasanian Empire directly leading to the Sasanian- Kidarite warsWith The Backing Of Samudragupta's Force Kidarites Inflicted massive defeats on Shapur's Forces In Bactria And Kabul Valley In Afghanistan. Caught Between Roman Forces pushing from europe and Samudragupta Backed Kidarite Forces advancing through Asia Shapur's Resources Were Spread Dangerously thin Leaving Shapur unable to prevent the permanent collapse of Indian frontier

==== Sindh ====
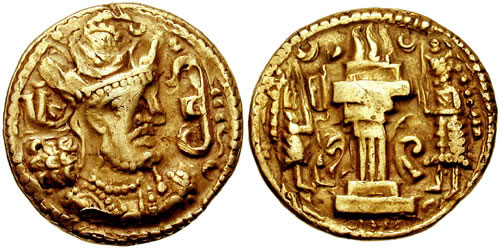
Shapur II coinage of Sindh. Such coins were minted in Sind, Baluchistan and Kutch in India, as well as coins of his successors down to Peroz I, although the Sasanians probably did not rule there directly.

In the area of Sindh, from Multan to the mouth of the Indus river, an important series of gold coins started to be issued on the model of the coinage of Shapur II, and would continue down to Peroz I. The coins are not the usual Sasanian imperial type, and the legend around the portrait tends to be degraded Middle Persian in the Pahlavi script, but they have the Brahmi script character Sri (meaning "Lord") in front of the portrait of the King. The coins suggest some sort of Sasanian control of Sind from the time of Shapur II, and a recognition of Sasanian overlordship, but the precise extent of the Sasanian presence or influence is unknown.

=== Loss of Bactria to nomadic invaders (c. 360 CE) ===
Confrontations with nomadic tribes from Central Asia soon started to occur. Ammianus Marcellinus reports that in 356 CE, Shapur II was taking his winter quarters on his eastern borders, "repelling the hostilities of the bordering tribes" of the Chionites and the Euseni ("Euseni" is usually amended to "Cuseni", meaning the Kushans), finally making a treaty of alliance with the Chionites and the Gelani in 358 CE.

From around 360 CE, however, during his reign, the Sasanids lost the control of Bactria to invaders from the north, first the Kidarites, then the Hephthalites and the Alchon Huns, who would follow up with the invasion of India. These invaders initially issued coins based on Sasanian designs. Various coins minted in Bactria and based on a Sasanian designs are known, often with busts imitating Sasanian kings Shapur II (r. 309 to 379 CE) and Shapur III (r. 383 to 388 CE), adding the Alchon Tamgha and the name "Alchono" in Bactrian script on the obverse, and with attendants to a fire altar on the reverse.

== Death and succession ==
Shapur died in 379 and was succeeded by his slightly younger brother Ardashir II, who agreed to rule until Shapur's son Shapur III reached adulthood. At the time of Shapur's death, the Sasanian Empire was stronger than it had ever been, and it was also considerably larger than when he came to the throne, the eastern and western enemies were pacified and Persia had gained control over Armenia. He is regarded as one of the most important Sasanian kings along with Shapur I and Khosrow I, and could after a long period of instability regain the old strength of the Empire. His three successors, however, were less successful than he. Furthermore, his death marked the start of a 125-year-long conflict between the wuzurgan, a powerful group of nobility, and the kings, who both struggled for power over Iran.

== Religious policy ==
Under Shapur II's reign, the collection of the Avesta was completed, heresy and apostasy punished, and the Christians persecuted (see Abdecalas, Acepsimas of Hnaita, and Abda of Kashkar). This was a reaction against the Christianization of the Roman Empire by Constantine.

According to Armenian and primary sources, the Sasanian shahs revered the sun and the moon, with Roman sources stating that Shapur II asserted to be the "brother of the Sun and the Moon" (Latin: frater Solis et Lunae). This is however not mentioned in Sasanian sources, which implies that there are two possibilities; one that it is regarding about the angelic divinity Mithra, whilst the other one being that it may be an Indo-Iranian characteristic where the shahs considered their ancestors descendants of Manuchehr (Indic Manu) and his father Wiwahvant (Indic Vivasvant), who were in India associated with the Moon and the Sun.

Shapur's own religious beliefs do not seem to have been very strict; he restored the family cult of Anahita in Istakhr and was possibly an adherent of Zurvanism as well as promoting the official orthodox variant of Zoroastrianism.

=== Towards Christians ===
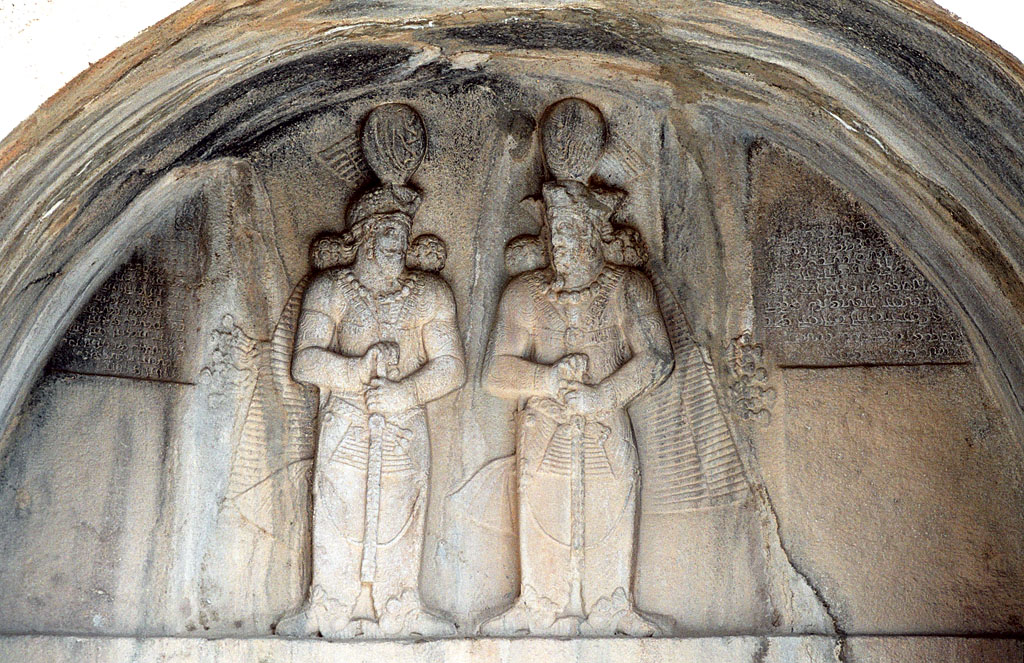
Taq-e Bostan: high-relief of Shapur II and Shapur III

Initially, Shapur II was not especially hostile to his Christian subjects specifically, who were led by Shemon Bar Sabbae, the Patriarch of the Church of the East. However, the conversion of Constantine the Great to Christianity caused Shapur to start heavily distrusting his Christian subjects, focusing on them specifically. This is because he started seeing them as possible agents of a foreign enemy. The wars between the Sasanian and Roman empires turned Shapur's mistrust into hostility. After the death of Constantine, Shapur II, who had been preparing for a war against the Romans for several years, imposed a double tax on his Christian subjects to finance the conflict. Shemon, however, refused to pay the double tax. Shapur started pressuring Shemon and his clergy to convert to Zoroastrianism, which they refused to do. It was during this period the 'cycle of the martyrs' began during which 'many thousands of Christians' were put to death. During the following years, Shemon's successors, Shahdost and Barba'shmin, were also martyred.

Barbasceminus, bishop of Seleucia and Ctesiphon from 342, was executed on 14 January 346 with sixteen of his clergy. A near-contemporary fifth-century Christian work, the Ecclesiastical History of Sozomen, contains considerable detail on the Persian Christians martyred under Shapur II. Sozomen estimates the total number of Christians killed as follows:

The number of men and women whose names have been ascertained, and who were martyred at this period, has been computed to be upwards of sixteen thousand, while the multitude of martyrs whose names are unknown was so great that the Persians, the Syrians, and the inhabitants of Edessa, have failed in all their efforts to compute the number.

— Sozomen, in his Ecclesiastical History, Book II, Chapter XIV

== Imperial beliefs and numismatics ==
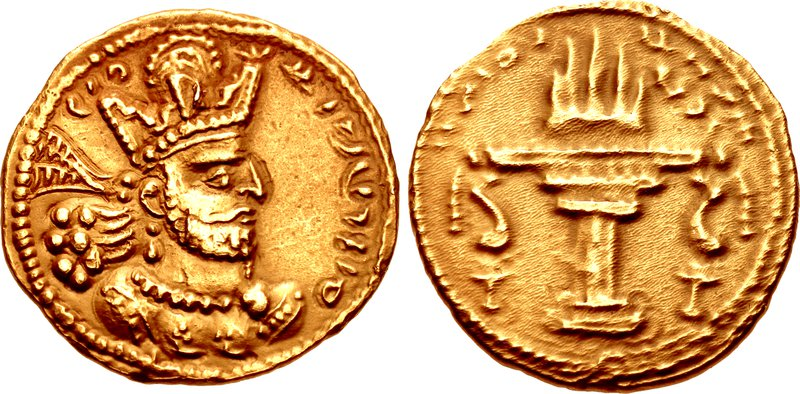
Gold dinar of Shapur II, struck c. 320

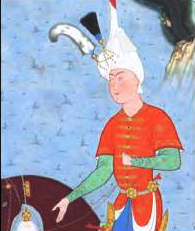
Shapur II in the Shahnameh of Shah Tahmasp

According to Ammianus Marcellinus, Shapur II fought the Romans in order to "re-conquer what had belonged to his ancestor". It is not known who Shapur II thought his ancestor was, probably the Achaemenids or the legendary Kayanian dynasty. During the reign of Shapur II, the title of "the divine Mazda-worshipping, king of kings of the Iranians, whose image/seed is from the gods" disappears from the coins that were minted. He was also the last Sasanian king to claim lineage from the gods.

Under Shapur II, coins were minted in copper, silver and gold, however, a great amount of the copper coins were made on Roman planchet, which is most likely from the riches that the Sasanians took from the Romans. The weight of the coins also changed from 7.20 g to 4.20 g.

== Building activity ==
Besides the construction of the war-i tāzigān near al-Hira, Shapur II is also known to have created several other cities. He created a royal city called Eranshahr-Shapur, where he settled Roman prisoners of war. He also rebuilt and repopulated Nisibis in 363 with people from Istakhr and Spahan. In Asoristan, he founded Wuzurg-Shapur ("Great Shapur"), a city on the west side of the Tigris. He also rebuilt Susa after having destroyed it when suppressing a revolt, renaming it Eran-Khwarrah-Shapur ("Iran's glory [built by] Shapur").

== Issue ==
Besides his son Shapur III, Shapur II had a daughter, Zurvandukht, who was named after Zurvan, a deity in Zoroastrianism. She is attested only in the 5th-century Armenian history Buzandaran Patmutiwnk as the wife of the Armenian king Khosrov IV.

== Bibliography ==
=== Ancient works ===
- Agathias (1975). The Histories. Translated with an introduction and explanatory notes by Joseph D. Frendo. Berlin: de Gruyter. ISBN 978-3-11-003357-1.
- Ammianus Marcellinus, Res Gestae
- Faustus of Byzantium (1989). Garsoïan, Nina (ed.). The Epic Histories Attributed to Pʻawstos Buzand: (Buzandaran Patmutʻiwnkʻ). Cambridge, Massachusetts: Department of Near Eastern Languages and Civilizations, Harvard University Press. ISBN 978-0-674-25865-5.

=== Modern works ===
- Al-Tabari, Abu Ja'far Muhammad ibn Jarir (1991). Yar-Shater, Ehsan (ed.). The History of al-Ṭabarī, Volume V: The Sasanids, the Byzantines, the Lakhmids, and Yemen. Trans. Clifford Edmund Bosworth. Albany, NY: State University of New York Press. ISBN 0-7914-0493-5.
- Bosworth, C.E. (1983). "Iran and the Arabs before Islam". In Yarshater, Ehsan (ed.). The Cambridge History of Iran: The Seleucid, Parthian and Sasanian Periods. Vol. 3(1). Cambridge: Cambridge University Press. pp. 593–613. ISBN 0-521-20092-X.
- Boyce, Mary (1984). Zoroastrians: Their Religious Beliefs and Practices. Psychology Press. ISBN 9780415239028.
- Chaumont, M. L. (1986). "Armenia and Iran ii. The pre-Islamic period". In Yarshater, Ehsan (ed.). Encyclopædia Iranica. Vol. II/4: Architecture IV–Armenia and Iran IV (Online ed.). Encyclopædia Iranica Foundation. pp. 418–438.
- Daryaee, Touraj (2014). Sasanian Persia: The Rise and Fall of an Empire. I.B.Tauris. ISBN 978-0857716668.
- Daryaee, Touraj (2009). "Šāpur II". In Yarshater, Ehsan (ed.). Encyclopædia Iranica (Online ed.). Encyclopædia Iranica Foundation.
- Dodgeon, Michael H.; Lieu, Samuel N. C. (2005) [Originally published 1991]. The Roman Eastern Frontier and the Persian Wars AD 226-363: A Documentary History (e-book ed.). London: Routledge. ISBN 0-203-42534-0.
- Drijvers, Jan Willem (2016). "Ammianus Marcellinus, King Pap and the Dominance over Armenia". In Binder, Carsten; Börm, Henning; Luther, Andreas (eds.). Diwan: Studies in the History and Culture of the Ancient Near East and the Eastern Mediterranean. Festschrift für Josef Wiesehöfer zum. Vol. 68. Duisburg: Wellem. pp. 571–590. ISBN 978-3-941820-24-1.
- Frye, R. N. (1983). "The political history of Iran under the Sasanians". In Yarshater, Ehsan (ed.). The Cambridge History of Iran: The Seleucid, Parthian and Sasanian Periods. Vol. 3(1). Cambridge: Cambridge University Press. ISBN 0-521-20092-X.
- Garsoïan, Nina (1997). "The Aršakuni Dynasty". In Hovannisian, Richard G. (ed.). The Armenian People from Ancient to Modern Times. Vol. 1. New York: St. Martin's Press. ISBN 0-312-10169-4.
- Ghosh, Amalananda (1965). Taxila. CUP Archive. pp. 790–791.
- Harper, Prudence; Aruz, Joan; Tallon, Frangoise (1992). The Royal City of Susa: Ancient Near Eastern Treasures in the Louvre. New York: The Metropolitan Museum of Art.
- Hughes, Ian (2013). Imperial Brothers: Valentinian, Valens and the Disaster at Adrianople. Pen & Sword. ISBN 978-1848844179.
- Kia, Mehrdad (2016). The Persian Empire: A Historical Encyclopedia. [2 volumes]. ABC-CLIO. ISBN 978-1610693912.
- Langer, William L., ed. (1952). An Encyclopedia Of World History. Boston: Houghton Mifflin Company.
- Lenski, Noel (2002). Failure of Empire: Valens and the Roman State in the Fourth Century A.D. University of California Press. ISBN 978-0-520-28389-3.
- Lieu, Samuel; Montserrat, Dominic (1995). From Constantine to Julian: Pagan and Byzantine Views: A Source History. Routledge.
- Meyer, Eduard (1911). "Shapur" . In Chisholm, Hugh (ed.). Encyclopædia Britannica. Vol. 24 (11th ed.). Cambridge University Press. p. 804.
- Patterson, Lee E. (2017). "Minority Religions in the Sasanian Empire: Suppression, Integration and Relations with Rome". In Sauer, Eberhard (ed.). Sasanian Persia: Between Rome and the Steppes of Eurasia. Edinburgh University Press.
- Potter, David S. (2004). The Roman Empire at Bay, AD 180–395. London: Routledge. ISBN 0-203-40117-4.
- Potts, Daniel T. (1999). The archaeology of Elam: Formation and transformation of an ancient Iranian state. Cambridge: Cambridge University Press. ISBN 978-0-521-56496-0.
- Potts, Daniel T. (2012). "Arabia ii. The Sasanians and Arabia". In Yarshater, Ehsan (ed.). Encyclopædia Iranica (Online ed.). Encyclopædia Iranica Foundation.
- Pourshariati, Parvaneh (2008), Decline and Fall of the Sasanian Empire: The Sasanian-Parthian Confederacy and the Arab Conquest of Iran, London and New York: I.B. Tauris, ISBN 978-1-84511-645-3
- Rezakhani, Khodadad (2017). ReOrienting the Sasanians: East Iran in Late Antiquity. Edinburgh University Press. ISBN 9781474400305. JSTOR 10.3366/j.ctt1g04zr8. (registration required)
- Sauer, Eberhard (2017). Sasanian Persia: Between Rome and the Steppes of Eurasia. London and New York: Edinburgh University Press. ISBN 9781474401029.
- Schindel, Nikolaus (2016). The Parthian and Early Sasanian Empires: adaptation and expansion. Oxbow Books. pp. 127–128. ISBN 9781785702105.
- Senior, R.C. (1991). "The Coinage of Sind from 250 AD up to the Arab Conquest" (PDF). Oriental Numismatic Society. 129 (June–July 1991): 3–4. Archived from the original (PDF) on 26 September 2019.
- Shayegan, M. Rahim (2004). "On the Rationale behind the Roman Wars of Šābuhr II the Great". Bulletin of the Asia Institute. 18: 111–133. JSTOR 24049144.
- Shahbazi, A. Shapur (1986). "Ardašīr II". In Yarshater, Ehsan (ed.). Encyclopædia Iranica. Vol. II/4: Architecture IV–Armenia and Iran IV (Online ed.). Encyclopædia Iranica Foundation. pp. 380–381.
- Shahbazi, A. Shapur (1990). "Byzantine-Iranian relations". In Yarshater, Ehsan (ed.). Encyclopædia Iranica. Vol. IV/6: Burial II–Calendars II (Online ed.). Encyclopædia Iranica Foundation. pp. 588–599.
- Shahbazi, A. Shapur (2002). "Šāpur I". In Yarshater, Ehsan (ed.). Encyclopædia Iranica (Online ed.). Encyclopædia Iranica Foundation.
- Shahbazi, A. Shapur (2004). "Hormizd (2)". In Yarshater, Ehsan (ed.). Encyclopædia Iranica. Vol. XII/5: Homosexuality III–Human migration II (Online ed.). Encyclopædia Iranica Foundation. pp. 461–462.
- Shahbazi, A. Shapur (2005). "Sasanian dynasty". In Yarshater, Ehsan (ed.). Encyclopædia Iranica (Online ed.). Encyclopædia Iranica Foundation.
- Sozomen, Hermias (2018). The Ecclesiastical History of Sozomen. Translated by Edward Walford. Merchantville, NJ: Evolution Publishing. p. 59. ISBN 978-1-935228-15-8.
- Tafazzoli, Ahmad (1983). "Ādur Narseh". In Yarshater, Ehsan (ed.). Encyclopædia Iranica. Vol. I/5: Adat–Afghanistan (Online ed.). Encyclopædia Iranica Foundation. p. 477.
- Tafazzoli, Ahmad (1989). "Bozorgān". In Yarshater, Ehsan (ed.). Encyclopædia Iranica. Vol. IV/4: Bolbol I–Brick (Online ed.). Encyclopædia Iranica Foundation. p. 427.

Shapur II Sasanian dynasty Born: 309 Died: 379
Preceded by Adur Narseh	King of Kings of Iran and non-Iran; 309–379	Succeeded by Ardashir II
