= Hormizd (son of Hormizd II) =

Sasanian Persian prince

Hormizd (Middle Persian; in Ancient Greek: Ὁρμίσδας Hormisdas, Ormisdas; Persian: هرمز) was a Sasanian prince, the third son of King Hormizd II and brother-in-law of King Shapur II. Imprisoned by him, he was freed by his wife in 323 and escaped to Constantinople, where Roman Emperor Constantine I helped him and gave him the Hormisdas Palace near the shore of the Sea of Marmara. This palace became an important toponym of the city: its neighborhood (where the mosque of Little Hagia Sophia still stands) was known in Byzantine times as en tois Hormisdou (ἐν τοῖς Ὁρμίσδου), meaning "near the houses of Hormisdas". Later, the palace became the private residence of Byzantine Emperor Justinian I, before his accession to the throne.

In 363, Hormizd served against Persia in the army of the Emperor Julian (361–363); in turn, his son, of the same name, later served as proconsul (Ammianus Marcellinus 26.8.12).

== Sources ==
- Janin, Raymond (1950). Constantinople Byzantine (in French). Paris: Institute Français d'Ètudes Byzantines.
- Wiesehöfer, Josef (2018). "Hormisdas". In Nicholson, Oliver (ed.). The Oxford Dictionary of Late Antiquity. Oxford: Oxford University Press. ISBN 978-0-19-866277-8.
- Woods, David (2020). "Hormisdas and the Romano-Persian Treaty of 363". Mnemosyne. 73 (3): 501–509. doi:10.1163/1568525X-12342811.
