= Alireza Shapour Shahbazi =

Iranian archaeologist (1942–2006)

Ali Reza Shapour Shahbazi
- علیرضا شاپور شهبازی
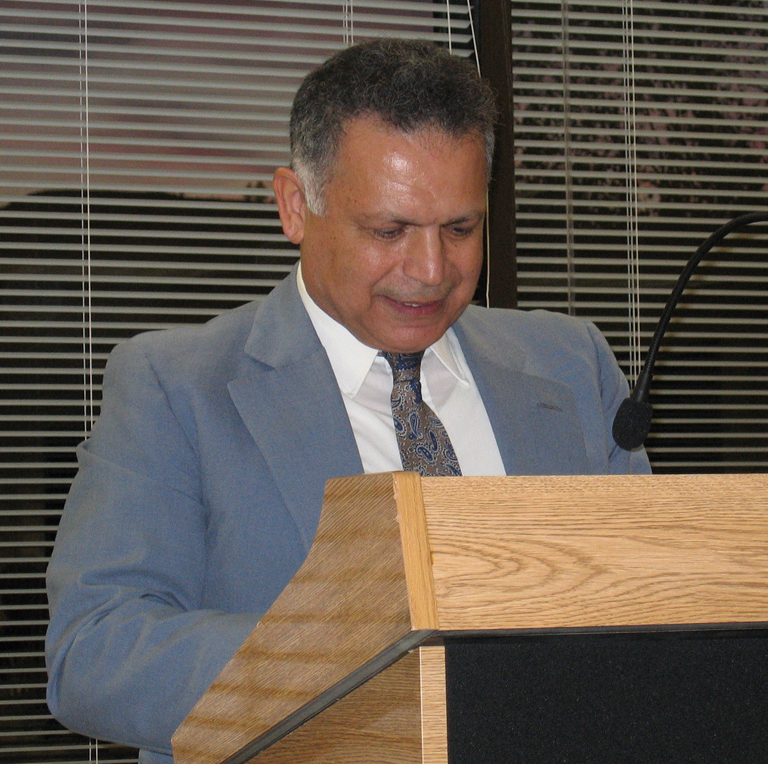
- Born: September 4, 1942; Shiraz, Iran
- Died: July 15, 2006 (aged 63); Washington D.C., United States
- Resting place: Hafezieh
- Scientific career
- Fields: School of Oriental and African Studies
- Workplaces: Shiraz University; University of Göttingen; University of Tehran; Harvard University; Columbia University

Alireza Shapour Shahbazi (Persian: علیرضا شاپور شهبازی; 4 September 1942 Shiraz - 15 July 2006 Walla Walla, Washington) was a prominent Iranian archaeologist, Iranologist and a world expert on Achaemenid archaeology. Shahbazi got a BA degree in and an MA degree in East Asian archaeology from SOAS. Shahbazi had a doctorate degree in Achaemenid archaeology from University of London. Alireza Shapour Shahbazi was a lecturer in Achaemenid archaeology and Iranology at Harvard University. He was also a full professor of archaeology at Shiraz University and founded at Persepolis the Institute of Achaemenid Research in 1974. After the Islamic revolution, he moved to the US, firstly teaching at Columbia University and then later becoming a full professor of history in Eastern Oregon University.

While employed at Columbia, Shahbazi became involved with the formation of the Encyclopædia Iranica. Shahbazi, who also served as visiting associate editor until 2003, would also author 76 articles of varying topics covering the Achaemenids, Arsacids, and Sasanian periods of Iran.

Shahbazi wrote numerous classic books and articles on archaeology (Achaemenid, Sassanian and Islamic) in English, German, French, and the Persian language. He died on 15 July 2006 after a long battle with cancer. He was transferred to Shiraz and buried in the memorials surrounding the Tomb of Hafez (Tomb of Hafez).

== Academic career ==
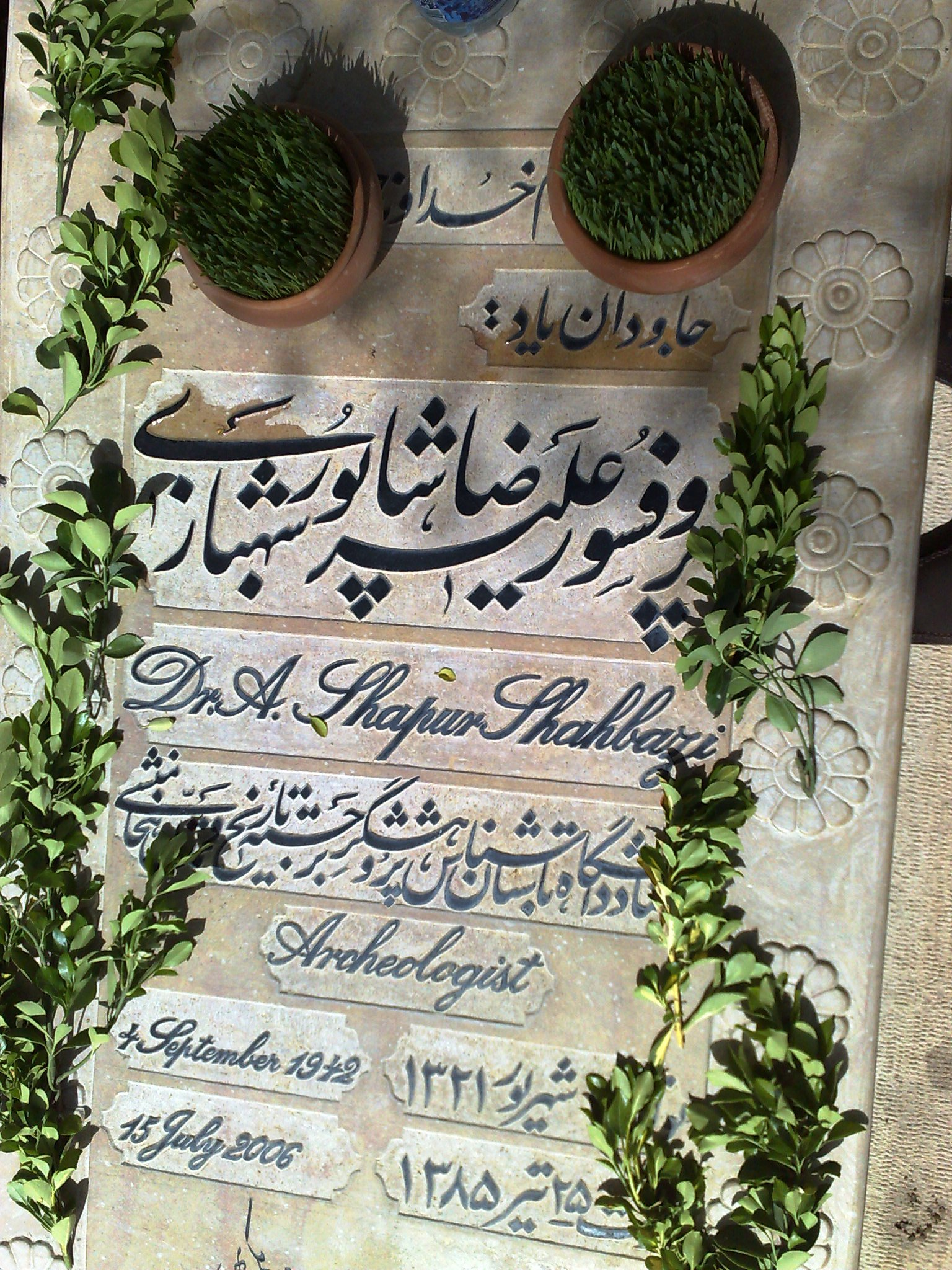
Shahbazi's gravestone at Hafezieh

- 1968–71 Instructor in Near Eastern history, Shiraz University (Also classes held for EXPERIENCE: American guest students from Pennsylvania and Kent State Universities)
- 1973–74 Curator, Archaeological Museum, Tehran; lecturer in history and Near Eastern civilization, University of Tehran
- 1974–79 Founding director of the Archaeological Institute at Persepolis; lecturer in Near Eastern history, Asia Institute, Shiraz
- 1979–80 Visiting scholar, Columbia University
- 1980–83 Post-doctoral research in historiography, Göttingen University, Germany
- 1983–84 Lecturer in Iranian civilization, University Extension, Harvard University; associate of the Department of Near Eastern Languages and Civilizations, Harvard University
- 1984–85 Lecturer in Persian, Columbia University; assistant editor Encyclopædia Iranica
- 1985– Associate professor (professor since 1990) of history, Eastern Oregon University
- 1990-2005 - Professor of history, Eastern Oregon University
- 1996- Consulting editor, The University Press of Iran
- 1998 Consulting editor, Journal of Archaeology and History
- 2002–2003 Associate editor Encyclopædia Iranica
- 2002- Consulting editor, The International Journal of Ancient Iranian Studies

== Awards ==
- 1970 Book of the Year Prize (see Bibliography, #1)
- INCLUDE 1980-83 Alexander von Humboldt Fellowship, West Germany
- 1995 Outstanding Faculty Advisor, Phi Alpha Theta History Honour Society
- 2005 Distinguished Faculty, Eastern Oregon University
- 2005 Distinguished Career Achievement, the Middle East Study Association.

== Works ==
=== Books ===
I. Publications: A. Book (see also D. Translation)

1. Cyrus the Great: Founder of the Persian Empire (Shiraz University Publication, No. 19, Shiraz 1970; awarded Book of the Year Prize, 1970).
2. Darius the Great (Shiraz University Publication, No. 26, Shiraz 1971), second revised version is in preparation.
3. A Persian Prince: Cyrus the Younger (Shiraz University Publication, No. 29, Shiraz 1971).
4. Illustrated Description of Naqš-i Rustam, (Tehran, 1978). Second revised edition in the press.
5. The Irano-Lycian Monuments: The Antiquities of Xanthos and Its Region as Evidence for the Iranian Aspects of the Achaemenid Lycia (Institute of Achaemenid Research Publication, No. II, Tehran 1975) [1973 Doctoral Thesis for London University].
6. Persepolis Illustrated (Institute of Achaemenid Research Publication, No. IV, Tehran 1976), second edition, Tehran (1997); third revised edition due out in April 2003.
7. Sharh-e Mosawwar-e Takht-e Jamshid (Institute of Achaemenid Research Publication, No. VI), Tehran 1966; third revised edition in the press.
8. Persepolis Illustre (French tr. by A. Surrat, Institute of Achaemenid Research Publication, No. III, Tehran 1977).
9. Illustrierte Beschreibung von Persepolis (German tr. by E. Niewoehner, Institute of Achaemenid Research Publication, No. V, Tehran 1977).
10. The Medes and The Persians, Tehran Open University text book, Tehran (1977).
11. A History of Iranian Historiography to A.D. 1000, Alexander von Humboldt Foundation sponsored study [publication ready].
12. Old Persian Inscriptions of Persepolis, I: Texts from the Platform Monuments [Corpus inscriptionum iranicarum I, 1. Portf. 1.], London (1985).
13. Persepolis IV: A comprehensive analysis of Persepolitan inscriptions and monument studied since E. F. Schmidt (in preparation).
14. Ferdows: A Critical Biography, Centre for Near Eastern Studies, Harvard University, (1991). Revised Persian version in preparation.
15. Passargadae. A Comprehensive and Illustrated Guide, Tehran 2000.
16. A Political History of the Sasanian Period, Persian Heritage Series, New York (forthcoming).
17. A Commentary on Tabari's History of the Sasanian Kings, The University Press of Iran, Tehran (due June 2003).
18. The Authoritative Guide to Persepolis, SAFIR Publication, Tehran, 2004
19. Rahnamaye Mostanade Takhte-Jamshid, Parsa-Pasargadae Research Foundation Publication, No. 1, Tehran, 2005.

=== Collaborations ===
20. Annotated ed. of P. J. Junge, Darieos I. König der Perser [Leipzig 1944], Institute of Achaemenid Research Publications, No. VIII. Shiraz (1978).
21. [Assistant Editor], Encyclopædia Iranica, Vol. II, London 1987.
22. [With O. P. Skaervø], Festschrift for Professor Richard Nelson Frye = Bulletin of the Asia Institute 4, 1990).
23. [Collaborator with Dina Amin and M. Kasheff], Acta Iranica 30. Papers in Honor of Professor Ehsan Yarshater Leiden (1990).
24. The Splendour of Iran, Vol. I: Ancient Times, Booth-Clibborn Editions of London and The University Press of Iran, London 2001.
25. [Associate Editor], Encyclopædia Iranica, vols. X-XI, New York, 2002–2003

=== Articles ===
26. "Cyrus the Great and Croesus", Khirad va Kushish 2 (1969), 157–74.
27. "The Expedition of Cyrus the Younger", Khirad va Kushish, 3 (1970), 332–50.
28. "An Achaemenid Tomb: The Gur-i Dukhtar at Buzpar", Bastanshinasi va hunare Iran, IV (1971), 54–6, 92–99.
29. "The 'One Year' of Darius Re-examined", Bulletin of the School of Oriental and African Studies [University of London] 30 (1972) 609–614.
30. "An Achaemenid Symbol. I: A Farewell to 'Fravahr' and 'Ahuramazda'", Archäologische Mitteilungen ans Iran NF. [Berlin] 7 (1974), 135–44.
31. "Some remarks on the Sh_hn_meh of Firdausi", Hunar va Mardum, Nos. 153-45 (1975), 118–120.
32. "The Persepolis 'Treasury Reliefs' once more", Archäologische Mitteilungen aus Iran NF. 9 (1976), 152–56.
33. 'The 'Traditional date of Zoroaster' explained", Bulletin of the School of Oriental and African Studies [University of London] 34 (1977), 25–35.
34. "From Parsa to Takht-i Jamshed", Archäologische Mitteilungen ans Iran 10 (1977), 197–207.
35. "New aspects of Persepolitan studies", Gymnasium 85 (1978), 478–500.
36. "Archaeological, historical and onomastical notes" on the Persian tr. of Herodotus' Historiae by Gh. Vahid Mazandarani, Tehran (1979, pp. 522–74).
37. "An Achaemenid Symbol II. Farnah '(God given) Fortune' symbolised", Archäologische Mitteilungen ans Iran 13 (1980), 119–47.
38. "Firdaus's Date of Birth," Zeitschrift der Deutschen Morgenländischen Gesellschaft 134 (1984), 98–105.
39. "The Sixth International Congress of Iranian Arts and Archaeology", Rahnamaye Ketab, 15 (1351/1972), 692–702.
40. "Darius in Scythia and Scythians in Persepolis," Archäologische Mitteilungen ans Iran 15 (1982), 189–236.
41. "Studies in Sasanian Iconography I. Narse's Investiture at Naqš-i Rustam", Archäologische Mitteilungen ans Iran 16 (1983), 255–68.
42. "Vareγna, the royal falcon," Zeitschrift der Deutschen Morgenländischen Gesellschaft 134 (1984), 314–17.
44. "Studies in S_s_nian Prosopography II. The relief of Ardašir II at Taq-i Bustan", Archäologische Mitteilungen ans Iran 18 (1985), 181–85.
45. "Darius' Haft-Kišvar", Archäologische Mitteilungen ans Iran. Erg_nzungsband 10 [Kunst, Kultur und Geschichte der Achämenidenzeit und ihr Nachleben, eds. H. M. Koch-D. N. Makenzie], Berlin (1983), 239–46.
46. "Iranian Notes 1-6", Acta Iranica 25 [=Papers in Honour of Professor Mary Boyce], Leiden (1985), 497–510.
47. "Iranian Notes 7-13", Archäologische Mitteilungen ans Iran 19 (1986), 163–170.
48. "Zadroz-e Firdausi" Ayanda: A Journal of Iranian Studies, 12 (1365/1986), 42–7.
49. "Babr-e Bayan", Ayanda 13 (1367/1988) 54–8.
50. "Guzidaha-ye Iranšinenasi", Ayanda 13 (1367/1988), 354–61.
51. "The Three Faces of Tigranes", American Journal of Ancient History Vol. 10, No. 2 (1985 [1993]), 124-36 (Harvard University).
52. "On the Xwaday-namag", Acta Iranica 30 [=Papers in Honor of Professor Ehsan Yarshater], Leiden (1990) 208–29.
53–58. "Huns"; "Isfahan"; "Panjikant"; "Pasargadae"; "Persepolis"; "Xerxes" in R. C. Bulliet ed., Encyclopaedia of Asian Studies (Middle East), New York (1988).
59. "Amazons" in E. Yarshater ed. Encyclopædia Iranica, Vol. I (London 1985), 929.
60. "Amorges", Encyclopædia Iranica, Vol. I, 986–87.
61. "Apama" Encyclopædia Iranica, Vol. II (London 1987), 150.
62. "Ardašir II", Encyclopædia Iranica, Vol. II, 380–81.
63. "Ardašir III", Encyclopædia Iranica, Vol. II, 381–82.
64. "Ardašir Sakanšah", Encyclopædia Iranica, Vol. II, 383–84.
65. "Ariaeos", Encyclopædia Iranica, Vol. II, 405–406.
66. "Ariaramaeia", Encyclopædia Iranica, Vol. II, 407–408.
67. "Ariobarzanes #2", Encyclopædia Iranica, Vol. II, 407–408.
68. "Ariyaramnes",. Encyclopædia Iranica, Vol. II, 410–411.
69. "Army in Ancient Iran", Encyclopædia Iranica, Vol. II, 489–99.
70. "Arnavaz", Encyclopædia Iranica, Vol. II, 517.
71. "Arsacid Origins", Encyclopædia Iranica, Vol. II, 525.
72. "Arsacid Era", Encyclopædia Iranica, Vol. II, 451–52.
73. "Arsacid Chronology in Traditional History", Encyclopædia Iranica, Vol. II, 542–43.
74."Aršama", Encyclopædia Iranica, Vol. II, 46.
75. "Arsites", Encyclopædia Iranica, Vol. II, 548.
76. "Artachaias", Encyclopædia Iranica, Vol. II, 651.
77. "Artyphios", Encyclopædia Iranica, Vol. II, 655.
78. "Asb (Horse) in Ancient Iran", Encyclopædia Iranica, Vol. II, 724–30.
79. "Aspacana", Encyclopædia Iranica, Vol. II, 786–87.
80. "Aspastes", Encyclopædia Iranica, Vol. II, 88.
81. "Astodan", Encyclopædia Iranica, Vol. II, 851–53.
82. "Bab-e Homayon", Encyclopædia Iranica, Vol. III (London 1989), 284–85.
83. "Bahram I", Encyclopædia Iranica, Vol. III, 515–16.
84. "Bahram II", Encyclopædia Iranica, Vol. III ibid., 516–17.
85. "Bahram-e Cobina", Encyclopædia Iranica, Vol. III, 519–22.
86. "Bestam o Bendoy", Encyclopædia Iranica, Vol. IV (London 1990), 180–82.
87. "Byzantine-Iranian Relations", Encyclopædia Iranica, Vol. IV, 588–599.
88. "Capital Cities", in E. Yarshater ed., Encyclopædia Iranica IV, 768–70.
89. "Cambadene", Encyclopædia Iranica, Vol. III, 724.
90. "Carrhae, Battle of", Encyclopædia Iranica, Vol. V (1991), 9–13.
91. "Characene in Rhagae", Encyclopædia Iranica, Vol. V, 365–66.
92. "Clothes: Iranian Costumes in the Median and Achaemenid Periods"; Encyclopædia Iranica, Vol. V, 722–737.
93. "Coronation: in Pre-Islamic Iran", Encyclopædia Iranica, Vol. V, 277–79.
94. "Croesus", Encyclopædia Iranica, Vol. V, 401–2.
95. "Crowns: iv - of Persian rulers from the Islamic conquest to the Qajar period", Encyclopædia Iranica, Vol. V, 421–25.
96. "Cunaxa:: battle of", Encyclopædia Iranica, Vol. VI, (1993), 455–56.
97. "Cyrus I of Anshan", Encyclopædia Iranica, Vol. VI, 516.
98. "Dance in Pre-Islamic Iran", Encyclopædia Iranica, Vol. VI, 640–41.
99. "Darius the Great", Encyclopædia Iranica, Vol.VII/1 (1994), 41–50.
100. "Dat-al-Salasel, Battle of", Encyclopædia Iranica, Vol.VII, 98.
101 "Deportation in the Achaemenid Period", Encyclopædia Iranica, Vol.VII, VII/3 (1994), 297.
102. "Derafš", Encyclopædia Iranica, Vol. VII/3 (1994), 312–15.
103. "Ferdowsi's hezara", Encyclopædia Iranica Vol. IX/5, pp. 527–30.
104. "Ferdowsi's Mausoleum", Encyclopædia Iranica Vol. IX, pp. 524–27.
105. "Flags. i. of Persia", Encyclopædia Iranica Vol. X, 12–27. 96.
106. "Godarzian," ibid., Encyclopædia Iranica Vol. XI, 2001, pp. 36–38.
107. "Gondišapur. i. the city", ibid., Encyclopædia Iranica Vol Xi, pp. 131–33.
108. "Kinship of Greek and Persian," in A. Ashraf Sadeqi ed, Tafazzoli Memorial Volume, Tehran 2000, 229-31
109 "Early Persians' interest in History", Bulletin of the Asia Institute, 4 (1990), 257–65.
110. "Napoleon and Iran", in Donald Horward et al. eds., Proceedings of the Consortium on Revolutionary Europe: Bicentennial of the French Revolution, 1990, 847–52.
111 "The Parthian Origins of the House of Rustam", Bulletin of the Asia Institute New Series, Vol. 7 (1993), 155–63.
112. "Persepolis and the Avesta", Archäologische Mitteilungen aus Iran, 27 (1994), 85–90.
113. "Early Sasanian Ladies: An Archaeological Investigation", in Sarkhosh-Curtis ed., Aspects of Parthian and Sasanian Iran, London, (1996) 136–42.
114 "The Eye of the King in Classical and Persian Literature" American Journal of Ancient History, (1988 [1997]), 170–89.
115 "Artiš dar Iran-e Bastan", Persian Journal of Archaeology and History X/2 (1996), 23–36.
116. "Asp va savarakri dar Iran-e Bastan", in ibid., XI (1997), 27–42.
117. "A specimen of marriage contract in Pahlavi and later Persian", Namvvra-yi Mamud Afšar IX, Tehran 1996, 5565-576
118. "Migration of Persians into Fars", Arjnama-ye Iraj, Tehran 1999, pp. 211–43.
119. "Oldest Description of Persepolis", Iranian Journal of Archaeology and History Vol. 13, 1999, pp. 31–8.
120. "Iran's Ancient History" in A. Sh. Shahbazi, ed., The Splendour of Iran, Vol. I, Ancient Times, London (2001), 46–53.
121. "Inscriptions", The Splendour of Iran, Vol. I, Ancient Times, 150–53.
122. "Creating the Median state", The Splendour of Iran, Vol. I, Ancient Times, 172–73.
123 "Achaemenid Art", The Splendour of Iran, Vol. I, Ancient Times, 174–245.
124. "Painting in Ancient Iran", The Splendour of Iran, Vol. I, Ancient Times., 342–47.
125. "Arms and Armor", The Splendour of Iran, Vol. I, Ancient Times, 430–47.
126. "Scripts of Ancient Iran", The Splendour of Iran, Vol. I, Ancient Times, 490–501.
127. "Courtly Past times", The Splendour of Iran, Vol. I, Ancient Times, 502–511.
128. "Iranians and Alexander", American Journal of Ancient History, New Series. 2 (2003), 5-38.
129. "Recent speculations on the 'Traditional date of Zoroaster'", Studia Iranica 31 (2002), 7-45.
130. "Early Sasanians' Claim to Achaemenid Heritage", Journal of Ancient Persian History I/1, Spring and Summer 2001, 61–73.
131. "Notes on the Shahnama, Vols I-V, of Khaleghi edition", Iranshenas, 13/2. 2001, 317–24.
132. "Goštasp", Encyclopædia Iranica, Vol. XI, pp. 171–76.:
133. "Harem", Encyclopædia Iranica, Vol XI, pp. 671–72 and Vol. XII, pp. 1–3.
134. "Did Goštasp marry his sister?," in T. Daryaee-M. Omidsala eds., The Spirit of Wisdom, Costa Mesa, Calif., 2004, pp. 232–37.
135 "Historiography in Pre-Islamic Iran", Encyclopædia Iranica, Vol. XII, 2003, pp. 325–330.
136. "Harut and Marut", Encyclopædia Iranica, Vol. XII, pp. 20–22.
137. "Hang-e Afrasiab," Encyclopædia Iranica, Vol. XI, pp. 655–57..
138. "Haft Sin (Seven S) Encyclopædia Iranica, Vol. XI, 511-15.
139. "Haft Kesvar", Encyclopædia Iranica, Vol. XI, pp. 519–24.
140. "Haft sin", Encyclopædia Iranica, Vol. XI. 524–26.
141. "Haftvad", Encyclopædia Iranica, Vol. XI, pp. 535–37.
142. "Mazdaean echoes in Shi'ite Iran" in Pheroza J. Godreji and Firoza Punthakey Mistree eds., A Zoroastrian Tapestry: Art, Religion and Cultur, Bombay and Singapore, 2002, pp. 246–57.
143. "The myth of next-of-kin marriage in ancient Iran", Iranian Journal of Archaeology and History 15/1-2, 2002, pp. 9–36.
144. "Hormozd II", Encyclopædia Iranica, XI, pp. 660–62.
145. "Hormozd, Sasanian Prince –brother of Shapur II", Encyclopædia Iranica, XI, pp. 662–63..
146 . "Hormozd, III", Encyclopædia Iranica, XI, pp. 663–64.
147. "Hormazd IV", Encyclopædia Iranica, XI, pp. 665–66.
148. "Hormazd, the prince", Encyclopædia Iranica, XI, pp. 667–68
149. "Hormazd V", Encyclopædia Iranica, XI pp. 669–70.
150. "Hormozd VI", Encyclopædia Iranica, XI pp. 670–72
151. "(Battle of) Homozdagan", Encyclopædia Iranica, XI pp. 672–74.
152. "Hormazd Kušanšah", Encyclopædia Iranica, XI, pp. 674–75.
153. "Hormozan", Encyclopædia Iranica, XI, pp. 675–76. 154–162. (On the website of the Encyclopædia Iranica,), "Nowruz", "Zal", "Iraj", "Sasanian Dynasty", "Shapur I", "Yazdegerd I", "Rudabeh", "Hoshang", "Persepolis", "Shiraz", 163. "Peter Julius Junge". Encyclopædia Iranica, XII, forthcoming. .
164. "Peter Calmeyer", Encyclopædia Iranica, XII, forthcoming.
165. "The History of the Idea of Iran", in Vesta Curtis ed., Birth of the Persian Empire, London (2005) forthcoming. C. Book Reviews (Selected)
166. G. Azarpay, Urartian Art and Artifacts: A Chronological Study University of California Press, Berkeley and Los Angeles 1968, in R_hnama-ye Kitab 12/1-2 (1348/1969), 62–65.
167. M. Boyce (tr.), The Letter of Tansar Rome, 1968, in ibid., 12/9-10 (1348/1969), 567–76.
168. A. D. H. Bivar, Catalogue of the Western Asiatic Seals in the British Museum: Stamp Seals, II - The Sassanian Dynasty, publ. by The Trustees of the British Museum, London 1969, in ibid., 13 (1349/1970), 465–68.
169. E. Yarshater ed., Encyclopædia Iranica II, London 1987, in The American Journal of Oriental Studies 110 (1990), 778–79.
170. Dj. Khaleghi-Motlagh ed., The Shahname of Abol Qasim Ferdowsi I, New York 1989, in ibidn., 111 (1991).
171. M. A. Dandamaev, A Political History of the Achaemenid Period, Eng. tr. W. J. Vogelsang, Leiden (1989), in Iranshenasi 3 (1991), 612–21.
172. J. Wiesehöfer, Die 'Dunklen Jahrhunderte' der Persis, Zetemata: Monographien zur Klassischen Altertumswissenschaft, no. 90. Munich: 1994, in Bulletin of the Asia Institute Vol. 9, 1995, pp. 270–73.
173. R. Schmitt's The Bistun Inscription of Darius the Great: Old Persian Text, London 1991, in the German journal Orientalische Literaturzeitung 92 (1997), 732–40.
174. Farraxvmart i Vahraman, The Book of A Thousand Judgments (A Sasanian Law Book), introduction, transcription, and translation of the Pahlavi text, notes, glossary and indexes by Anahit Perikhanian, translated from Russian by Nina Garsoian, Persian Heritage Series No. 39, Costa Mesa, California and New York (1997) in Iranian Studies 32/3 (1999), 418–21. 175. M. Brosius et al., Studies in Persian History: Essays in Memory of David M. Lewisi, Leiden, 1998, in Journal of Ancient Iranian Studies 1/2, 2003, pp. 47–9.
176. Piere Briant, History of the Persian Empire: From Cyrus to Alexander, New York, 2002: "A New Picture of the Achaemenid World", Journal of Ancient Persian History III/2, Autumn and Winter 2003–2004, pp. 69–80.

=== Selected papers ===
- Oxford Unviversity, September 1972: "Some remarks on the D_r_bgird Triumph relief", Sixth International Congress of Iranian Art and Archaeology
- LMU Munich, September 1976:"Costume and Nationality", Seventh International Congress of Iranian Art and Archaeology
- Harvard University, October 1983: "Prosopography of _Alexander Sarcophagus", Ancient History Seminar. Harvard University, November 1983: "Illustrations on Herodotus", Ancient History Seminars
- University of California at Berkeley: "Graeco-Persian reliefs", Near Eastern Department
- Harvard University: November 1988 "Sources of Islamic Art", Middle East Center
- Columbia University, November 1987: "Iranians on _Alexander Monuments"
- American Academy of Religion, Boston, November 1988: "The Eagle: A Persian Symbol of Rulership and Sacred Fire"
- University of California, Los Angeles, February 1990: "On the birthrate of Ferdowsi"
- University of London, Britain, March 1992: "Early Sasanian Ladies"
- Harvard University, February 1993: "Observations on Greco-Persian Sculptures"
- University of Sydney, Australia, October 1994: "The Political Identity of Persia"
- University of Washingtons, Seattle, May 1996: "Women of Ancient Iran".
- British Museum, London (Lukonin Lecture), July 2001: "From Scythia to Sardis: New Aspects of Persepolitan Art"
- Columbia University, May 2003: "The Iconography of Persepolis Seals"
- British Museum and London Middle Eastern Institute, June 2004: "On the History of the Idea of Iran, from the Avestan period to the present"

=== Documentaries ===
- 1976 "Crossroad of Civilization", BBC With David Frost, Parts 2-4: Achaemenids and Parthians
- 1999 "Heritage of Iran", Seda va sima, Jam- e Jam (Persian and English)
- 2000 "Spartans at the Gate", Discovery Channel and BBC
- 2002 "Persepolis: A New Look", Sunrise Production (Persian and English)
- 2003 "Perseplis Regained", BBC. Radio, Channel 4
- 2004 "Pasargadae and Tang-e Bulaghi", Emami Production

== See also ==
- Iranology
- Achaemenid Empire

Other notable Iranologists:

- Abdolhossein Zarrinkoub
- Richard N. Frye
- Ehsan Yarshater
- Ahmad Tafazzoli
- Mehrdad Bahar
- Parviz Varjavand

== Sources ==
- Abdi, Kamyar (2007). "A. Shahpur Shahbazi 1942–2006". Iran. 45. Taylor & Francis: v–vi. doi:10.1080/05786967.2007.11864715. S2CID 192304837.
