= Armenian nobility =

Privileged social class in Armenia

The Armenian nobility (Armenian: Հայ ազնվականություն, romanized: hay aznvakanutyun) was a class of persons which enjoyed certain privileges relative to other members of society under the laws and customs of various regimes of Armenia. Governments which recognized or conferred nobility were the Kingdom of Van (860–590 B.C.), Satrapy of Armenia (570–331 B.C.), Kingdom of Armenia (331 B.C. – 428 A.D.), Bagratid Kingdom of Armenia (885–1045) and the Armenian Kingdom of Cilicia (1198–1375). The Armenian kingdoms of Vanand (963–1065), Syunik (987–1170), and Lori (978–1113) had a system of nobility that was similar to the nobility of Cilicia.

== Terminology ==
Members of the upper class of medieval Armenian society were known as nakharars (Armenian: նախարար) and azats (Armenian: ազատ), (also aznvakans (Armenian: ազնվական)).

The roots of Armenian nobility trace back to ancient tribal society, when the proto-Armenian tribes separated from the primordial Indo-European community and selected chieftain leaders for governing the community, defending territory and leading military campaigns against their enemies. These chieftains and leaders were usually the strongest members of the clans and tribes, who had become renowned for their strength, intelligence, and deeds. Thus, gradually the upper class of the Armenian society came into existence, namely that of the azats, also known as aznvakans or aznavurs. Translated from contemporary Armenian the word azat literally means "one who is free", a "freeman".

Armenian noble clans traced their origins either back to the gods of the old Armenian religion or to the heroes and patriarchs of the Armenian people or the origins of non-Armenian families. For example, the noble houses of Vahevuni and Mehnuni were believed to be offspring of Vahagn and Mihr, ancient Armenian deities of fire and war, and heavenly light and justice respectively. The House of Artzruni traced its origins to Sanasar, son of Mher from the Armenian epos Sasna Tzrer. According to the Armenian aristocratic tradition, the princely houses of [Poladian] Khorkhoruni, Bznuni, Mandakuni, Rshtuni, Manavazian, Angelea (Angegh tun), Varajnuni, Vostanikyan, Ohanian, Cartozian, Apahuni, Arran tun and some others, are all believed to be direct descendants of Nahapet (Patriarch) Hayk, whose epithet was Dyutsazn, meaning demigod, or of Hayk's descendants. It is quite common in all parts of the world for members of the nobility to purport to trace their ancestry back to gods, or legendary heroes. Besides that, according to legend the Bagratuni dynasty has origins in Judea, according to Movses Khorenatsi, as they transferred to Armenia in 6th century B.C. The Mamikonyan dynasty also had legends of coming from China.

== Historical origins ==
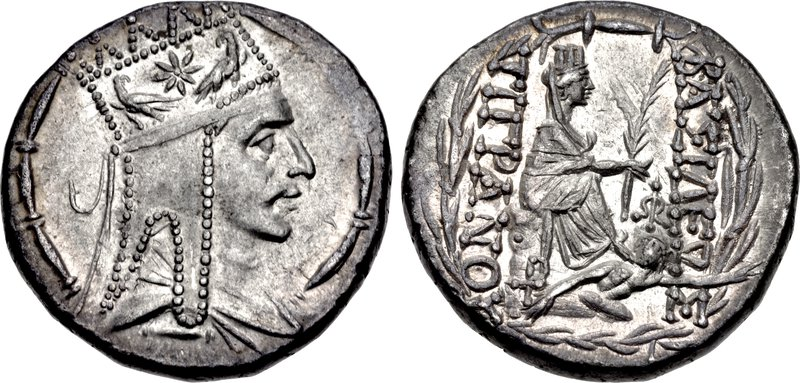
Coin of Tigranes the Great mented in Antioch by Greek scripts reads BAΣIΛEΩ-Σ TIΓPANOY, meaning "King Tigran", The King is depicted wearing Armenian traditional tiara decorated with star between two eagle

The early Armenian historians mention various Armenian noble houses during different periods of Armenian history. Sometimes their number is mentioned to be ninety, yet at other times it reaches up to three hundred. Certainly, the number of the Armenian noble houses did change in the course of time as the aristocratic class was itself subject to flux.

The first attested Armenian royal dynasty was the Orontids (Yervandunis) which was ruling Armenia as a satrapy of the Persian Empire in the 4th century BC. They are preceded by legendary or semi-legendary patriarchs of Armenian tradition, first recorded in the History attributed to Moses of Chorene (Movses Khorenatsi), written circa the 5th century.

Map of Armenia and the Roman client states in eastern Asia Minor, ca. 50 AD, before the Roman-Parthian War and the annexation of the client kingdoms into the Empire

The noble houses of Rshtuni, Mokats, Artzruni and others originated from tribal rulers or clans already in antiquity. Some others, such as the Mamikonians or Aravelians, were granted noble titles and/or offices, such as aspet (Armenian: ասպետ), 'coronator' and sparapet (Armenian: սպարապետ), 'generalissimo' by special decrees of medieval Armenian kings for their services to the royal court or the nation.

Some Armenian Christian historians tend to derive certain Armenian noble houses from Mesopotamian or other roots. For example, in his History of Armenia, Movses Khorenatsi traces the family origins of his sponsor prince Sahak Bagratuni to non-Armenian roots. However, the historical sources prove the existence of the Bagratuni family in the oldest period of Armenian history and speak of them as aboriginal Armenians. The linguistic analysis also maintains that the name Bagarat probably is of Indo-European origin. It is remarkable that Prince Bagratuni himself rejected Khorenatsi's version of the origins of his family. Exotic descents were in vogue among the early medieval Armenian aristocratic families. However, there is no evidence supporting any of these claims of descent.

== Institutions and structure ==
The nobility always played an important role in Armenian society. This is evidenced through the evolution of the term nakharar. Initially this term referred to the hereditary governors of the Armenian provinces and was used with the meaning of "ruler" and "governor". The same title could mean a particularly honorable service (nakhararutyun, nakharardom) at the Armenian royal court. Examples of such heritable services or nakharardoms are aspetutyun (coronation, which traditionally belonged to the house of Bagratuni), sparapetutyun (commander-in-chief of the Armenian army, which traditionally belonged to the house of Mamikonean), hazarapetutyun (chancellery and taxation, which were inheritably managed by the houses of Gnuni and Amatuni), and malhazutyun (royal guard that was traditionally organized and headed to the house of Khorkhoruni). However, in the course of hereditary consolidation of gavars (provinces) or royal court services by noble houses, the term nakharar has changed its original meaning and gradually transformed into a generic equivalent of "aristocrat", "nobleman". Accordingly, the aristocratic families started to be called nakharar houses or nakharardoms. Along with this analysis, there is another interpretation of term nakharar, which is based on Armenian nakh and arar, i.e. "the first created" or "the first borne".

The meaning of term nakharar was evolving in parallel with consolidation of the noble houses' hereditary rights over counties of Great Armenia. For example, the county of Great Albak was traditionally inherited by the noble house of Artzruni, county of Taron by the house of Slkuni, and the county of Rshtuniq by the house of Rshtuni. Even prior to this consolidation the traditional aristocratic emblems and coat-of-arms emerge. The latter often is deeply rooted in the ancient kinship and tribal beliefs and totems of the Armenian clans. Although the information on Armenian heraldry is quite limited, nevertheless it is well known that the most common symbols were those of the eagle, lion, and mountain ram. For example, the coat-of-arms of the Artashesian dynasty consisted of two eagles with the symbol of sun in the middle. An eagle holding a sheep was also the house symbol of Bagratuni nakharardom. The dynastic emblem of the Cilician Armenian royal house of Lusignan (Lusinian) reflected west European heraldic influence and consisted of red lions and crosses on the yellow and blue background of the shield. The nakharar families of ancient Armenia were listed in the so-called Gahnamaks and Zoranamaks, which were the official inventories or registrars that were positioning the families based on the criteria of honor, virtue and esteem. The difference between Gahnamak and Zoranamak were in the listing criteria that were determining the esteem of the noble family. Zoranamak was based on the military strength of the houses, i.e. the number of possessed cavalry and infantry, responsibility in defending the northern, eastern, southern and western borders of Armenia, as well as the size of the troops that the noble houses were placing under the command of the king of Armenia in times of military campaigns. Unlike Zoranamak, Gahnamak listed the noble houses based on the criteria of political and economic importance of the houses, size of their estates, their wealth, as well as their connections and influence over the royal courts.

Two other notions of the Armenian nobility related to Gahnamak and Zoranamak are those of bardz and pativ. Bardz literally means "cushion". It was the seat that was occupied by the head of the noble house at the royal table, be it during council or during festivities. The word bardz derives from these cushions on which the lords of houses were seated on special occasions. Bardz – literally cushioned seats at the royal table but more broadly the actual status at the royal court – were distributed on the basis of pativ, i.e. literally the honor and esteem of the noble houses. The latter, most probably was fixed in Gahnamaks and Zoranamaks.

=== Gahnamak ===
Gahnamak (Armenian: Գահնամակ, literally: "throne registrar") – was an official state document, list of places and thrones (bardz) that the Armenian princes and nakharars were occupying at the royal court of Armenia. The throne of the prince or nakharar was defined by his economic or military strength (according to the Zoranamak, literally: "strength registrar"), as well as according to the ancient tradition. Gahnamak was composed and sealed by the King of Armenia, because the nakharars (lords) were considered to be his vassals. Nakharar thrones (gahs, i.e. the positions at the royal court) were changing rarely and were inherited from father to son. Only in special circumstances – such as high treason, cessation of the family etc. – did the king had the right to make some changes in the Gahnamak. The sequence and classification of Armenian lords' thrones had been defined and observed from the ancient times.

According to Khorenatsi, the first actual listing of lords in the shape of Gahnamak was Armenian King Vologases I (Vagharsh I). According to the recorded sources, the classification of Armenian lords' thrones in the form of Gahnamak existed throughout the reign of Arshakuni (Arsacid) dynasty (1st–5th centuries). The same system was continued during the Marzpanian period in the history of Armenia (5th–7th centuries), i.e. during the supremacy of the Sasanian kings of Persia. There are significant discrepancies and inaccuracies in the data of Gahnamaks of different centuries regarding the number of princely houses and degrees of their thrones. According to the Gahnamak of the 4th century preserved in "The Deeds of Nerses", during the reign of king Arsaces II (Arshak II) (c.350–368) the number of the Armenian aristocratic houses reached 400. However the author of "The Deeds" mentions the family names of only 167 lords, 13 of whom did not have a throne. The author himself explains that he is incapable of listing all of them. Armenian historian of the 13th century Stepanos Orbelian also mentions 400 nakharar thrones, who had "throne and respect" at the royal court of king Trdat III (287–332). Pavstos Buzand mentions 900 princely lords, who carried honorary services at the royal court and who sat on a special throne (gah) or cushion (bardz).

The Gahnamak is believed to have been written by Armenian Catholic Sahak Parthev (387–439), whose surname indicates distant Persian origin from the Parthav or Parthian clan. Sahak Parthev made the registrar available to the Sasanian Persian court, mentioning a total of 70 Armenian nakharars. In another source of the 4th century 86 nakharars were listed. According to the Arab chronologist Yacoubi (9th century) there were 113 lords in the administrative province of Arminiya, whereas another Arab historian, Yacout al-Hamavi (12–13th centuries) the number of Armenian principalities was 118. Armenian historians Agathangelos, Pavstos Buzand, Yeghishe, Lazar Parbetsi, Movses Khorenatsi, Sebeos and others also provided numerous data and information about Armenian princely houses and lords. However, the Gahnamaks and lists of nakharars (princely houses), based on these data and information, remain incomplete.

=== Internal divisions ===
The Armenian nobility were internally divided. The social pyramid of the Armenian nobility was headed by the king, in Armenian arka. The term arka originates from the common Aryan root that has equivalents in the name for monarchs in other Indo-European languages: arxatos in Greek, raja in Indo-Aryan, rex or regnum in Latin, roi in French, and reis in Persian.

The sons of the king, i.e. princes, were called sepuh. The elder son, who was also the crown prince and was called avag sepuh, had a particular role. In the case of king's death the avag sepuh automatically would inherit the crown, unless there were other prior arrangements.

The second layer in the social division of the Armenian nobility was occupied by bdeshkhs. The four bdeshkhs were rulers of large borderland provinces of historical Greater Armenia. They were de facto viceroys and by their privileges were very close to the king. Bdeshkhs had their own armies, taxation and duties system, and could even produce their own coins.

The third layer of the Armenian aristocracy after the king and the bdeshkhs was composed by ishkhans, i.e. princes. The term ishkhan derives from ancient Aryan root xshatriya (warrior-ruler). An ishkhan normally would have a hereditary estate known as hayreniq and residence caste – dastakert. Armenian princely houses (or clans) were headed by tanuter. By its meaning the word tun (house) is very close to tohm (clan). Accordingly, tanuter meant "houselord" or "lord of the clan".

Organizationally, the Armenian nobility was headed by the metz ishkhan ("great ishkhan") or ishkhanats ishkhan ("ishkhan of ishkhans") in Armenian, who in some historical chronicles is also called metzametz. He was the marshal of Armenian nobility and had special privileges and duties. For example, in case of the king's death and if there was no inheriting sepuh (crown prince), it was the metz ishkhan who would temporarily take the responsibilities and perform the duties of the king until the issues of succession to the throne are resolved. In reality, however, the successions to the throne would be arranged in advance or would be resolved in the course of feuds and internal struggle.

Thus, the social pyramid of the nobility of Great Armenia includes the following layers:

- Arka or Tagavor (king)
- Bdeshkh (viceroy)
- Ishkhanats ishkhan (grand duke)
- Ishkhan (prince)

This division, however, reflects the specific tradition of Great Armenia in its early period in history. Naturally, in time the social structure of nobility underwent changes based on the specifics of Armenian territories, historical era, and social relations. For example, in medieval times the names and composition of the nobility of the Armenian Kingdom of Cilicia underwent certain changes:

Great Armenia

- Arka or Tagavor
- Bdeshkh
- Ishkhanats Ishkhan (or Metz Ishkhan)
- Ishkhan

Cilician Armenia

- Tagavor or Inqnakal
- Bdeshkh
- Paronats Paron (or Metz Paron)
- Paron

Cilician Armenia adopted many peculiarities of west European classification of the nobility, such as paron (deriving from "baron"), ter or sinyor (senior), berdater (castle lord) etc. Besides this, in Cilicia Armenian knighthood emerged which was also considered to be part of the nobility despite the fact that knights themselves – called dziavor i hetzelvor – did not always originate from parons.

Some other features also underwent changes. For example, whereas the salutation for the noblemen in Great Armenia was tiar or ter, in Cilician Armenia a new form of salutation was added to these, namely paron. The latter became the most popular form of greeting and gradually changed its meaning to the equivalent of "mister" in modern Armenian.

In late mediaeval Armenia and in the new age a variety of nobility titles existed in different nahangs (provinces) of the country. For example, in Artsakh of the Khamsa period (i.e. period of "five principalities") the title of ishkhan (prince) was used in its local equivalent – that of melik (a 'devaluated' Arabic word for king). Below melik – or sometimes in parallel with it – was the title of yuzbashi (from the Turkish officer rank, literally "lord of the hundred" warriors).

With the annexation of eastern Armenia – i.e. Karabakh, Yerevan, Nakhichevan and Kars provinces – into the Russian Empire, the titles, traditions and social institutions of the Russian nobility become dominant among the Armenian aristocrats as they were integrated into the imperial nobility Russian style.

==== Hereditary titles ====
- Aspet
- Azat
- Ishkhan
- Melik
- Nakharar
- Sparapet
- Tanuter

=== Princely families ===
==== Great Armenia ====
Family name (gavar-county, ashxarh-province)

Incomplete list:
- Abeluni – Abelean – Abeghean
  - (Abeleanq / Abegheanq, Ayrarat)
- Abeluni – Abelean other – Abelean the second
- Adahuni (Mazaz, Ayrarat)
- Alberkatsi – Aghberkatsi
- Alelnadroshn – Agheghnadroshn
- Aknuni – Akeoy – Akeats – Akeatsi – Akean (Ake, Vaspurakan)
- Aldznuni – Aldznats tun – Aghdzn (Aldzn, Aldzniq)
- Alkuni – Aghkuni
- Alnevuni – Alesuni – Aghesuni – Alevan – Aghevan
- Amaskuni
- Amatuni (Artaz, Vaspurakan)
- Amatuni the second
- Andzevatsi (Andzevatsiq, Vaspurakan)
- Andzevatsi other
- Andzit – Andzit tun – Andzteatsi – Andzitoy (Andzit, Tzopq)
- Angel tun – Angegh tun – Angelay (Angelay, Aldzniq)
- Apahuni (Apahuniq, Tauruberan)
- Apahuni other
- Apekuni
- Aqatzi – Aqatzetsi – Aqatzu
- Aragatzean (Aragatzotn, Ayrarat)
- Aramean
- Aran – Arran tun (Great Arranq, Artsakh)
- Aravelean – Arravelean – Aravelian (Vanand-Zarishat, Ayrarat)
- Aravenean – Arravenean – Aravenian
- Arberani – Arberuni – Arberanean – Arshakuni (Arberani, Vaspurakan)
- Arnoy – Arnoy (Arnoyotn, Vaspurakan)
- Arshakuni – Arshakean – Aliovitean (Aliovit, Vaspurakan)
- Arshamuni – Arshmuni (Arshamuniq, Turuberan)
- Arshamuni (Arshamuniq, Tzopq)
- Arsharuni (Arsharuniq, Ayrarat)
- Arshuni
- Artakuni
- Artashatean – Artashamean (Ayrarat)
- Artashisean – Artashesean (Artashiseanq, Vaspurakan)
- Artzruni (Great Albak, Vaspurakan)
- Artzruni the second
- Artzruni the third
- Ashahmarean
- Ashots – Ashotsean (Ashotsq, Ayrarat)
- Ashtortsean – Hashtotsean
- Ashxadarean***
- Ashxagorean
- Aspakuni – Spakowni (Aspakuneats Dzor, Tauruberan)
- Asparaxazn
- Asparuni – Sparuni
- Atrpatuni – Apatuni (Atrpatuniq, Vaspurakan)
- Awatzatsi – Avatzatsi
- Arartuni – Ayraratean (Maseatsotn, Ayrarat)
- Aytruni
- Aytzenakan
- Balasakan
- Bardzruni
- Bagraspuni
- Bagratuni – Aspetuni – Aspetn – Bagraspuni - Bagrevand - Ayrarat
- Bagratuni – Aspetuni – Aspetn – Bagraspuni (Sper, Bardzr Hayq)
- Bagratuni – Aspetuni – Aspetn – Bagraspuni (Tayq)
- Basenoy – Basenean – Basenatsi (Basean, Ayrarat)
- Bjuni – Bjnuni
- Boguni (Boguniq, Vaspurakan)
- Bujuni (Bujuniq, Vaspurakan)
- Buxa Dimaqsean (Tayq)
- Bznuni – Baznuni – Bazauni (Bznuniq, Tauruberan)
- Chighb – Tchighb
- Dashtkaruni – Dashtkarin (Karin, Bardzr Hayq)
- Derjayin – Derjani – Derdzani (Derjan, Bardzr Hayq)
- Dedeyan
- Dimaqsean – Dimaksian – Dimaksyan (Tayq)
- Dimaqsean (Shirak, Ayrarat)
- Dimaqsean other
- Droshakirn
- Dziunakan – Dzyunakan – Dziwnakan – Paluni (Dziunakanq / Paluniq, Tauruberan)
- Dzolkert – Dzoghkertn
- Dzorabnakean
- Gabeluni – Gabelean – Gabeghean – Gabeuni (Gabeleanq / Gabegheanq, Ayrarat)
- Gabitean – Gabithian (Gabiteanq, Vaspurakan)
- Gamrean (Gamirq)
- Gardmanay – Gardmanats – Gardmanits (Utiq)
- Gargaratsi
- Gavarapetn – Gavarapetn
- Gazrikean – Gazrikian (Gazrikeanq, Vaspurakan)
- Gelamean (Gegharquniq, Siuniq)
- Gison – Gisanean – Gisanian
- Gnthuni (Nig, Ayrarat)
- Gnthuni the second
- Gnuni (Aliovit-Zarishat, Tauruberan)
- Gogarats – Gugaratsi (Gugarq)
- Goltan – Goghtan – Goghtnats – Golthnatsi (Goghtn, Vaspurakan)
- Gowkean – Gukan (Gukan, Vaspurakan)
- Grchuni – Grtzchuni
- Gushar
- Haduni
- Hamazguni
- Hambujean – Hamutsean – Hambujian
- Harqean – Harqian (Harq, Tauruberan)
- Hashtuni – Ashtishatean (Tauruberan)
- Hashtuni – Hashteits – Hashtean (Hashteanq, Tzophq)
- Havnuni (Havnuniq, Ayrarat)
- Haykazuni – Haykazean (Harq / Arq, Tauruberan)
- Herheruni – Heruni (Her, Parskahayq)
- Kadmean
- Kamsarakan (Shirak, Ayrarat)
- Karqayin
- Karthuni – Karthean – Korthean (Kartuniq, Kortchayq)
- Kaspuni – Kazb – Kaspetsi – Kaspats (Paytaqaran)
- Kazmuni – Kazbuni
- Kananatsi
- Klznuni – Kghznuni – Kghzuni
- Klundi – Kghundi
- Koghovtuni – Koghovtean – Kolovtean (Koghovit, Ayrarat)
- Korduats – Korduatsots – Kordvatsi (Kortchayq)
- Krtchuni (Krtchuniq, Vaspurakan)
- Kruni – Kruni
- Lekandrean
- Lernakan – Lernakan
- Mahkert tun (Kortchayq)
- Malxazuni – Malxazn – Malxazean – Maxean (Her, Parskahayq)
- Mamikonean – Mamikonian (Tayq)
- Mamikonean – Mamikonian (Taron, Tauruberan)
- Manavazean (Manavazeanq, Tauruberan)
- Mandakuni (Mandakuniq / Arshamuniq, Tauruberan)
- Mardaxean – Mardalean – Mardaghean
- Mardpetuni – Mardpetn – Mardpetakan – Hayruni (Mardastan, Vaspurakan)
- Maxaluni – Mashxaluni
- Maznuni – Mazkeni – Mazazatsi (Mazaz, Ayrarat)
- Mehnuni
- Mehruni – Mihruni
- Melik-Babakhanyan
- Melik-Barkhudar
- Metznuni (Artchishatovit-Metznuniq, Vaspurakan)
- Mlruni – Mghruni – Mxruni
- Mokats – Mokatsi (Mokq)
- Molean – Moloean (Karin, Bardzr Hayq)
- Mruni
- Muatsean – Msatsean
- Muratsan – Maratswots – Maratsean (Vaspurakan?)
- Namakuni
- Naxtcheri
- Netoghn
- Norberuni
- Paluni – Palnay tun (Paluniq, Tzopq)
- Paluni (Paluniq, Vaspurakan)
- Paluni the second
- Parspatuni – Parspuni – Parsparuni (Parspatuniq, Vaspurakan)
- Perejuni
- Pharatchuni – Ratchuni
- Pokayuni
- Qalaqapetn – Qaghaqapetn – Qalaqapetn arquni
- Qajberuni (Artchesh gavar, Turuberan)
- Qavpetuni – Qamuni – Qaypetuni
- Qolean – Qalean – Qaghean – Qaluni, Qalay tun – Goshean (Qal?, Aldzniq)
- Rapsonean – Ropsean – Aropsuni (Naxijevan, Vaspurakan)
- Razmuni – Razmuni
- Rmbosean – Rmbosean
- Rshtuni – Rshtuni – Arshtuni (Rshtuniq, Vaspurakan)
- Rshtuni the second
- Sagrasuni
- Saharuni
- Sahuni – Shahuni (Sahuniq, Tzopq)
- Saluni – Salnoy tun (Saluniq, Aldzniq)
- Sanasuni – Sasnay (Sasun, Aldzniq)
- Sasanean
- Shahapuni
- Shahorapetn – Shahakhorapet arquni
- Sharaean (Shirak, Ayrarat)
- Sisakean – Sisakan – Sisanean (Sisian, Siuniq)
- Siuni – Syuni – Syunetsi (Siuniq / Syuniq)
- Siuni the second – Syuneats the second
- Slkuni – Sikluni – Slakuni – Sulkuni (Taron, Tauruberan)
- Spanduni (Spanduniq, Paytakaran)
- Sruni – Suruni
- Srvandztean – Srwandztean
- Tamberatsi – Mamberatsi (Tamber, Parskahayq)
- Tashiroy – Tashratsi – Tashrats (Tashirq, Gugarq)
- Tashiroy – Tashratsi – Tashrats (Tashir / Tashirq, Lori, Ayrarat)
- Taygrean (Taygreanq, Vaspurakan)
- Tayots – Tayetsi (Tayq)
- Tharmuni
- Tchitchraketsi – Chichraketsi
- Thruni – Truni
- Tlquni – Tlqean – Mlqean?
- Torosean
- Tphxuni
- Trpatuni – Treypatuni – Tirpatuni – Trdatuni (Trpatuniq, Vaspurakan)
- Tsuln
- Turberanean (Tauruberan)
- Tushuni – Tushkuni
- Tzalkuni – Tzghkuni (Tzaghkotn, Ayrarat)
- Tzavdeatsi – Tzawdeatsi – Sawdetsi (Sotq, Siuniq)
- Tzaythiuni
- Tzopats – Tzophuni (Tzopq)
- Urtza – Urtzetsi – Urtzi (Urtz / Urtzadzor, Ayrarat)
- Uteats – Uteatsi (Utiq)
- Vagraspuni
- Vahevuni – Vahnuni – Vahuni – Vahuneats (Vahevuniq, Tauruberan)
- Vahevuni the second
- Vanandatsi – Vananday – Vanandoy – Vanandian (Vanand, Ayrarat)
- Vanandatsi the second
- Varajnuni (Varajnuniq, Ayrarat)
- Varajnuni – Varaznuni (Varajnuniq, Tauruberan)
- Varajnuni – Varaznuni (Varajnuniq, Vaspurakan)
- Varaspakean
- Varazatakean – Varazean
- Vardzavuni (Vardzavuniq, Gugarq)
- Vaykuni (Vaykuniq, Artsakh)
- Vijanuni – Vijuni – Vijani (Vijanuniq, Bardzr Hayq)
- Virats – Virakan
- Vorduni – Worduni (Vorduniq, Vaspurakan)
- Vorduni (Basean-Vorduniq, Ayrarat)
- Vorsapetn – Vorsapetn arquni
- Voskemani
- Vostanikyan (Vostanikean, Ostanikean, Vaspurakan)
- Vrnjuni – Vrnjnuni
- Vtchenits tun – Vtchenits
- Xordzean – Xortchean – Xordzenits – Xoreni (Xordzeanq, Tzopq)
- Xorxoruni – Khorkhoruni (Xorxoruniq / Khorkhoruniq, Tauruberan)
- Xorxoruni the second
- Yedesean – Edesian
- Yerevaray – Yerewaray (Yerevarq, Tauruberan)
- Yermanthuni
- Yervanduni (Yervanduniq – Hayots Dzor, Vaspurakan)
- Yntzay – Yntzayetsi – Yntzayeni – Andzakhi (Vaspurakan)
- Zarehavanean (Zarehavan, Parskahayq)
- Zarehuni (=Zarehavanean?)

==== Armenian Kingdom of Cilicia ====
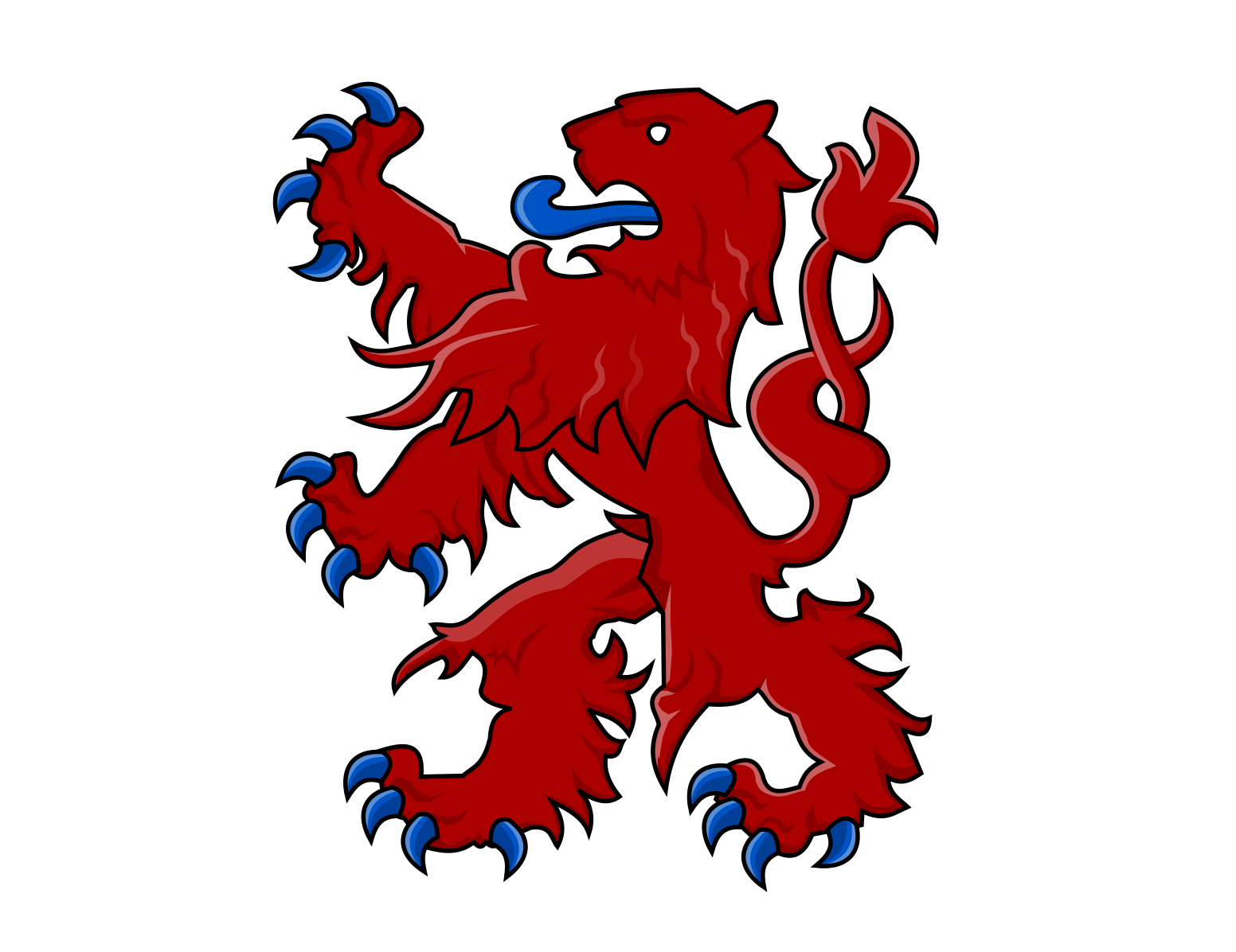
Emblem of the Rubenid royal family

Emblem of the Hetumian royal family

Incomplete list:

- Hetumian
- Lusinian (Lusignan)
- Rubinian

==== Princely families of late medieval Armenia ====
Incomplete list:

- Amatuni
- Aran tun
- Aranshahik (founded 9th century)
- Artsruni
- Artzruni-Mahkanaberdci (princes of Mahkanaberd)
- Artzruni-Kogovit (princes of Kogovit)
- Bagratuni
- Dopian (11th–16th centuries) (meliks of Tzar or Upper Khachen)
- Dedeyan (princes of Armenia)
- Kiurikian
- Orbelian (princes of Siunik)
- Pahlavuni (princes of Aragatzotn)
- Tornikian
- Vachutian
- Vakhtangian (meliks of Haterk or Central Khachen)
- Xaghbakian-Proshian (princes of Bjni, Garni, Geghard, Noravank)
- Zakarian (princes of Armenia)

==== Melikdoms (Principalities) of Eastern Armenia ====
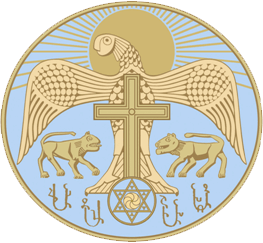
Flag of the Hasan-Jalalian family

Incomplete list:

- Meliks of Barsum (Utik)
- Meliks of Getashen (Utik)
- Meliks of Khachakap (Utik)
- Meliks of Voskanapat (Utik)
- 11 melik houses (Syunik)

Including Melik-Vardavantsi (Tutundjian de Vartavan, Tutundjian) from Vardavan[K], Baghk. A branch of the Meliks of Syunik/Karabagh. Later beys under Fuad Ist and Faruk IInd of Egypt, also bey & consul of Nader Shah of Iran.

Incomplete list:

(15th–19th centuries)

- Melik Hasan-Jalalian (meliks of Khachen before 1755)
- Melik-Avanian
- Melik-Mirzakhanian (meliks of Khachen-Khndzristan after 1755)
- Melik-Shakhnazarian (meliks of Varanda)
- Melik-Beglarian (meliks of Gulistan)
- Melik-Israelian (meliks of Jraberd before 1783)
- Melik-Alaverdian (meliks of Jraberd in 1783 – 1814)
- Melik Atabekian (meliks of Jraberd since 1814)

==== 18th century Armenia ====
Incomplete list:

- Amatuni
- Argutian – Argutinskiy-Dolgorukiy
- Bagratuni – Bagration
- Dadian – Տատէան
- Dedeyan – Տէտէեան
- Ekserdjian
- Lazarian – Lazarev
- Loris-Melikian – Loris-Melikov (meliks of Lori)
- Medadian – Madatov
- Melikian – Melikov
- Melik-Shahnazarian (meliks of Gegharquniq)
- Melik-Vrtanesian
- Smbatian – Sumbatian

== Fate and the present state ==
Many Armenian aristocratic families perished during wars with foreign invaders, notably Arabs and Turks. The latter quickly realized that the Armenian state was based on the national aristocracy and thus adopted policies of annihilation of the Armenian nobility. For example, in 705 the Ostikan (governor under the Arab caliphate) of Armenia deceitfully invited around 800 Armenian noblemen together with their guards to Nakhichevan as if for negotiations and massacred them all. Nevertheless, some Armenian noble houses lived through this tragedy and continued their efforts to liberate the country. Some descendants of the Armenian nobility achieved high-ranking positions at foreign royal courts. For example, the offspring of the Armenian noble house of Artzruni became influential grandees at the Georgian court. The Georgian branch of the Armenian noble family of Bagratuni was enthroned as Bagrationi and became the reigning house in Georgia. An entire line of noblemen of Armenian descent reigned in Byzantium. As a result of dynastic marriages, the descendants of the Armenian royal house of Lusignan (Lusinian), a Frankish family who came to the Near East in the Crusades, once ruling over Cilicia and Cyprus, merged with the representatives of the west European royal dynasty of Savoy reigning in parts of Italy. The offspring of some nakharar houses founded new medieval Armenian aristocratic houses, such as the Cartozians, Proshians, Kyurikians, Orbelians, Hasan Jalalyans, Artsrunis and Tornikians among others. These dynasties played a significant role in the struggle for the liberation of Armenia and the revival of Armenian statehood. In the 13th century particularly prominent were the Mkhargrdzeli princes – brothers Zakare and Ivane – whose military strength and political influence in the united Armenian-Georgian state was so significant that they were de facto the fully-fledged rulers of the Armenian territories. The last strongholds of Armenian statehood were preserved by the semi-dependent princes (meliks) of Karabakh-Artsakh, also known as melikdoms of Khamsa (from Arabic word meaning "five principalities). These principalities preserved their status until the annexation of eastern Armenia into the Russian Empire. The Russian emperors either accepted the noble titles of the Armenian aristocracy or themselves elevated prominent representatives of Armenian origin in an effort to use the potential of the Armenian nobility. During this period the noble houses of Madatian (Madatov), Lazarian (Lazarev), Beybutian (Beybutov), Pirumyan (Pirumov), Loris-Melikian (Loris-Melikov) emerged.

The aristocratic tradition in Armenia suffered another blow during the Bolshevik regime, when the nobility was dissolved as a social class and the noblemen underwent systematic oppression. Many representatives of the Armenian aristocracy were repressed, sentenced to prisons and work camps, or simply executed. Those who survived against all odds were forced to hide their aristocratic origins by changing family names and obliterating their family histories. Only a very few managed to preserve their family traditions by leaving the Communist regime and moving to other countries.

== Steps toward revival ==
With the end of the Communist regime and independence of Armenia in 1991, important steps were made to revive the traditions of the Armenian nobility. In October 1992 the Union of the Armenian Noblemen (UAN) was created and registered in Armenia. On 27 July 2012, another nobility association – the Meliq Union – was registered by the Ministry of Justice of Armenia. Both associations are registered as a public non-governmental organization.

Together, these nobility association have around 450 members representing aristocratic houses of Armenia. Membership in these unions is open to descendants of old and new Armenian noble families, as well as to the foreign titled nobility that reside in Armenia and abroad, regardless their political or religious views, and age and sex. They conduct their activities in accordance with their Charters, the Constitution and legislation of Armenia, and international law. The main goals of these nobility unions are:

- Restoration of the Armenian nobility and its past role and significance in the society and the state;
- Reinstatement of the best traditions of the Armenian nobility and reestablishment of criteria for the noblemen's honor, morals and ethics;
- Restoration of the heraldry of the noble dynasties and their genealogy;
- Gathering, storing and scientific systemization of archival materials, research in the history of the Armenian nobility and specific dynasties;
- Presentation of the history of Armenian nobility and dynasties, families and their ancestors to the general public through the mass media and public lectures.

== Bibliography ==
- Abrahamian, Rafael; The Armenian Knighthood (4th–6th centuries). Armyanskiy Vestnik, #1–2, 1999.
- The Armenian Encyclopedia. Yerevan, Haykakan Hanragitaran, 1977–1979.
- Basmadjian, Krikor Jacob (1914). "Chronologie de l'histoire d'Arménie". Revue de l'Orient chrétien (in French). IX (XIX): 293–294.
- Bedrosian, Robert; The Turco-Mongol Invasions and the Lords of Armenia in the 13–14th Centuries. New York, Columbia University, 1979 thesis.
- Draskhanakerttsi, Hovhannes; The History of Armenia. Yerevan, Sovetakan Grogh, 1984.
- Khorenatsi, Movses; The History of Armenia. Yerevan, Hayastan, 1990, ISBN 5-540-01084-1.
- Matevosian, Rafael; On the Question of the Origins of the Bagratides. Armyanskiy Vestnik, 1–2, 2001.
- Petrosov, Aleksander; The Lions, the Crown and the Present Day. Noyev Kovcheg, #7 (65), August 2003.
- Pirumyan, Grand Duke Gevorg; The Union of the Armenian Nobility. An interview to Vasn Hayutyan, #2, 2003.
- Raffi. The Melikdoms of Khamsa. Yerevan, Nairi, 1991.
- Sukiasian, Aleksey G.; The History of the Cilician Armenian State and Law (11th–14th centuries). Yerevan, Mitq, 1969.
- Ter-Ghazarian, Romen; The Armenians on the Byzantine Throne. Electronic publication: www.armenia.ru, 2003.
