= Sanesan's invasion of Armenia (335–336) =

Sanesan invasion of Armenia (335–336)
- Part of Maskute invasions of Armenia
Date	335–336
Location	Kingdom of Armenia
Result	Armenian victory

Belligerents
Maskut tribe	Arsacid dynasty of Armenia

Commanders and leaders
Sanesan †	Khosrov III the Small; Vache I Mamikonian

The Sanesan invasion of Armenia was a military conflict fought c. 335–336 between the Kingdom of Armenia, ruled by King Khosrov III the Small, and a coalition led by Sanesan, the Arsacid king of the Maskut.

Following the death of Tiridates III of Armenia, Sanesan—also identified in some historical sources as Sanatruk—took advantage of the succession crisis to advance his claims. He formed an alliance with the Alans and the Caucasian Albanians, assembling a diverse force that included these allies, nomadic groups such as the Huns, and various Caucasian peoples.

Sanesan claimed the Armenian throne through his Arsacid lineage, which he shared with the Armenian royal house.

== Background ==
An Arsacid king—identified as Sanesan by the historian Faustus of Byzantium and as Sanatruk by Movses Khorenatsi—led an invasion of Armenia around 335–336 AD. He ruled the Maskut, a people located along the Caspian coast. Although both Faustus and Khorenatsi describe the same invasion against King Khosrov III (r. c. 330–339), they provide different explanations for its cause.

Khorenatsi connects the invasion to the martyrdom of Grigoris, the grandson of Gregory the Illuminator. In his version, Sanatruk, a distant Arsacid relative of King Tiridates III, was tasked with escorting Grigoris on a mission to the land of the Maskut. Upon hearing a false report of the Armenian king's death, Sanatruk murdered Grigoris and sought to claim the throne.

By contrast, Faustus presents Sanesan as a foreign aggressor rather than a traitor within Armenia. He does not link the invasion to Grigoris, but instead portrays it as a political and military undertaking instigated by the Sasanian emperor Shapur II. Faustus also notes the distant Arsacid kinship between Sanesan and the Armenian royal house, emphasising that he belonged to a separate branch of the dynasty without a legitimate claim to the Armenian throne.

According to both accounts, the invasion began with the capture of Paytakaran, an Armenian-controlled province on the Caspian coast that served as the coalition's staging ground.

== Invasion ==
In c. 335, Sanesan launched a large-scale invasion of Armenia, plundering territories from the Roman frontier city of Satala to the region of Ganjak. The occupation lasted for about a year and forced King Khosrov III and the head of the Armenian Church, Catholicos Vrtanes I, to take refuge in the fortress of Darewnk.

The Armenian sparapet (commander-in-chief), Vache Mamikonean, who had been in the Roman Empire, returned to raise an army. He launched a surprise dawn attack on the main enemy camp at a site called Mt. C'low Glowx ("Bull's Head"), inflicting a decisive defeat on the coalition forces. Mamikonean then advanced to the Ayrarat plain, where he surprised a contingent of the invaders in the capital city of Vagharshapat. The enemy retreated to the rocky terrain near the fortress of Oshakan, where a major battle took place.

In the engagement at Oshakan, Sanesan was killed. Other Armenian commanders—including Bagrat Bagratuni, Garegin Rshtuni, Vahan Amatuni (nahapet, or hereditary lord, of the Amatuni house), and Varaz Kaminakan—joined the campaign to rout the remaining forces of the coalition. Following the battle, Sanesan's head was presented to King Khosrov.

An alternative version is provided by the historian Movses Kaghankatvatsi, who attributes Sanesan's death to Vahan Amatuni, in whose domain of Oshakan the final battle was fought. The more widely cited narrative, centering the victory on Vache Mamikonean, is derived from the account of Faustus of Byzantium, which some scholars argue reflects a pro-Mamikonian bias.
