= Principality of Taron =

Armenian state

The Armenian principality of Taron under the Bagratunis was established in 830 by Prince Bagarat. Taron was originally a domain of the Mamikonian noble house but gradually passed into the hands of the Bagratunis during the 8th century. After Bagarat was taken prisoner by the Arabs and died in Baghdad, his principality was inherited by his son Ashot; following Ashot's death (878), it passed to David-Arkayik, and subsequently to the latter's son, Ashot. During the reign of Emperor Constantine Porphyrogenitus, the ruler of Taron was Grigor, succeeded upon his death by his two sons, Bagarat and Ashot. During this period, Tornik—the paternal uncle of the aforementioned brothers—ruled over a portion of Taron and "bequeathed" his domains to Byzantium. Bagarat and Ashot were also compelled to do the same, and in 966, the Byzantine Empire took possession of all of Taron, thereby eliminating Armenian rule there.

== Geographical Location ==
The Principality of Taron encompassed a vast territory. Its borders extended to the shores of Lake Van in the east and reached the Byzantine Empire in the west. To the west, the principality included Hashtyank, with Ashmushat—stretching further west—serving as its frontier region. North of Ashmushat, the districts of Khordzyan and Mananaghi were also part of the Principality of Taron, bordering the region of Karin. This area held particular strategic importance during the centuries-long military conflicts between the Arabs and the Byzantines. To the north of Taron, the southern parts of Arsharunik also fell within the domain of the Bagratuni princes. The opportunities for Taron's political and territorial expansion were limited; it faced threats from Byzantium in the west, the Arab principality of Arzni in the south, and Arab tribes settled along the shores of Lake Van in the east. During the period of Arab rule, the Principality of Taron was part of the Fourth Armenia administrative district—within the *ostikanate* (governorship) of Arminiya of the Arab Caliphate—which extended westward to the zone of Arab-Byzantine frontier fortifications, or the so-called "sughur".

== Taron under the Rule of the Mamikonyans ==
As early as the 5th century, the vast province of Taron constituted—almost in its entirety—a "nakharar" principality ruled by a branch of the Mamikonyan family. This principality of Taron endured for a long time (until 966). Although there were periods when foreign conquerors abolished the principality, such situations were short-lived, and the principality was subsequently restored and continued to exist. The Mamikonyans ruled the region until the 8th century. However, following the suppression of the popular liberation uprising of 774–775, the Mamikonyans—who had actively participated in it—suffered such a severe blow that, from the second half of the 8th century onwards, they ceased to play a major role in Armenia's political life. A change in the ruling dynasty of Taron ensued: power gradually passed from the weakened Mamikonyans to the Bagratunis of Taron.

== The Principality of Taron under the Bagratunis ==
The Bagratuni principality of Taron, located in the southwest of the Armenian Kingdom, attained autonomy at an early stage. The ancient Taron province of the Mamikonyans became a possession of the Bagratuni house as early as the time of Ashot Msaker; his son, Bagrat, was the first Bagratuni prince of Taron—as well as the Prince of Princes of Georgia and Aghvank—who succeeded his father in 826 and was captured and taken to Samarra, the capital of the Arab Caliphate, by Yusuf al-Marwazi in 851 for leading an anti-caliphate rebellion․ Bagarat Bagratuni, a representative of the Taron Bagratunis, was already the lord of Taron by 826, the same year he received the title "Prince of Princes of Armenia." Under the rule of Bagarat Bagratuni (824–851), the principality of Taron encompassed a vast territory. In addition to Taron, it encompassed Sasun, Khut, and the city of Khlat along with its surrounding areas․ Situated directly adjacent to the Caliphate's core territories, this principality bore the initial brunt of the punitive expeditions organized by the Caliphate to suppress popular liberation uprisings in Armenia. Following the restoration of political independence in Armenia, the Principality of Taron became a subject of contention between the Bagratunis of Shirak and the Artsrunis of Vaspurakan. Overall, however, the extensive Principality of Taron fell within the Kingdom of Ani-Shirak, while enjoying considerable autonomy. Bordering the Arab Emirate of Arzni (or Aghdznik), the Principality of Taron was compelled to wage a fierce struggle against it, as the latter sought to eliminate the Taron principality and annex it to its own domain. Yet, in the broader context of the country's life, this conflict was merely a passing phase. During the last quarter of the 9th century and throughout the 10th century, the Principality of Taron experienced a period of peace, allowing all sectors of its economy to flourish. During this time, Mush developed into a well-organized and prosperous city. Its status was further elevated by the fact that it served as the administrative center of the principality. Numerous market towns and settlements emerged; animal husbandry thrived in the mountainous regions of Sasun and Khut, while agriculture flourished in the Mush plain. Trade and the exchange of goods intensified between the plains of Mush and the highlands of Sasun and Khut. The Principality of Taron maintained commercial ties with other parts of Armenia, as well as with Byzantium and Mesopotamia․ During Grigor's time, the Catholicos of All Armenians, Hovhannes V Draskhanakerttsi, took refuge in Taron. Armenian statehood was facing dire and difficult circumstances at the time; Smbat I had been condemned to death, and the country was being subjected to widespread devastation. Byzantium sought to capitalize on Armenia's precarious situation. Patriarch Nicholas Mystikos of Constantinople wrote to the Catholicos, proposing a joint Armenian-Georgian struggle against the Arabs pending Byzantine assistance. The Catholicos received the Patriarch's letter while in Georgia. From there, he traveled to Taron and wrote to Constantine Porphyrogenitus, requesting his aid. The emperor sent his envoy, Theodorus, to Taron to escort Ashot II and Hovhannes Draskhanakerttsi to the capital for negotiations. Only the king departed for Constantinople, whereas the Catholicos, as previously mentioned, avoided meeting the Byzantines, fearing accusations of leaning towards Chalcedonianism.

Following Bagrat's capture in 851, his sons—Ashot and David, who had rebelled in Taron—were taken prisoner; however, in 858, they were released alongside other princes and returned to Taron. Ashot became the presiding prince of Taron, having received the title of *Kuropalates* from the Empire. In 878, Prince Derenik of the Artsruni dynasty took him captive due to intrigue and installed his own brother, David Arkayik—who was the husband of Derenik's sister, Mariam—in his place. With the establishment of the Bagratuni Kingdom, Taron remained one of the principalities subject to it and an integral part of the realm, as the ruling princes were kinsmen of the royal house. In 895, Gurgen—the son of David's brother Ashot—became the prince. However, that same year, he was killed by Ahmad Shaybani, the ruler of Aghdznik, who subsequently conquered all of Taron. In 898, King Smbat launched a war against Ahmad to defend the rights of the legitimate heir, Ashot (son of David). Ahmad died that same year, and the former rulers regained power in Taron. During this period, conflicts arose among the princes of Taron; Grigorik—a cousin of Ashot, son of David—took David and his brother captive and proclaimed himself Prince of Taron. Grigorik established an independent position, refusing to submit to King Smbat of Armenia, and cultivated friendly relations with both the Byzantine emperor and the Caliph of Baghdad․

Concerned for the safety of Ashot Bagratuni and his brother—who had fallen captive to Grigorik—King Smbat appealed to Emperor Leo, requesting his intervention to secure the two brothers' release. Emperor Leo dispatched Kostandin to Taron bearing lavish gifts. Upon his return, Kostandin took Grigorik's son, Ashot, back to Constantinople and sent him to his father. On a subsequent mission, the imperial envoy brought the brother of the Lord of Taron—Apughanem—and the two sons of David Arkayik back to the capital. Kostandin visited Taron a third time, this time taking the Lord of Taron, Grigorik, with him. Grigorik was granted high titles and an annual stipend, as well as a palace in Constantinople known as the "House of the Barbarian." However, these friendly visits were merely a facade; the Byzantine emperor harbored other plans. Soon, the emperor granted the "Barbaros estate" to Grigorik's brother. After Romanos Lekapenos became co-emperor (920–944), Grigorik appealed to him and received an estate in the Yekeghyats region in exchange for the "Barbaros estate." A rift developed between the households of Grigorik and his brother, Apughanem. Apughanem's son, Thornik, complained to the emperor about this decision, pointing out that the "Barbaros estate" had been granted to his father and that Grigorik had no right to exchange it for another property. Romanos Lekapenos ruled that, in lieu of an annual salary, Grigorik would receive gifts. Grigorik opposed this; the emperor abolished the stipend entirely, contenting himself with summoning Grigorik's son, Ashot, to Constantinople and bestowing the title of *patrikios* upon him. After Grigorik's death, Thornik recovered the "Barbaros estate" from the emperor and received the title of *patrikios*. The Principality of Taron was now divided into two parts: one held by Grigorik's sons, Bagrat and Ashot, and the other by Thornik, the son of Apughanem. In 940, the Hamdanid Sayf al-Dawla campaigned in Armenia, passing through the region of Khlat before entering Taron; he ravaged the lands of Bagrat (son of Grigor) and destroyed an Armenian church in the city of Mush. Sayf al-Dawla entered the territory of Sasun, wresting it from Ashot and seizing the fortresses of Khup and Sulayman along with their surrounding areas. Ashot ruled until 966/67; following his death, the Empire carried out its long-standing plan and annexed Taron. According to the Byzantine historian Cedrenus, Grigor and Bagrat—the sons of the late Ashot—"ceded" Taron to the Empire, receiving the rank of *patrikios* and landed estates in return. After the death of Constantine Porphyrogenitus (959), Byzantium intensified its pressure on Ashot, and following the latter's death (967), it set out to conquer Taron․However, Byzantium did not succeed in fully conquering Taron. The lowland area was conquered, and Levon was appointed as its governor, whereas Mountainous Sasun remained an independent principality, closely linked to the Artsruni dynasty of Vaspurakan and the Kingdom of Armenia․

In 966, the Byzantine Empire conquered the Principality of Taron and put an end to its internal autonomy. Following its annexation by Byzantium, the provinces of Derjan, Mananaghi, Hashtyank, and Paghnatun were incorporated into the Principality of Taron. Taron became merely one of the empire's administrative units; however, Sasun and Khut were included in this administrative unit only nominally, as they effectively continued to maintain their own internal autonomous systems․

== The Uprising of 850–855 ==
In the first half of the 9th century, the Bagratuni principality of Taron was one of the most powerful state entities in Armenia and served as the center of the massive anti-Arab uprising of 850–855. The Caliphate exacted brutal retribution, targeting the population of this principality above all others. Bagarat Bagratuni, the Prince of Taron—who never returned to Armenia—along with his sons Ashot and David Bagratuni and Hovnan of Khut, were arrested and sent into exile. During the period between the captivity of the Taron princes and their return, Gurgen Apupelch Artsruni was the sole influential political figure in the southern regions of Armenia. Through his efforts, the Arabs who had established themselves in Vaspurakan were driven out, and Bugha was compelled to recognize Gurgen Apupelch's authority over the region. Judging by the accounts of Tovma Artsruni, the influence of Gurgen Apupelch during that period extended beyond Vaspurakan to Taron as well. The suppression of the rebellion proved disastrous for the Principality of Taron; Arab tribes, having settled in the borderlands of Taron, hampered its ties with other Armenian political entities and frequently threatened its very existence. During this same period, the Byzantine Empire, by undertaking active measures, also posed a threat to the Principality of Taron from the west. Following the suppression of the rebellion, the Bagratunis of Taron were effectively sidelined from active participation in Armenia's political life, ceding the title of "Prince of Armenia" to the branch of the Bagratuni dynasty ruling in northern Armenia. In 858, Ashot and David—the sons of Bagarat Bagratuni, who had returned to their homeland after being released from Arab captivity—established themselves in their hereditary domains in Taron. Ashot Bagratuni became the presiding prince of Taron (858–878). In historical sources, he is known as the Prince of Armenia and "kouropalates"․
