= Bznuni =

The Bznunis (Armenian: Բզնունի) were a noble family (nakharars) in ancient Armenia. They held the district north and west of Lake Van, which shared its name: Bznunik. They were eradicated during the reign of King Khosrov III (r. c. 330 – 338) after their clan head, Databen, betrayed the king and allowed a Sasanian army into Armenia.

== History ==
According to the old Armenian historian Movses Khorenatsi, the Bznunis were descended from Baz, a grandson of Hayk, the legendary progenitor of the Armenian nation. In Cyril Toumanoff's view, this attribution "in this case signifies Urartian—probably royal—origin." Khorenatsi writes that they received their status as magnates (nakharars) from the Armenian king Vagharshak. According to the Zoranamak (a list of the size of the military forces of each Armenian noble house), the Bznunis provided 3,000 cavalrymen to the Crown. They held the district north and west of Lake Van, which shared its name: Bznunik. Lake Van was usually called "the Sea of Bznunik" (Bznuneatsʼ tsov) in medieval Armenian sources.

According to Khorenatsi, after the death of King Tiridates III of Armenia (AD 330) the Bznunis fought against two other noble families, the Manavazians and the Ordunis, leading to their mutual destruction. During the reign of Tiridates' successor Khosrov III (r. c. 330 – 338), the patriarch of the Bznuni family, Databen, betrayed the king and allowed a Sasanian army into Armenia. After the victory of the Armenian forces led by the sparapet (commander-in-chief) Vache Mamikonian, Databen was executed, his house was annihilated, and its holdings were seized and granted to the bishop Albianos. The name of the family survived in that of the district of Bznunik, and there are occasional anachronistic references to the house in some Armenian sources. The Bznuni lands are mentioned as property of the Catholicos, the head of the Armenian Church. Bishops of Bznunik appear at the councils of Artaxata (AD 450) and Dvin (AD 505 and 550). Alternatively, Toumanoff asserts that the Bznuni lands passed first to the Rshtuni and later, in the AD seventh century, to the Mamikonians.

== Sources ==
- Garsoïan, Nina (1997). "The Aršakuni Dynasty". In Hovannisian, Richard G. (ed.). The Armenian People from Ancient to Modern Times. Vol. 1. New York: St. Martin's Press. ISBN 0-312-10169-4.
- Garsoïan, Nina G. (1989). The Epic Histories Attributed to Pʻawstos Buzand (Buzandaran Patmutʻiwnkʻ). Cambridge, Massachusetts: Harvard University Press. ISBN 0-674-25865-7.
- Moses Khorenatsʻi (2006) [Orig. published 1978]. History of the Armenians. Translation and commentary by Robert W. Thomson (Revised ed.). Ann Arbor: Caravan Books. ISBN 978-0-88206-111-5.
- Simonian, Abel, ed. (1976). "Bznuniner" Բզնունիներ. Haykakan sovetakan hanragitaran Հայկական սովետական հանրագիտարան [Armenian Soviet Encyclopedia] (in Armenian). Vol. 2. Erevan: Haykakan hanragitarani glkhavor khmbagrutʻyun. pp. 428–429.
- Toumanoff, Cyril (1963). Studies in Christian Caucasian History. Washington, D.C.: Georgetown University Press. OCLC 505712128.
- Yeremian, Suren (1984). "Paykʻar Mets Haykʻi tʻagavorutʻyan ankakhutʻyan hamar" Պայքար Մեծ Հայքի թագավորության անկախության համար [Struggle for the independence of the Kingdom of Greater Armenia]. In Yeremian, Suren; et al. (eds.). Hay zhoghovrdi patmutʻyun Հայ ժողովրդի պատմություն [History of the Armenian People] (in Armenian). Vol. 2. Erevan: HSSH GA hratarakchʻutʻyun. pp. 81–110.
