= Union of the Armenian Noblemen =

The Union of Armenian Noblemen (UAN) is an organization of a few hundred descendants of Armenian Noble houses.

== History ==
During the Russian Empire period the noble houses of Madatian (Madatov), Lazarian (Lazarev), Beybutian (Beybutov), Pirumyan (Pirumov), and Loris-Melikian (Loris-Melikov) emerged as significant names in Armenian Oblast and Russian society as a result of being given positions of power by the Tsar, and are the bulk of those who are still recognized as having noble roots.

The UAN was established at the end of the Communist regime when important steps were made to revive the traditions of the Armenian nobility. In October 1992 the Union of the Armenian Noblemen (UAN) was created and registered in Armenia. On 27 July 2012, another nobility association - the Meliq Union - was registered by the Ministry of Justice of Armenia. Both associations are registered as public non-governmental organizations.

== Goals ==
Together, these nobility associations have around 450 members representing many aristocratic houses of Armenia. Membership in these unions is open to descendants of old and new Armenian noble families, as well as to the foreign titled nobility that reside in Armenia and abroad, regardless of their political or religious views, age or sex. They conduct their activities in accordance with their Charters, the Constitution and Laws of Armenia, and international law. The main goals of these nobility unions are to:

- Restore the Armenian nobility and its past role as a significant part of society and the state;
- Reinstate the best traditions of the Armenian nobility and reestablish criteria for the noblemen's honor, morals and ethics;
- Restore the heraldry of the noble dynasties and their genealogy;
- Gather, store and do scientific systemization of archival materials, as well as research into the history of the Armenian nobility and specific dynasties;
- Present the history of Armenian nobility, Dynasties, families and their ancestors, to the general public through Mass Media and public lectures.

== See also ==
- Principality of Khachen
- Hasan Jalalyan dynasty
- Bagratid Armenia
- Bagratuni
- Mamikonians
- Bagrevand
- Orbelian dynasty
- Syunik
- Vayots Dzor
- Rubenid dynasty
- Armenian Cilicia
- Heritage Party
- Nakharar
