= Battle of Bagrevand =

Battle in AD 755 between the Abbasid Caliphate and rebelling Armenian forces

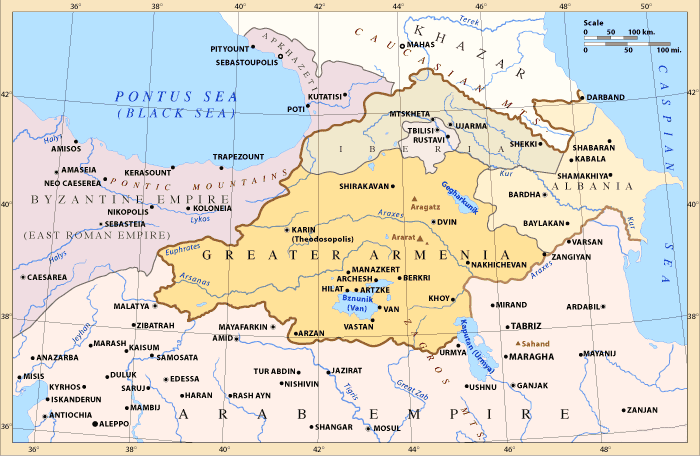
- Bagrevand map
Date	25 April 775
Location	Bagrevand
Result	Abbasid victory

Belligerents
Abbasid Caliphate	Armenian princes

Commanders and leaders
Amir ibn Ismail	Smbat VII Bagratuni †; Mushegh VI Mamikonian †

The Battle of Bagrevand was fought on 25 April 775, in the plains of Bagrevand, between the forces of the Armenian princes who had rebelled against the Abbasid Caliphate and the caliphal army. The battle resulted in a crushing Abbasid victory, with the death of the main Armenian leaders. The Mamikonian family's power in particular was almost extinguished. The battle signalled the beginning of large-scale Armenian migration into the Byzantine Empire.

== Background and the battle ==
Following the establishment of the Abbasid Caliphate, The Abbasids used aggressive policies to weaken the Armenian nayarars. Caliph Abu'l-'Abbas al-Saffah, known for his brutal methods, violently suppressed the Armenian uprising that lasted from 747 to 750. Caliph al-Mansur (r. 754–775) abolished the subsidies paid to the various Armenian princes (nakharar) and in addition imposed heavy tax duties on them. Coupled with instances of religious persecution against the majority Christian Armenian population, these measures prompted the outbreak of a major anti-Abbasid revolt in 774. The revolt was led by Artavazd Mamikonian, but gathered the direct or tacit support of most nakharar families, most notably the hitherto pro-Arab Bagratuni, while the Artsruni and Siwni families remained neutral. The rebellion spread through Armenia, including attacks against Arab tax-collectors, and the local Arab governor, al-Hasan ibn Qahtaba, was unable to contain it. The Caliph sent 30,000 Khurasanis under Amir ibn Isma'il into the province, and at the Battle of Bagrevand on 25 April 775, the nakharar suffered a decisive defeat, losing their leaders, Smbat VII Bagratuni and Mushegh VI Mamikonian. After the battle, the revolt was brutally suppressed by the Abbasids.

== Aftermath ==
As the historian Mark Whittow writes, the battle was a "watershed in Transcaucasian politics". The defeat of the Armenian revolt eliminated the power of several of the nakharar houses, most notably the Mamikonian, Gnuni, Amatuni, Rshtuni, Saharuni, and Kamsarakan families, which survived "either as dependants of other families, or as exiles in Byzantium" (Whittow). On the other hand, the Artsruni, who switched over to the Caliphate in time, profited from the power vacuum to rise to power in Vaspurakan, while the Bagratuni, after retreating for a while to their mountain strongholds, managed to reclaim a dominant position in the country during the 9th century.

The Abbasids followed their re-imposition of control over Armenia by a similar purge of the native Christian nobility in neighbouring Iberia in the 780s, as well as by a new settlement policy which saw increasing numbers of Arab Muslims settled in the Transcaucasus, with the effect that by the turn of the 9th century, the Arab element predominated in the towns and lowlands. In the next century, Caucasian Albania was effectively Islamicized, while Iberia and much of Armenia came under the control of a series of Arab emirates.

== Sources ==
- Adalian, Rouben Paul (2010). Historical Dictionary of Armenia. Scarecrow Press. ISBN 9780810874503.
- Dadoyan, Seta B. (2011). The Armenians in the Medieval Islamic World: The Arab Period in Arminiyah, Seventh to Eleventh Centuries. Transaction Publishers. ISBN 9781412846523.
- Ter-Ghewondyan, Aram (1976) [1965]. The Arab Emirates in Bagratid Armenia. Translated by Garsoïan, Nina. Lisbon: Livraria Bertrand.
- Whittow, Mark (1996). The Making of Byzantium, 600–1025. Berkeley and Los Angeles, California: University of California Press. ISBN 978-0-520-20496-6.
