= Ashot Msaker =

Armenian noble

- Presiding Prince of Armenia
- Reign: 806 – 826
- Predecessor: vacant
- Successor: Bagrat II Bagratuni
- Born: c. 760
- Died: 826
- Issue: Bagrat II Bagratuni; Smbat VIII Bagratuni; Hripsime
- Dynasty: Bagratuni
- Father: Smbat VII Bagratuni
- Religion: Armenian Apostolic

Ashot IV Bagratuni (Armenian: Աշոտ Դ Բագրատունի), better known as Ashot Msaker (Armenian: Աշոտ Մսակեր, "Ashot the Meat Eater / the Carnivorous"), reputedly for his refusal to refrain from eating meat during Lent, was an Armenian prince from the Bagratid family. A fugitive from the failed uprising in 775 against Arab rule in Armenia, where his father was killed, over the next decades he gradually expanded his domains and established a predominant role for himself in the country's affairs, becoming recognized by the Abbasid Caliphate as presiding prince of Armenia from 806 until his death in 826.

== Origin and family ==
Ashot was the son of Smbat VII Bagratuni, presiding prince of Arab-ruled Armenia and sparapet (supreme commander), who had participated in the rebellion against the Abbasid Caliphate and was killed in the disastrous Battle of Bagrevand in 775. The Bagratid family, which traced its origins to the biblical prophet David, gradually displaced the older Armenian nakharar houses (Mamikonians, Artsrunis) in the second half of the 8th century, maintaining its influence in northern and central Armenia.

Ashot's brother was Shapuh Bagratuni, whom Ashot later appointed as sparapet of Armenia. Ashot had two sons and one daughter:

- Bagarat II (prince of Taron, later presiding prince);
- Smbat VIII Ablabas (sparapet of Armenia, father of Ashot I the Great);
- Hripsime, who married Hamazasp II Artsruni, the ruling prince of Vaspurakan.

According to the Georgian historical collection "Kartlis Tskhovreba", Ashot Msaker and Ashot I Kuropalates, the founder of the Georgian Bagrationi dynasty, were first cousins. Smbat VII (Ashot's father) and Vasak Bagratuni (Ashot Kuropalates' grandfather) were brothers. After the defeat of the 774–775 uprising, the son of Vasak — Adarnerse — moved to Kartli (Georgia), and his son Ashot Kuropalates established himself in Klarjeti (Artani) and laid the foundation for the royal branch of the Georgian Bagrationis.

Ashot's first concern was a new and secure residence. The traditional Bagratid residence was Daruynk in the Kogovit canton, at the foot of Mount Masis (modern Bayazet). The security of Daruynk had been threatened since Arab emirate and Utmanik tribes settled in the neighboring cantons of Hark and Apahunik. On one side were these tribes, on the other — Dvin with its permanent Arab garrison — placing Daruynk under threat from both sides. The other ancestral possession, Sper, was distant and unsafe on the Byzantine side.

In 785, Nerseh Kamsarakan died, after which the Kamsarakans are no longer mentioned. Probably the family died out. Ashot Bagratuni took advantage of this circumstance and acquired from the heirs of the Kamsarakans part of Arsharunik, where Bagaran was located, and established himself there.

== The nickname "Msaker" ==
The nickname "Msaker" (Armenian: Մսակեր — literally "meat eater") has several explanations in historiography.

=== Church-religious version (Nikoghayos Adonts) ===
The most widespread version. According to Adonts, Ashot was called "Msaker" for not observing fasting, eating meat on fasting days, and violating strict church canons. This explanation is based on medieval Armenian exegetical tradition, where "msaker" means "one who eats meat," i.e., one who does not observe the fast.

=== Military-metaphorical version ===
The nickname characterizes his intolerant, fierce, and decisive military style in the struggle against enemies (especially Arab rebel emirs and the Jahhafids). According to this version, "msaker" means "devastating/annihilating" the enemy's army, emphasizing his military relentlessness.

=== Physical-everyday version ===
This interpretation associates the nickname with Ashot's physical stature, hunting activities, and consumption of meat.

=== Folk etymology ===
In medieval popular perceptions, the prince was given this nickname as a symbol of military power and inexhaustible energy.

== Life and reign ==
Ashot IV was the son of Smbat VII, presiding prince of Arab-ruled Armenia. Smbat had participated in the rebellion against the Abbasid Caliphate, and had been killed in the disastrous Battle of Bagrevand in 775. Following the battle, Ashot fled from the family's traditional lands in eastern Armenia north to his relatives near the sources of the Araxes river, where he was further from Arab power and closer to the Byzantine Empire. There he also possessed silver mines, which allowed him to buy some of the lands of the Kamsarakan family and establish a new lordship around the fortress of Bagaran, in the province of Ayrarat.

The demise or exile of so many princely families (nakharar) after Bagrevand left a power vacuum in the southern Caucasus: in part this was filled by Arab settlers, who by the early 9th century had established a series of larger or smaller emirates in the region, but among the greatest beneficiaries were the Artsruni, a formerly middle-ranking nakharar family that now came to control most of south-eastern Armenia (Vaspurakan). At the same time, through skilful diplomacy and marriage alliances, Ashot managed to re-establish the Bagratids as the main nakharar family alongside the Artsrunis. As a result, in c. 806, Caliph Harun al-Rashid chose Ashot as the new presiding prince of Armenia, restoring the office that had lapsed with his father's death thirty years previously. The appointment was designed both as a counterweight to the increasingly powerful Artsruni, as well as a focus for Armenian loyalties away from Byzantium, where many families had fled after 775. At about the same time, the Caliph recognized another Bagratid branch, under Ashot I Curopalates, as princes of Caucasian Iberia.

Taking advantage of the turmoil in the Caliphate after the death of Harun al-Rashid in 809 and during the ensuing civil war, Ashot was able to greatly expand his lands and authority. Ashot's rise was challenged by another ambitious family, the Muslim Jahhafids. The family's founder, Jahhaf, was a newcomer in Armenia who had established a considerable power base for himself by claiming Mamikonian lands through his marriage with a daughter of Mushegh VI Mamikonian, one of the Armenian leaders killed at Bagrevand.Ashot twice defeated the Jahhafids in Taron and Arsharunik. In the process he gained not only Taron (which Jahhaf had seized from another Bagratid, Vasak) and Arsharunik with Shirak (which he had earlier bought from the Kamsarakans), but also Ashotz, and eastern Tayk. Frustrated, Jahhaf and his son Abd al-Malik openly rebelled against the Caliphate by seizing the Armenian capital, Dvin, in 813, and unsuccessfully besieging the caliphal governor at Bardaa. Ashot defeated an army of 5,000 sent against him by Abd al-Malik, killing 3,000 of them, while Ashot's brother Shapuh raided the environs of Dvin. As Abd al-Malik prepared to march and confront Shapuh, the local populace rebelled and killed him.

The death of Abd al-Malik "marked the victory of the Bagratids over their most dangerous enemies" (Ter-Ghewondyan), and left Ashot as the greatest landholder among the nakharar. He further secured his position by concluding strategic marriage alliances, giving one of his daughters to the Artsruni prince of Vaspurakan, and another to the emir of Arzen.

By the time of his death in 826, Ashot had effected a remarkable transformation in his fortunes: as Joseph Laurent comments, the "proscribed and dispossessed" fugitive of Bagrevand died as the "most powerful and most popular prince of Armenia". His possessions were divided among his sons. The eldest, Bagrat II Bagratuni, received Taron and Sasun and later the title of ishkhan ishkhanats ("prince of princes"), whereas his brother, Smbat VIII the Confessor, became the sparapet (commander-in-chief) of Armenia and received the lands around Bagaran and the Araxes.

== Religious-dogmatic stance ==
Ashot Msaker paid special attention to preserving Armenian church identity. In the early 9th century, dogmatic struggle intensified in the Christian world between Chalcedonianism (dyophysitism) and anti-Chalcedonianism (miaphysitism), which was especially relevant in the relations between Byzantium and the Eastern churches. In Armenia, this conflict had not only religious but also deep political implications, since accepting Chalcedonianism actually meant coming under Byzantine political influence.

In this context, Ashot Msaker rejected the official proposal of the bishop of the city of Harran in Mesopotamia to accept Chalcedonianism. The bishop of Harran, who acted as an agent of Byzantine influence, tried to convince the Armenian prince of the necessity of church unity, thereby strengthening Byzantium's position in the Transcaucasus. However, Ashot not only rejected this proposal but also firmly defended the dogmatic identity of the Armenian Apostolic Church, rejecting the pro-Byzantine direction.

This decision was an extremely important political step, since the Armenian prince showed that Armenia under his rule did not submit to Byzantine religious-dogmatic pressure and maintained its church independence. Ashot understood that religious identity was one of the most important factors for consolidating the people and preserving statehood, so this step became one of the key components of his policy.

The historian Hovhannes Draskhanakerttsi specifically emphasizes Ashot's dogmatic stance, presenting him as a defender of Armenian national-religious identity. According to the historian, Ashot "remained faithful to Orthodoxy" and "did not agree with foreigners," which testifies to his religious uncompromisingness.Draskhanakerttsi particularly emphasizes that Ashot's position stemmed not from personal but from state interests — the need to preserve the unity of the people.

This position significantly strengthened Ashot's authority among the Armenian clergy and people. Armenian churchmen saw in Ashot their protector, which contributed to the formation of a strong alliance between the prince and the church. This alliance later played an important role in strengthening Bagratid power and restoring the Armenian Kingdom in 885, since the church became the ideological support of the Bagratids.

Remarkably, this dogmatic choice of Ashot Msaker was also reflected in Arabic sources, which note that the Armenian prince "remained faithful to his church" and "did not follow the religion of the Greeks." This fact testifies that Ashot's religious position received recognition even in the Muslim environment as an expression of Armenia's independence.

== Death and legacy ==
Ashot Msaker died in 826. After his death, power was divided among his sons. Bagarat II received Taron (later presiding prince), and Smbat VIII Ablabas received the Ayrarat possessions. Ashot's elder son — Bagarat II — and his grandson — Ashot I the Great (son of Smbat) — continued his work. In 885, Ashot I the Great was officially recognized as king of Armenia and founded the Bagratid Kingdom.

By the time of his death in 826, Ashot had effected a remarkable transformation in his fortunes: as Joseph Laurent comments, the "proscribed and dispossessed" fugitive of Bagrevand died as the "most powerful and most popular prince of Armenia." His possessions were divided among his sons. The eldest, Bagrat II Bagratuni, received Taron and Sasun and later the title of ishkhan ishkhanats ("prince of princes"), whereas his brother, Smbat VIII the Confessor, became the sparapet (commander-in-chief) of Armenia and received the lands around Bagaran and the Araxes.

The historical legacy of Ashot Msaker includes:

- The unification of Armenian lands through a combination of arms, money (land purchases), and flexible diplomacy;
- The creation of a centralized Bagratid principality;
- The official restoration of the institution of "prince of Armenia";
- The defense of the identity of the Armenian Apostolic Church;
- The creation of the territorial-economic foundation on which his grandson — Ashot I the Great — in 885 restored the independence of the Armenian Kingdom.

== Sources ==
- Dadoyan, Seta B. (2011). The Armenians in the Medieval Islamic World: The Arab Period in Arminiyah, Seventh to Eleventh Centuries. Transaction Publishers. ISBN 9781412846523.
- Laurent, Joseph L. (1919). L'Arménie entre Byzance et l'Islam: depuis la conquête arabe jusqu'en 886 (in French). Paris: De Boccard.
- Ter-Ghewondyan, Aram (1976). The Arab Emirates in Bagratid Armenia. Translated by Nina G. Garsoïan. Lisbon: Livraria Bertrand. OCLC 490638192.
- Whittow, Mark (1996). The Making of Byzantium, 600–1025. Berkeley and Los Angeles, California: University of California Press. ISBN 978-0-520-20496-6.

| Vacant Battle of Bagrevand Title last held by Smbat VII Bagratuni | Presiding prince of Armenia under Abbasid suzerainty 806–826 | Vacant Title next held by Bagrat II Bagratuni |
