= Tumanishvili =

Coat of arms of Princes Tumanishvili

The House of Tumanishvili (Georgian: თუმანიშვილი) or House of Tumanian (Armenian: Թումանյաններ), later Russianized as Toumanov or Toumanoff (Russian: Тума́нов) is an Armeno-Georgian Princes Batounishvili family.

== History ==
The family claimed roots in the ancient Armenian noble dynasty of the Mamikonians (Mamikonids), One branch of the family, the Toumaniani, belonged to the Armenian Church; the other branch, the Toumanishvili, was Greek Orthodox.

The house of T’umanids, moved to Georgia from Armenia Maritima (Cilicia) after the twelfth century and adopted the last name Toumanishvili. They were acknowledged by the Kings of Georgia as tavadi (princes), and received hereditary rank as the King's "mdivanbeg" (counselor or vizier).

The Tumanishvili family was on the list of Georgian high nobility that was attached to the Treaty of Georgievsk concluded with the Georgian King Erekle II on July 24, 1783, and was recognized on the Russian Empire's list of princely families in December 1850.

The Prince Mikhail Tumanov was the Ambassador (Minister plenipotentiary) of Armenia to Georgia during the first republic of Armenia.

== People with these names ==
- Cyril Toumanoff, Russian-born Georgian historian
- Tamara Toumanova, Georgian-American ballerina
- Joseph Tumanishvili, stage director of the Stanislavski and Nemirovich-Danchenko Theatre in Moscow after 1943
- Mikheil Tumanishvili (1921–1996), Georgian theatre director
- Hovhannes Tumanyan, Armenian poet
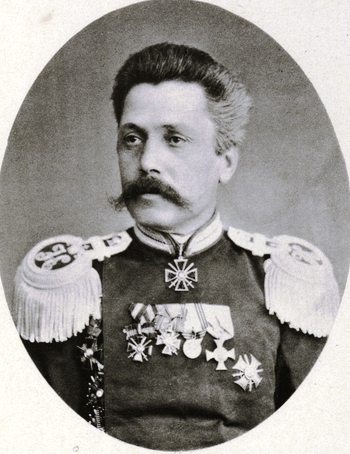
Colonel Prince Tumanov, 1857

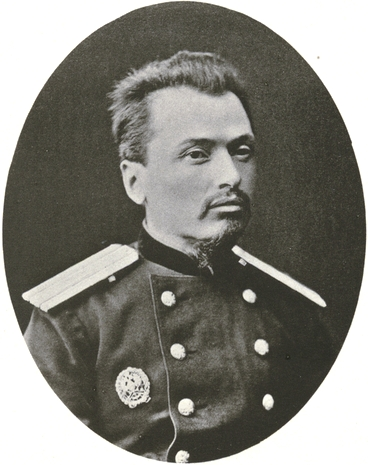
Military engineer-colonel Prince Tumanov, 1863
