= Artavasdes I Mamikonian =

Artavasdes I Mamikonian (Armenian: Արտավազդ Ա Մամիկոնյան) was an Armenian sparapet of the Kingdom of Armenia, and the oldest ancestor of the Mamikonian family. He lived at the end of the 3rd and early 4th centuries. According to Christian Settipani, he married a daughter of the Iberian ruler Amazasp III, and had two sons, Vache Mamikonian and Hamazasp, whose offspring would play an important role in the politics of Armenia.

== Sources ==
- Settipani, Christian (2006). Continuité des élites à Byzance durant les siècles obscurs. Les princes caucasiens et l'Empire du vie au ixe siècle (in French). Paris: de Boccard. ISBN 978-2-7018-0226-8.
- Les dynasties de la Caucasie chrétienne de l'Antiquité jusqu'au XIXe siècle; Tables généalogiques et chronologiques, Rome, 1990.
