= Khosrov III the Small =

4th-century King of Armenia

King of Armenia
- Reign: 330–338/339
- Predecessor: Tiridates III
- Successor: Tiran
- Died: 338/339
- Issue: Tiran; Varazdukht; Bambishn
- House: Arsacid
- Father: Tiridates III
- Mother: Ashkhen
- Religion: Christianity

Khosrov III Kotak (Note: Called "Khosrov II" in Armenian sources that conflate Khosrov I and Khosrov II of Armenia.) (Khosrov the Lesser or the Small; Kotak means 'small/young' or 'short') was the king of Arsacid Armenia c. 330–338/339.

During his early reign, Armenia enjoyed a period of peace and prosperity because of the lack of warfare between the Roman Empire and Sasanian Iran. He founded the new capital city of Dvin and oversaw the creation of large hunting grounds. Peace was interrupted by an invasion of the Maskut tribal group, who occupied the country for a year before being defeated.

According to a modern historian, Khosrov was "completely under the influence of the clergy and Rome's sympathizers [in Armenia]", who pushed him to oppose the encroachments of the Sasanians and their supporters. The resumption of warfare between Rome and the Sasanians in 335 provoked internal rebellions, and the kingdom soon faced Sasanian incursions. Faced with the centrifugal tendencies of the nobility, Khosrov ordered the extermination of several noble houses and tried to keep the more powerful nobles at court where he could supervise them. Khosrov died in 338 after a final Sasanian invasion, which may have ended in a severe defeat for the Armenians and the takeover of the pro-Sasanian party of the Armenian nobility. However, his son Tiran was soon restored to the throne through the intervention of the Roman emperor Constantius II.

== Early reign ==
Khosrov was the son and successor of King Tiridates III. The epithet kotak (from Middle Persian kōdak 'young/small baby') means 'small/young' or 'short'. Khosrov's reign coincided with the leadership of Vrtanes, son of Gregory the Illuminator, over the Armenian Church, which played an important political role at this time. According to Suren Yeremian, Khosrov III was "completely under the influence of the clergy and Rome's sympathizers [in Armenia]", who pushed him to oppose the encroachments of the Sasanians and their supporters. Consequently, the pro-Sasanian nobility (with the help of Khosrov's queen and the still-pagan mountaineers of Sasun) unsuccessfully conspired to assassinate Vrtanes.

According to the fifth-century Armenian history Buzandaran Patmutʻiwnkʻ (The Epic Histories), formerly attributed to a Faustus of Byzantium, Khosrov exterminated two feuding princely houses in Armenia, the Ordunis and the Manavazians, and seized their lands. Per Yeremian's interpretation, the pro-Roman party in Armenia, led by Vrtanes and the Mamikonian family (who hereditarily held the office of sparapet—commander-in-chief of the kingdom's armies), used the king to eliminate the noble houses opposed to them. The lands of these eradicated noble families were permanently given to the church.

The early years of Khosrov's reign were a period of peace and prosperity, as Armenia enjoyed the benefits of the peace established between Rome and Sasanian Iran by the treaty of 298. Khosrov moved his court from Artaxata to a hill to the north called Dvin, where a new city of the same name emerged. (Note: The move was motivated by changes in the microclimate of Artaxata caused by the change in the course of the Metsamor River and the consequent creation of new marshlands, making the climate of Artaxata unhealthy.) He also founded two large hunting grounds in Ayrarat called Khosrovakert and Tachar Mayri. Trees were planted using corvée labor, and the man-made forests were filled with animals. Khosrovakert remains today as the Khosrov Forest State Reserve in modern-day Armenia.

== Maskut invasion ==
This peaceful period was interrupted (Note: In his article on Khosrov III in the Armenian Soviet Encyclopedia, M. Katvalyan instead places the invasion of the Maskut and the revolt of Bakur before the peaceful period in Khosrov's reign.) in 335 when Sanesan (also called Sanatruk), the king of the Maskut, (Note: The Maskut were a group of tribes living along the western coast of the Caspian Sea.) invaded Armenia. (Note: According to Katvalyan, Sanesan invaded at the instigation of the Sasanian king Shapur II.) The Epic Histories calls Sanesan an Arsacid kinsman of Khosrov. The Maskut captured Armenia's second capital of Vagharshapat. Khosrov and Vrtanes took refuge in the fortress of Daroynk in Kogovit, while the sparapet Vache Mamikonian went to Roman territories. The Maskut had free rein over the country for a whole year until Vache returned and defeated them in battle on a hill near Oshakan, in which Sanesan was killed. (Note: Josef Markwart connects the Maskut invasion with the sending of Emperor Constantine the Great's nephew Hannibalianus to Caesarea as governor of the peoples of the Pontic region and suggests that Roman forces aided in the defeat of the Maskut.) Khosrov rewarded his top generals Vache Mamikonian and Vahan Amatuni and the other magnates (nakharar) that had remained loyal to him with land and other lavish gifts.

== Rebellions and conflict with Sasanians ==
In 335, the Sasanian ruler Shapur II attacked Amid; although the attack was unsuccessful, according to Yeremian it encouraged the pro-Persian lords in the border regions of Armenia to secede. In 336/7, Bakur, bdeashkh of Arzanene in southwestern Armenia, revolted against the Arsacid monarchy. (Note: Nicholas Adontz suggests that Bakur was incited by the Sasanians to remedy their losses in the Peace of Nisibis.) Arzanene was one of the great southern Armenian principalities placed under Roman suzerainty by the 298 treaty of Nisibis and thus "may in fact have been semi-independent vis-à-vis the Armenian crown". However, in The Epic Histories Bakur is treated as a rebel against his lord Khosrov III. An Armenian army led by Valinak Siuni defeated Bakur, massacring his entire house. Arzanene was reportedly made a royal holding, with Valinak as its governor. At the same time, the magnate Databen Bznuni allowed a Sasanian army into Armenia. An army was quickly assembled, and Vache Mamikonian and Vahan Amatuni led the Armenian army to victory against the Persian invaders in a battle near the town of Arest near the southeastern coast of Lake Van. Databen was then executed as a traitor; his house was annihilated and their holdings were seized and granted to the bishop Albianos. (Note: An alternative chronology is given by Katvalyan 1976, who connects Databen's rebellion with Shapur's siege of Nisibis.) Khosrov decreed that all magnates with a force larger than 1,000 soldiers were obligated to live at the royal court, where the king could exercise control over them. Historian Hakob Manandyan writes, "this decree by Khosrov III, undoubtedly, is evidence of the weakness of his rule and of the centrifugal and seditious dispositions of the great noble houses."

In 338, Shapur II's army laid siege to Nisibis. According to Manandyan (followed by Yeremian), it was likely at this time that another Persian army attacked Armenia. According to The Epic Histories, in the ensuing battle there were huge losses on both sides, and Sparapet Vache Mamikonian and many other great lords were killed in battle. Most likely, Khosrov died after this battle, also in 338. His remains were interred in the Arsacid royal mausoleum in Ani. He was succeeded by his son, Tiran. According to Manandyan, the battle must have been severe defeat for the Armenians. This is supported by a speech given by Constantine the Great's nephew Julian (the future emperor), which indicates that the pro-Persian party took power in Armenia in 338, forcing Tiran and sympathizers of Rome to flee the country and take refuge in Roman territory. However, Tiran was soon restored to the throne through the intervention of Emperor Constantius II.

== Family ==
Khosrov had three children: a son, Tiran, who succeeded him as king; a daughter, Varazdukht, who married Pap, the son of Patriarch Husik; and another daughter, Bambishn, who married the second son of Husik, Atanagenes, with whom she had Nerses, the future Patriarch of Armenia.

== Sources ==
- Gadjiev, Murtazali (2021). "Armenia and the Land of the Mazkut' (3rd–5th Centuries AD): Written Sources and Archaeological Data". Electrum. 28: 207–219. doi:10.4467/20800909EL.21.014.13372.
- Garsoïan, Nina (1997). "The Aršakuni Dynasty". In Hovannisian, Richard G. (ed.). The Armenian People from Ancient to Modern Times. Vol. 1. New York: St. Martin's Press. ISBN 0-312-10169-4.
- Garsoïan, Nina G. (1989). The Epic Histories Attributed to Pʻawstos Buzand (Buzandaran Patmutʻiwnkʻ). Cambridge, Massachusetts: Harvard University Press. ISBN 0-674-25865-7.
- Hakobyan, T. Kh.; Melik-Bakhshyan, St. T.; Barseghyan, H. Kh. (1988). "Khosrovi petakan argelanotsʻ" Խոսրովի պետական արգելանոց. Hayastani ev harakitsʻ shrjanneri teghanunneri baṛaran Հայաստանի և հարակից շրջանների տեղանունների բառարան [Dictionary of Toponymy of Armenia and Adjacent Territories] (in Armenian). Vol. 2. Erevani hamalsarani hratarakchʻutʻyun. p. 785.
- Hewsen, Robert H. (1992). The Geography of Ananias of Širak (Ašxarhac῾oyc῾): The Long and the Short Recensions. Wiesbaden: Dr. Ludwig Reichert Verlag. ISBN 3-88226-485-3.
- Katvalyan, M. (1976). "Khosrov II Kotak". In Hambardzumyan, Viktor (ed.). Soviet Armenian Encyclopedia (in Armenian). Vol. 5. Yerevan. pp. 78–79.
- Manandyan, Hakob (1978). Erker Երկեր [Works]. Vol. 2. Erevan: Haykakan SSH GA hratarakchʻutʻyun.
- Moses Khorenatsʻi (2006) [Orig. published 1978]. History of the Armenians. Translation and commentary by Robert W. Thomson (Revised ed.). Ann Arbor: Caravan Books. ISBN 978-0-88206-111-5.
- Toumanoff, Cyrille (1976). Manuel de généalogie et de chronologie pour le Caucase chrétien (Arménie, Géorgie, Albanie) (in French). Rome: Edizioni Aquila. p. 74.
- Yeremian, Suren (1984). "Paykʻar Mets Haykʻi tʻagavorutʻyan ankakhutʻyan hamar" Պայքար Մեծ Հայքի թագավորության անկախության համար [Struggle for the independence of the Kingdom of Greater Armenia]. In Yeremian, Suren; et al. (eds.). Hay zhoghovrdi patmutʻyun Հայ ժողովրդի պատմություն [History of the Armenian People] (in Armenian). Vol. 2. Erevan: HSSH GA hratarakchʻutʻyun. pp. 81–110.

Khosrov III the Small Arshakuni dynasty Born: - Died: 338
Preceded by Tiridates III 287-330	Khosrov Kotak; 330-338	Succeeded by Tiran II 338-350
