= Smbat VIII Bagratuni =

Smbat the Confessor
- Prince of Princes of Armenia
- Flag of Bagratid Armenia

Prince of Armenia
- Reign: 852-855
- Predecessor: Bagrat II Bagratuni
- Successor: Ashot I

Sparapet of Armenia
- Reign: 826-855
- Predecessor: Ashot Msaker
- Successor: Ashot I
- Died: 859; Samarra, Abbasid Caliphate
- Issue: Ashot I, Smbat, Shapuh, Mushegh, Abas
- Dynasty: Bagratuni dynasty
- Father: Ashot Msaker
- Religion: Armenian Apostolic Church

Smbat VIII Bagratuni (Armenian: Սմբատ Ը Բագրատունի), also known as Smbat the Confessor (Armenian: Սմբատ Խոստովանող) and in Arabic sources as Ablabas (Arabic أبو العباس, meaning "Father of Abbas"; birth date unknown – died 859) was the Prince of Armenia (852–855) and the Sparapet (Supreme Commander) of Armenia (824–855). He was the son of Ashot Msaker (the Carnivore) and a member of the Bagratuni royal dynasty. He was the father of Ashot I (King of Armenia, 885–890), Abas (Sparapet of Armenia, 862–892), Smbat, and Shapuh the Historian. Smbat is particularly famous for his steadfastness during his captivity in Samarra following the events of 850–855, where he refused to renounce his Christian faith and was subsequently executed. Because of his unyielding faith, Armenian historians bestowed upon him the epithet "the Confessor" (Khostovanogh).

== Life ==
Smbat was the younger son of Ashot IV Bagratuni, who by the time of his death in 826 had come to control a large part of Armenia, and was recognized by the Abbasid caliphs as presiding prince (ishkhan) of Armenia. A part of Smbat's life was spent as a hostage at the Abbasid court, which was a common practice by the Caliphate to maintain control over subordinate Christian princes.

Following the death of Ashot Msaker in 826, his domains were divided between his sons. Bagrat took the regions of Taron, Khuyt and Sassoun, i.e. the family's domains on the Upper Euphrates, while Smbat received the ancestral lands around Bagaran and the Araxes river. In a calculated effort to keep the two brothers divided, the Abbasid government divided Ashot's authority and conferred on Smbat the title of commander-in-chief (sparapet) and ruler of Shirak, while Bagrat was named prince of princes (ishkhanats ishkhan) four years after his father's death. The Caliphate, pursuing a "divide and rule" policy, officially recognized this division in order to pit the brothers against each other.

== Political activity ==
Unlike his elder brother Bagarat, who sometimes more actively challenged Arab rule, Smbat was inclined toward a more cautious policy, owing to his experience during the years he spent as a hostage at the Caliphate's court. Nevertheless, he repeatedly led or participated in revolts against the Caliphate's harsh policies.

In the late 820s and early 830s, taking advantage of the Khurramite rebellion of Babak that diverted the Caliphate's attention, Smbat allied with the Arab mutaqallib Sawada al-Jahhafi and Prince Sahak of Syunik against Khalid ibn Yazid al-Shaybani, the governor of Arminiya (829–832, 841). Refusing the conciliatory mediation of Catholicos Davit II, this alliance engaged Khalid's forces in battle near Kavakert on the banks of the Hrazdan River, but suffered a severe defeat; Prince Sahak of Syunik was killed, while Smbat and Sawada fled.

=== Opposition to the Catholicos issue ===
The tension between the brothers became more evident in 833, following the election of Hovhannes IV Ovayetsi as Catholicos. A few years later, Bagarat, accepting the accusations of the Catholicos's opponents, attempted to depose him and exiled him to Ayrivank. However, Smbat, with the support of the northern princes and bishops, convened a council that restored Hovhannes IV to his throne, which he occupied until 855 despite the opposition of Bagarat and his southern supporters. This event deepened the rift in Armenia between the northern factions (led by Smbat, aligned with the princes of Syunik and the Church) and the southern factions (led by Bagarat and the Artsrunis).

The appearance of the Tondrakian movement's first leader in historical sources is attributed to the era of Smbat Bagratuni and Catholicos Hovhannes Ovayetsi . The founder of the Tondrakian movement, Smbat Zarehavantsi, was born in the village of Zarehavan in the Tsaghkotn district. He lived and operated during the first half of the 9th century. The prevailing view in historiography is that Smbat Zarehavantsi emerged on the political and religious scene in the 830s, during the tenure of Catholicos Hovhannes IV Ovayetsi (833–855) and Sparapet (Commander-in-Chief) Smbat Bagratuni (822–855). According to the testimony of Grigor Magistros, "This accursed one appeared in the days of Lord Hovhannes and Smbat Bagratuni".

== Smbat's position on the eve of the Bugha campaign ==
=== Causes and beginning of the uprising of 850-852 ===
In 850, Caliph al-Mutawakkil (847–861), seeking to restore central authority weakened by internal unrest in Samarra and ensure full tax collection, sent a new governor to Armenia, Abu Said Muhammad al-Marwazi . His task was to tour the Armenian provinces in person and collect the maximum amount of taxes, without shying away from even the harshest measures.

Upon learning of this, Bagarat Bagratuni, the "Prince of Princes," sent a delegation of princes bearing valuable gifts to meet him, requesting that he advance no further. Abu Said, assessing the danger, retreated, leaving behind two officials to handle tax collection: Musa ibn Zurara (Bagarat's son-in-law), who was appointed deputy governor and chief tax collector in Diyar Bakr, and Ala ibn Ahmad as-Sawafi (referred to as Tsovatsi in Armenian sources), who was tasked with collecting taxes in Vaspurakan.

Ala began plundering the villages of Vaspurakan, selling their inhabitants into slavery. Ashot Artsruni, the Prince of Vaspurakan, issued a warning to him, but Ala ignored it. Ashot then defeated the Arabs near the village of Archuch, killing Ala's brother. Subsequently, Ashot Artsruni joined forces with Bagarat Bagratuni, and together they achieved a brilliant victory against Musa ibn Zurara in Taron. These Armenian successes sparked panic in the Caliphate's capital, Samarra .

Upon returning to Samarra, Abu Said reported the situation in Armenia to the caliph, emphasizing that Bagarat was demanding the governorship of all Arminiya. The caliph dispatched Abu Said once more with new troops, but he died en route. He was succeeded by his son, Yusuf, who received orders to destroy the princely houses of Southern Armenia—the Bagratunis and the Artsrunis. In 851, Yusuf invaded Armenia from the direction of Atropatene. He summoned Ashot Artsruni under false pretenses; however, Ashot was forewarned and fortified himself in Mardastan. Ashot then appeased Yusuf with valuable gifts, prompting him to retreat. Yusuf subsequently moved westward and invited Bagarat Bagratuni to meet him in Khlat, promising to hand over the governorship of Arminiya to him on the pretext that he was unaccustomed to the northern climate. Bagarat, who had long sought this position, traveled to Khlat without suspicion. Upon arrival, however, he was immediately arrested and sent to Samarra in iron chains.

Bagarat's capture sparked widespread outrage across Armenia, particularly in its southern regions. His sons, Ashot and Davit, escaped and organized resistance after fortifying themselves in the mountainous regions of the Armenian Taurus. They were joined by Hovnan Khutetsi (Yunan ibn Tornik), who raised units from among the warlike highlanders of Sasun and Khut. The rebels descended from the mountains into the Plain of Mush, encircled the city, and routed the Arabs, liberating the Artsruni hostages. Terrified, Yusuf sought refuge in a tall church, but an Armenian soldier pierced and killed him there with a spear. According to the Arab historian al-Tabari, this occurred in February–March 852 (Ramadan, 237 AH). Following Yusuf's assassination, the wave of rebellion swept across numerous regions of Armenia. Reports reached the caliph that Armenia was in full revolt.

=== The beginning of the campaign of Bugha al-Kabir (852) ===
In the spring of 852, Caliph al-Mutawakkil assembled a massive army from across the Caliphate. He promised the generals extensive domains in Armenia once the rebels were crushed, even issuing them sealed documents in advance granting ownership rights to specific villages.

The command of the army was given to the Turkic general Bugha al-Kabir ("the Elder"). At this moment, the division between the factions of Smbat and Bagarat became especially pronounced. Prior to the arrival of the large Arab army, a degree of cooperation existed among the Armenian princes. However, when the Caliph's vast force invaded Armenia, the faction led by Smbat Bagratuni withdrew from the struggle. This circumstance significantly weakened the resistance of the southern princes.

Smbat's cautious policy was also significant. His prior experience as a hostage at the Abbasid court, along with his historical relations with Arab authority, made him a more prudent politician. Consequently, his initial neutrality should not be viewed merely as a desire to oppose the rebellion, but rather as a calculated political attempt to preserve the Bagratuni dynasty and his own princely standing.

Following Bagarat's capture, Smbat was officially recognized as the ruler of Armenia (Sahib al-Armani). Nevertheless, his position remained deeply ambiguous. Officially, he was expected to stand alongside the Arab authorities and even accompany Bugha during his campaigns as the formal leader of Armenia. In practice, he attempted to remain neutral in the fight against the rebels and sought every opportunity to alleviate the condition of Armenian captives. He persuaded Bugha to release a portion of the prisoners and personally escorted them to his own domains under armed guard. This policy, however, did not save him from eventual captivity.

Upon reaching Khlat, a coastal city on Lake Van, Bugha divided his troops in various directions. He sent one portion of his army to lay waste to the southern regions, while he himself, accompanied by Smbat Bagratuni, advanced toward Vaspurakan. In the absence of his brother, Smbat is presented in sources from this period as the official native ruler of Armenia. His accompaniment of Bugha demonstrates that at this stage, Smbat was still trying to preserve his political standing without openly opposing the forces of the Caliphate . In Vaspurakan, Bugha forced Ashot Artsruni to surrender and dispatched him to Samarra, to join Bagarat Bagratuni, who was already held captive there. Bugha then continued his campaign. Certain princes of Vaspurakan attempted to maintain guerrilla warfare, but the Arab forces carried out widespread destruction. Following the conquest of Southern Armenia, Bugha moved to Dvin and turned his campaign against the northern princes.

In 853, Bugha's campaign expanded toward Georgia, Syunik, and Caucasian Albania. His forces inflicted heavy devastation across various regions of Arminiya. Sparapet Smbat Bagratuni, seeking to spare his country from Bugha's destructive actions, presented himself to the Arab general and cooperated with him, thereby earning his trust. However, this cooperation did not save Smbat in the long run. In 855, when Bugha returned to Samarra, Smbat Bagratuni was also taken there in captivity alongside other Armenian princes.

=== Captivity, martyrdom, and the nickname "Confessor" ===
In 855, Bugha arrested Smbat and sent him in chains to the Caliphate's new capital, Samarra (in Iraq). There, by order of Caliph al-Mutawakkil (847–861), the captured Armenian princes were presented with a choice: convert to Islam or face execution. According to Tovma Artsruni, several of the Armenian princes "loved human glory more than divine glory." They consulted among themselves and decided to formally accept the Caliph's demand.

The historian Tovma Artsruni, once again displaying a negative stance toward the Bagratunis, attempts to place the blame on Bagarat Bagratuni, claiming he set a poor example for the others.

In addition to Bagarat, princes of the Artsruni house—Ashot, Vasak, and others—apostatized, as did the Syuni brothers, Vasak and Ashot, among others. The captives also included members of the clergy who refused to adopt the enemy's faith, including Bishop Hovhannes of the Artsrunis and others. A number of princes likewise refused to convert to Islam: Smbat Bagratuni, his sister Hripsime, Hovnan Khutetsi—the leader of the 851 rebellion against the governor Yusuf—Stepanos Kon, and Grigor Artsruni. They were all executed.

Interestingly, Armenian historians interpret Smbat Bagratuni's self-sacrificing act as a desire to atone for his guilt, given his participation in suppressing the rebellion in Armenia. For this reason, he is referred to as "Smbat the Confessor" (Smbat Khostovanogh). He is venerated as a confessor of the faith by the Armenian Church. All of these martyrs were executed during the final years of al-Mutawakkil's reign.

However, beginning in 857, a portion of the Armenian feudal lords gradually returned to their homeland and reclaimed their domains. Bagarat Bagratuni did not return, likely due to ongoing disagreements between him and many of Armenia's feudal lords.

Smbat's son Ashot V Bagratuni succeeded his father as sparapet. In 862 Ashot also became "prince of princes", leading eventually to his establishment of the virtually independent Bagratid Kingdom of Armenia in 884.

== Literature ==
- Ter-Ghewondyan, Aram (1976) [1965]. The Arab Emirates in Bagratid Armenia. Translated by Garsoïan, Nina. Lisbon: Livraria Bertrand.
- Nina G. Garsoian,The Arab Invasions and the Rise of the Bagratuni (640-884),New York, 1997
- ARMENIAN ELECTRONIC ENCYCLOPEDIA, Smbat VIII Bagratuni or Smbat the Confessor
- Armenia under the Rule of the Arab Caliphate, THE STRUGGLE FOR THE RESTORATION OF INTERNAL AUTONOMY IN THE FIRST HALF OF THE 9TH CENTUR
- Nuneh Sarumyan, The Tondrakyan Movement and Smbat Zarehavantsi in Armenian Historiography
