= Vache I Mamikonian =

Sparapet of Great Armenia (310–338)

- Born: 3th century
- Died: 335 or 338
- Allegiance: Kingdom of Armenia
- Rank: Sparapet (generalissimo)
- Conflicts: Sanesan invasion of Armenia; Battle of Oshakan; Shapur invasion of Armenia (337-338) †; Battle of Arest
- Children: Artavasdes II Mamikonian; Artashen Mamikoian

Vache I Mamikonian (3rd century - 335 or 338) was an Armenian military officer from the Mamikonian family, nakharar, sparapet (generalissimo) of Kingdom of Armenia (310–338), prince of Taron canton of Turuberan region, son of sparapet Artavasdes I Mamikonian, father of sparapet Artavasdes II Mamikonian and Artashen Mamikoyan.

== Name ==
The name Vache (Vačʻē) is of Iranian origin and is an abbreviation of the related names Vachaque (Վաչակ, Vachak) and Vachagã (Վաչագան, Vačʻagan).

== Biography ==
By the order of the Armenian king Khosrov III Kotak, he exterminated the nakharar clans, the Manavazians and the Ordunis, who were fighting against each other and weakening the country's forces.According to the Faustus of Byzantium, the nahapet of the Orduni clan encroached on the power of King Khosrov III, seizing and destroying the royal house, as a result of which the princes of the Orduni clan were killed by order of Khosrov, and their ancestral lands, located in the region of Basen, with all their borders, were given to the Basen bishop, originally from Orduni. In 335 Sanesan invaded Armenia and sacked the whole of Armenia from Satagh to Ganjak for almost a year. Having united the armies of the king and the nakharar, Vache Mamikonian first defeated the pretender to the Armenian throne Sanesan (or Sanatruk), who was killed during his invasion of Armenia, the head of the king Sanesan was brought and presented to the king of Armenia.

Sasanian king Shapur II invaded Armenia in 337, the Bznuni, another noble family, betrayed Armenia to Persia, which launched an invasion as far as Lake Van. Later in 337, a Persian army entered the Her and Zarevand cantons and destroyed the country. Databen Bznuni, the commander of the Armenian troops was sent against that army, Databen betrayed Armenians and fled to enemis side. Khosrov III then ordered his two generals, Vache Mamikonian and Vahan Amatuni, to repel the Persians and punish the felonious family, which was also exterminated.

Vache succeeded against enemy armies numbering 30,000 in the Battle of Arest on the shore of Lake Van. Databen Bznuni was among the large number of prisoners, who was stoned to death as a traitor. Bidaxsh Bakur, a rebel from Aghdznya, who started a fight against the central government with the help of the Persian army, also received the same fate. Shortly afterwards, the Armenian army suffered a serious defeat during which Vache and was killed.

== Family ==
The name of Vache Mamikonyan's wife is unknown. Vache had 4 children.

- Artavazd Mamikonyan, Armenian general (338–350).
- Artashen Mamikonyan, Armenian nakharar, father of Manuel Mamikonian.
- A girl with an unknown name, Andovk Siunni's wife.
- A girl with an unknown name, the wife of Arshavir Kamsarakan.
