= Rshtuni =

Rshtuni (Armenian: Ռշտունի, also spelled Rashduni, Rshdouni, Reshdouni, Rashdouni, Rachdouni, Rachdoni, Rshduni, and Rushdoony) was an old Armenian noble house which ruled the region of Rshtuniq who were purportedly descendants of Rusas I of Urartu.

The first attested member of the house is Manadjihr Rshtuni from about 330, brother of Zora, attested in 335 and 350 both of whom revolted against the King of Armenia Tiran, along with the prince Vatche Artsruni. The king ordered the extermination of the two families, but Savasp Artsruni and Tadjat Rshtuni survived. The latter is the father of Garegin Rshtuni, attested between 370–80.

Artak Rshtuni is attested in 445. The family rules from their region of Rshtuniq, as well as Bznuniq obtained from Arshakunis after the extermination of the family Bznuni. Rshtunis support the Sassanid Persians for the most part against the Byzantines.

The best-known member and the leading figure of the family in the early 7th century is Theodoros Rshtuni, marzban then prince of Armenia from 638 to 655, who had the difficult task of ensuring Armenia's survival between Byzantine and Arab ambitions. Following the destruction of the Sassanid empire, the Muslim incursions into Armenia in 642 began. He is eventually exiled by the Caliph to Damascus.

The family becomes increasingly irrelevant following Theodoros' exile, becoming vassals of the Artsrunis and losing their hereditary land of Bznunik to the Mamikonians in 656. Vart Rshtuni is the last attested member of the family in 705.
