= Rshtunik =

Rshtunik (Armenian: Ռշտունիք) was a canton (gavar) of the province of Vaspurakan of historical Armenia, encompassing the area on the southern coast of Lake Van, which was also referred to as Rshtuneats Tsov ("Sea of Rshtunik"), as well as Aghtamar Island. It was located to the east of the canton of Andzevatsik, to the north of Moxoene, to the west of Hayots Dzor, and to the east of Yerevark of Turuberan province. It was ruled by the Rshtuni (also referred to as Rashduni) noble house until the ninth century.

The name of the region is likely connected with the name of Urartu/Urashtu, the Iron Age kingdom that was centered on the coastal regions around Lake Van.

Rshtunik covered a mountainous region filled with river rapids, fertile lands, and rich mines. It was also home to a royal residence of the king of Armenia called Ostan Rshtuneats, located directly across from Aghtamar Island. In medieval times, Rshtunik contained numerous churches and monasteries, which functioned as centers of learning and art. One of the most famous of these was Narekavank (since demolished), where St. Gregory of Narek lived and studied.

The region corresponded approximately to the latter-day district of Gevaş in the Van Vilayet of the Ottoman Empire. Before the Armenian genocide, this district contained more than twenty Armenian-populated villages with a total population of about ten thousand.

== See also ==
- List of regions of ancient Armenia
