= Manavazian =

The Manavazians (Old Armenian: Մանաւազեան, romanized: Manawazean) were a noble family (nakharars) in ancient Armenia. They ruled the area around the fortress-city of Manazkert. They disappeared in the mid-fourth century as a result of feuding with other noble families. According to the Armenian history of Movses Khorenatsi, the related houses of Manavazian, Orduni, and Bznuni destroyed each other in conflict. The fifth-century Armenian history Buzandaran Patmutʻiwnkʻ reports that the Armenian king Khosrov III (r. c. 330 – 338) unsuccessfully attempted to reconcile the Manavazians and the Ordunis, after which he ordered their annihilation.

== History ==
The Manavazians ruled the area around the fortress-city of Manazkert (also Manavazkert, modern-day Malazgirt, Turkey), in the upper valley of the Arsanias River, north of the territories of the House of Bznuni and west of those of the House of Apahuni. Together with the Bznunis and Apahunis, the Manavazians derived from one line of the House of Hayk, the legendary progenitor of the Armenian nation. The Armenian history of Movses Khorenatsi writes that they were descendants of Manavaz, a son of Hayk. In Cyril Toumanoff's view, this attribution "they were, accordingly, of Urartian, probably royal, origin." The name of their main fortress, Manazkert, is thought to derive from the name of Menua, a king of Urartu. Movses Khorenatsi reports that the Manavazians, the Bznunis, another related house, the Ordunis, feuded with each other in the mid-third century, leading to their mutual destruction. According to the fifth-century Armenian history Buzandaran Patmutʻiwnkʻ, King Khosrov III of Armenia (r. c. 330 – 338) unsuccessfully attempted to reconcile the Manavazians and the Ordunis, after which he sent his chief general Vache Mamikonian to eradicate the two clans. Afterwards, the Manavazian lands were given to the house of the bishop Albianos. The Manavazians are not included in the Gahnamak ("Rank List" of the Armenian nobility), since it had been destroyed before this list was made, but it anachronistically appears in the Zornamak ("Military List") with 1,000 retainers.

== See also ==
- List of regions of old Armenia
