= Sanesan =

- King of Maskut; King of Paytakaran
- Died: 336; Oshakan, Arsacid Armenia
- House: Arsacid dynasty

Sanesan (Armenian: Սանեսան) or Sanatruk (Armenian: Սանատրուկ) was the king of Maskut in the early 4th century. Sanesan's people, the Mazk'kut'k, have variously been identified as the Massagetae or as the Meskheti.

== Life ==
According to both Faustus Byuzand and Moses of Chorene, when St.Grigoris arrived in the principality of Maskut (located along the northeastern Azerbaijani and south Dagestani shore of the Caspian Sea) to preach Christianity, its ruler of the local branch of Arsacids ordered him killed. Grigoris was trampled to death by mounted Maskut soldiers in the Vatnean Valley, near the present-day village of Nughdi 37 south of Derbent in c. 334. However, according to Faustus it was Sanesan, while Moses describes him as Sanatruk. Accorting do Murtazali Gadjiev, both Sanesan and Sanatruk are different figures, latter being a noble, former a king.

=== Invasion of Armenia ===
According to the history of Faustus Byuzand, after death of Tiridates III and accession of Khosrov III the Small to the throne, he invaded Armenia with an army of various peoples including Huns and Alans in 335, trying to usurp the throne. After occupying Armenia for most of a year, he was defeated and killed by the Armenian general Vatche Mamikonian. Slightly differing from Faustus and Moses, Movses Kaghankatvatsi names the king as Sanatruk and mentions him as king of "Albanians of Paytakaran" as opposed to Urnayr, who was king of Albania which was located more to the north-west of Paytakaran. According to his history, the king allied with Shapur II and invaded then Roman client Khosrov, taking about 30,000 soldiers with him. Kaghankatvatsi links Sanesan's killing to Vahan Amatuni, another general of Khosrov. Georgian author Zaza Aleksidze tried to reconcile three versions, saying that Grigoris arrived at Sanesan's camp when he was preparing for his invasion of Armenia. He captured Paytakaran in 334 and started to gather troops for invasion of Armenia later.

According to Moses of Chorene, Sanesan died near Oshakan fortress in 336.

== Sources ==
- Faustus of Byzantium, History of the Armenians, Third Book, Chs 6–7.
