= Mandakuni =

Mandakuni (Armenian: Մանդակունի) was a region and a family of the old Armenia in southeastern Anatolia c. 300–800, of Caspio-Median or Matianian-Mannaean origin.

About 451 were rulers Pharsman Mandakuni and Sahak Mandakuni.

== See also ==
- List of regions of old Armenia
