= Saharuni =

Saharuni (Armenian: Սահառունիներ) was a region and family of Armenia c. 400–800.

The first known ruler is Bat Saharuni (see Mamikonian) c. 380.

The ruler about 451 was Karen Saharuni; in 482 was Qadchadch Saharuni; c. 630 the ruler was David Saharuni.

Vasak of Kardjet ruled the region since 772. Then his son Adarnase. Ashot, son of Adarnase, was ruler in the 9th century.

== See also ==
- List of regions of old Armenia
