= Bagrevand =

Historical region of Armenia

Coordinates: 39.7981°N 42.6744°E

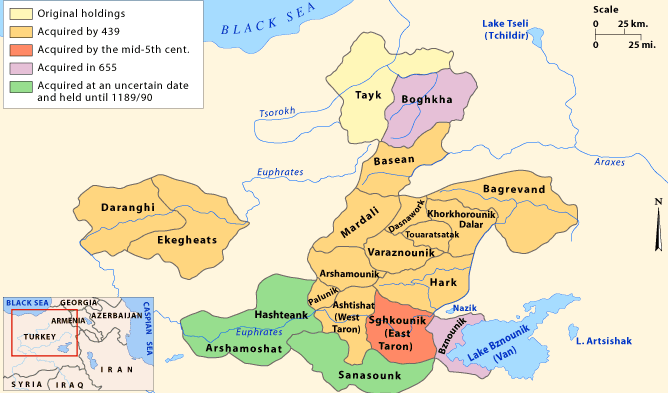
Map showing Bagrevand under the rule of the Mamikonian

Bagrevand (also spelled Bagrewand) was a region of Armenia.

The Old Iranian etymology of the name is disputed. It is either derived from *bāγa.raivanta ("rhubarb garden") or baga-raēvanta-, which either means "the rich giver" (Mithra) or "the bounteous God" (Ahura Mazda).

== History ==
It was ruled first by Mamikonians and then, in IX-XI centuries, by the Bagratuni family,.

It also had its own diocese, whose bishops probably included the theologian Yeznik of Kolb.

== See also ==
- List of regions of ancient Armenia
- Battle of Bagrevand
- Bagdasarian

== Sources ==
- Marciak, Michał (2017). Sophene, Gordyene, and Adiabene: Three Regna Minora of Northern Mesopotamia Between East and West. BRILL. ISBN 978-9004350700.
