= Mamikonian =

Armenian dynasty, 4th to 8th centuries

- Country: Armenia; Persia
- Founded: 314
- Founder: Artavasdes I
- Current head: Extinct
- Final ruler: Musel VI
- Titles: Prince of Tayk; Prince of Taron; Regent of Armenia; Marzban of Persarmenia
- Dissolution: 1189
- Cadet branches: Liparitids; Tumanishvili

Mamikonian (Note: Also Mamikonean, Mamigonian, or Mamikonyan) Old Armenian: Մամիկոնեան) (Note: reformed orthography: Մամիկոնյան, Western Armenian pronunciation: Mamigonian) was an Armenian aristocratic dynasty which dominated Armenia between the 4th and 8th centuries—through the late antique kingdom, Sasanian, Byzantine, and Arab dominations. They were the most notable noble house in early Christian Armenia after the ruling Arsacids and held the hereditary positions of sparapet (supreme commander of the army) and dayeak (royal tutor), allowing them to play the role of kingmaker for the later Armenian kings. They ruled over extensive territories, including the Armenian regions of Tayk, Taron, Sasun, and Bagrevand, among others. The Mamikonians had a reputation as supporters of the Roman (and later Byzantine) empire in Armenia against Sasanian Iran, although they also served as viceroys under Persian rule. Their influence over Armenian affairs began to decline at the end of the 6th century and suffered a final, decisive blow after a failed rebellion against Arab rule over Armenia in 774/75.

== Origin ==
The origin of the Mamikonians is unknown. Movses Khorenatsi in his History of Armenia (traditionally dated to the 5th century) claims that in the year of the death of Ardashir I (i.e., 242) a nobleman of Chen (Old Armenian: Ճեն, plural Ճենք, Chenk’, thought to refer to China) origin named Mamgon fled to the Persian court after being sentenced to death by Arbok Chen-bakur, his foster brother (or half-brother) and the king of Chenk’, due to the scheming of a third brother and prince, Bghdokh. Chen-bakur demanded Mamgon's extradition from Ardashir's successor, Shapur I, who instead exiled the prince to Armenia, where he entered the service of the Armenian king Trdat and received land for him and his entourage to settle, founding the Mamikonian dynasty. A slightly different story is recorded in the Primary History traditionally attributed to Sebeos, according to which two noble brothers from Chenastan named Mamik and Konak, sons of Karnam, fled to Parthia after a failed uprising against their brother, King Chenbakur. The Parthian king settled the two brothers and their household in Armenia, where they founded the Mamikonian clan. Another 5th-century Armenian historian, Pavstos Buzand, also mentions the reputed Chinese/Chen origin of the Mamikonians. In his History of Armenia, he twice mentions that the Mamikonians descended from the royal house of Chenk’/China and as such were not inferior to the Arsacid rulers of Armenia.

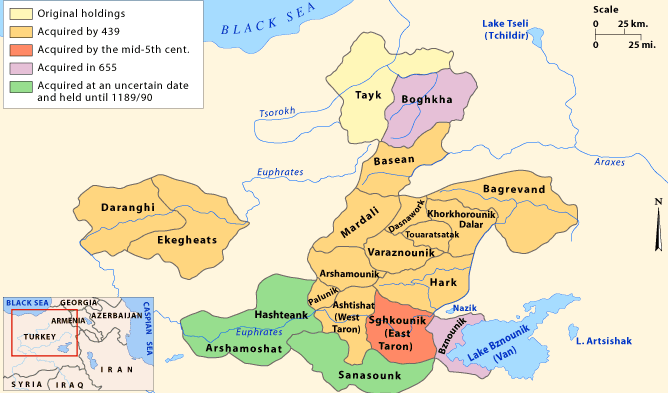
Expansion of the territories of the House of Mamikonian.

Although it seems that the legend of Mamikonian origins, even if untrue, does indeed concern China, more recent scholarship suggests that Chenk’ is to be identified either with the Tzans, a Kartvelian tribe in the southern Caucasus, or with a Central Asian group living near the Syr Darya river. Nicholas Adontz believed the legend to be "a confusion, prompted by the love of exotic origins, between the ethnicon čen and that of the Georgian Čan-ians (Tzanni) or Lazi[...] who were settled in the neighbourhood of Tayk῾." He derives the dynasty's name from Georgian mama, meaning father, combined with the Armenian diminutive suffix -ik. This view is shared by Cyril Toumanoff, who describes the Mamikonians as the "immemorial dynasts of Tayk῾," and Robert Hewsen. Other Armenian dynasties also claimed foreign royal ancestry: the Bagratunis claimed Davidic descent and the Artsrunis claimed royal Assyrian ancestry. The later medieval Armenian author Vardan Areveltsi mentions that the Chenk’ live in the Caucasus near Derbend. One scholar argued in the 1920s that the Chenk’ were a Turkic group that lived by the Syr Darya.

Armen Keshishyan insists on a local origin, possibly from the times of the Hittites and Hurrians.

== Rise ==
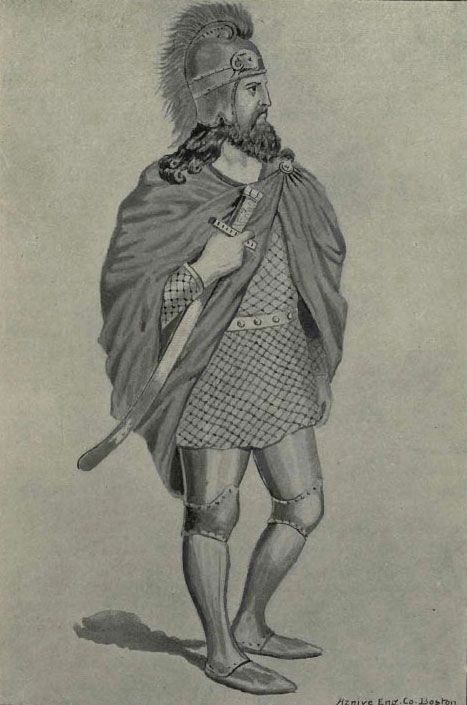
Illustration of Vardan Mamikonian in the 1898 book Illustrated Armenia and Armenians

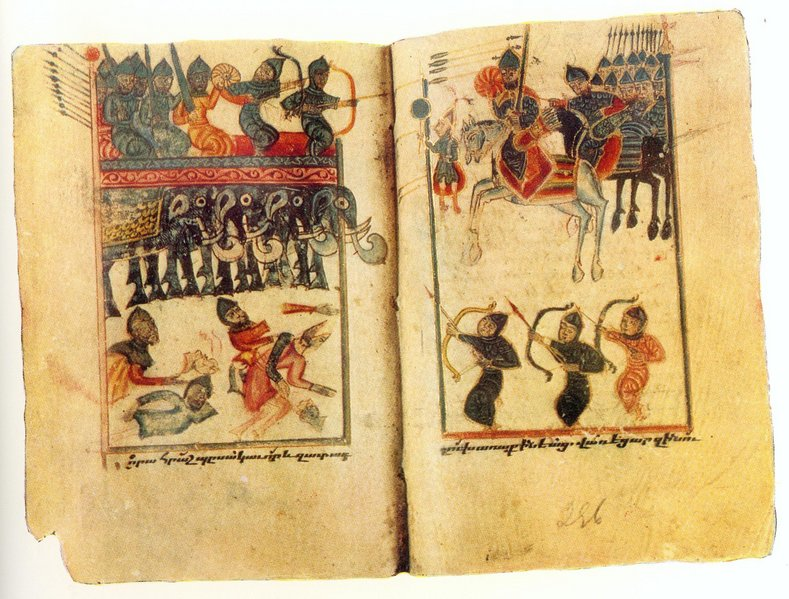
15th-century miniature depicting the Battle of Avarayr (451)

The Mamikonians feature prominently in the works of most of the classical Armenian historians. Pavstos Buzand speaks highly favorably of the dynasty, while Movses Khorenatsi is noticeably hostile to them and minimizes their role. Under the late Arsacid Kingdom of Armenia, the family occupied a preeminent position among the Armenian noble houses: they were hereditary commanders-in-chief of the army (sparapet) and royal tutors (dayeak) and controlled large domains, including most of Taron and Tayk. The Mamikonians later increased their property further with the death of the last hereditary Patriarch of Armenia, Isaac in ca. 428, when they inherited many Church lands through the marriage of his only daughter to Hamazasp Mamikonian.

The family first appears in the early 4th century, although Toumanoff asserts that Mancaeus, who defended Tigranocerta against the Romans in 69 BC, was a member of the dynasty. The first Mamikonian lord, or nakharar, about whom anything certain is known was a certain Vache Mamikonian (fl. 330–339). According to Pavstos Buzand, Vache Mamikonian, son of Artavazd and sparapet of Armenia, was ordered by King Khosrov III to exterminate two feuding noble families, the Manavazians and the Ordunis. Vache also successfully defended Armenia against Sanesan, the invading king of the Maskuts, slaying the latter in a battle near Oshakan Fortress and receiving new holdings as reward. He later fell in battle against the Persians and was succeeded as sparapet by his son Artavazd, who was a child at the time, since "no other adult could be found in that clan." This episode and others in Pavstos' History illustrate the nature of the office of sparapet as the exclusive and hereditary possession of the Mamikonian clan.

The family reappears in chronicles in 355, during the reign of Arshak (Arsaces) II. At that point the family chief was sparapet Vasak Mamikonian. When Arshak II sided with the Sasanian Empire against the Eastern Roman Empire, Vasak raided Roman lands for six years. After Arshak switched to the Roman side against Persia, Vasak Mamikonian commanded the Armenian defense, winning a series of victories against Shapur II's forces, although he was unable to capture the rebellious Armenian nobleman Meruzhan Artsruni. After years of warfare, multiple other Armenian lords defected to the Persian side, including Vasak's renegade brother Vahan Mamikonian. Vasak was later flayed alive after being lured to Persia for peace negotiations together with Arshak II. Shapur laid waste to Armenia and installed Meruzhan Artsruni and Vahan Mamikonian as governors (according to Pavstos, Vahan was later killed by his own son, Samuel).

Vasak was succeeded as sparapet by his son Mushegh I Mamikonian, who restored Arshak's heir, Pap, to the throne c. 367/370 with the support of an imperial army sent by the emperor Valens. Mushegh drove the Persians out of Armenia and brutally punished the provinces that had revolted against the Arsacid monarchy, restoring the kingdom's former borders. Following Pap's murder in 374, Mushegh acted as regent for the new king Varazdat (Varasdates). Varazdat attempted to free himself of Mamikonian tutelage by ordering Mushegh's murder and replacing him as sparapet with a non-Mamikonian noble, Smbat Saharuni.

On this event, the family leadership passed to Mushegh's brother, Manuel Mamikonian, who had formerly been kept as a hostage in Persia. The Mamikonians at once broke into insurrection and routed Varazdat and Saharuni at Karin. Varazdat fled abroad and Manuel installed the two underage sons of Pap, Vagharshak (Vologases) and Arshak as kings of Armenia under the formal regency of their mother, Zarmandukht. Manuel also married his daughter Vardandukht to Arshak III and accepted the suzerainty of the Sasanian Empire, as Roman power had effectively ended in the East following the defeat at Adrianople in 378. Armenia was to retain its autonomy but be overseen by a marzpan (governor) appointed by the Persian king. Manuel's death c. 385 precipitated the partition of Armenia between the Sasanians and the Romans. Pavstos writes that Manuel was succeeded by his son Artashir as sparapet.

Hamazasp Mamikonian is recorded as the family patriarch in 393. He married Sahakanoysh, daughter of Patriarch Isaac the Great. She was a descendant of the Arsacid kings and Saint Gregory the Illuminator. Through this marriage, the Mamikonians gained the western part of Taron centered on Ashtishat, as well as Bagrevand and Ekegheats (Acilisene). Hamazasp and Sahakanush's eldest child Vardan Mamikonian is revered for his leadership of the Armenian rebellion against Persia in 450/451 (called Vardanants’ paterazm in Armenian, meaning "the war of Vardan and his companions").

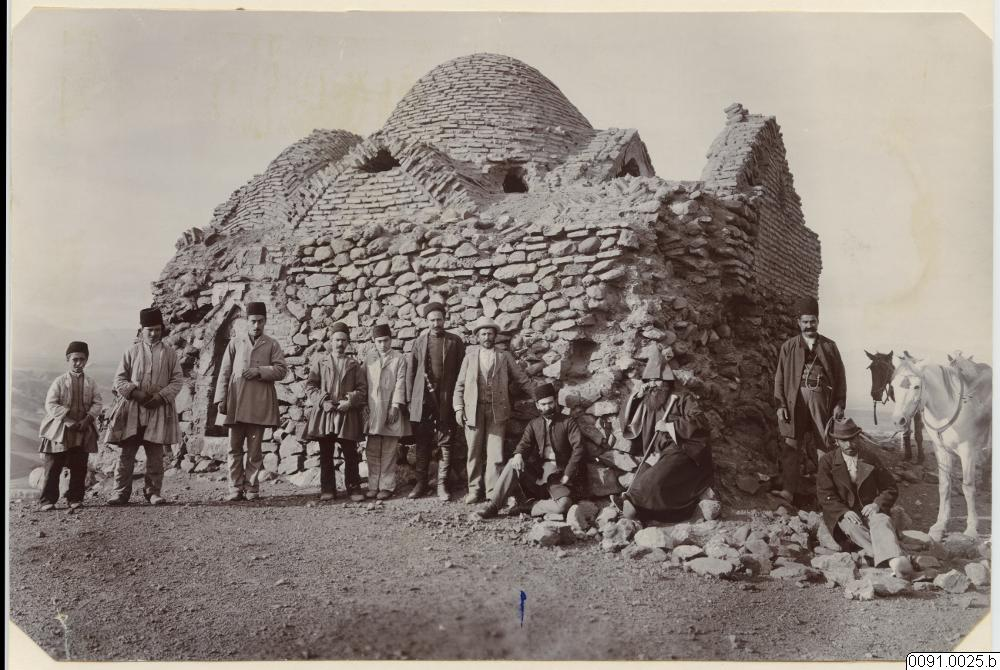
The Vardan Mamikonian tomb near Diza, Her (Khoy), norther Iran

After Vardan became sparapet in 432, the Persians summoned him to Ctesiphon. Upon his return home in 450, Vardan repudiated Zoroastrianism and instigated a great Armenian rebellion against their Sasanian overlords, provoked by Yazdegerd II's attempts to impose Zoroastrianism on Armenia and other outrages. The rebellion was opposed by a party of pro-Persian Armenian nobles led by marzpan Vasak Siwni. Although Vardan and many other leading Armenian noblemen died at the Battle of Avarayr in 451, the continued insurrection led by Vardan's nephew Vahan Mamikonian and the death of Peroz I resulted in the restoration of Armenian autonomy and religious rights with the Treaty of Nvarsak (484). Vahan was confirmed as sparapet by the Persians and appointed marzpan of Armenia in 485. Vardan Mamikonian, immortalized by the histories of Ghazar Parpetsi and Elishe, is venerated as a saint by the Armenian Church and commemorated by many churches in Armenia and an equestrian statue in Yerevan.

After the country's subjugation by the Persians, the Mamikonians often sided with the Eastern Roman Empire, with many family members entering Byzantine service, most notably Vardan II Mamikonian in the late 6th century after his failed revolt against Persia. Vardan's failed revolt marked the beginning of the decline of the Mamikonian dynasty in Armenia. The power of the Mamikonians waned further with the Arab conquest of Armenia in the late 7th century, especially relative to their great rivals, the Bagratunis (Bagratids), who were generally favored by the Arabs. Several Mamikonian nobles served as presiding princes of Armenia under Arab rule, but the house lost its traditional office of sparapet to the Bagratunis in the 8th century. Grigor Mamikonian led a rebellion against Arab rule but was defeated and forced to flee to Byzantium in ca. 748. By 750, the Mamikonians had lost Taron, Khlat, and Mush to the Bagratunis. In the 770s, the family was led by Artavazd Mamikonian, then by Mushegh IV Mamikonian (+772) and by Samuel II. The latter married his daughter to Smbat VII Bagratuni, constable of Armenia. His grandson Ashot Msaker ("the Carnivorous") became forefather of the Bagratuni rulers of Armenia and Taron.

== Decline ==
The final death-blow to the family's power came in the mid-770s with the defeat and death of Mushegh VI Mamikonian at the Battle of Bagrevand against the Abbasids. After the battle, Mushegh's two sons took refuge in Vaspurakan and were murdered by Meruzhan II Artsruni. Mushegh's daughter was married off to Djahap al-Qais, a tribal chief who settled in Armenia and seized part of the former Mamikonian lands and legalized it by marrying the daughter of Mushegh VI, the last living Mamikonian prince. This marriage created the Kaysite dynasty of Arminiya centered in Manzikert, the most powerful Muslim Arab emirate in the Armenian Highlands region, and thus ending the existence of the Mamikonian line in Armenia. Only secondary lines of the family survived thereafter, both in Transcaucasia and in Byzantium. Even in their homeland of Tayk, they were succeeded by the Bagratunis. One Kurdik Mamikonian was recorded as ruling Sasun c. 800, where the Surb Karapet Monastery and family seat was. Half a century later, Grigor Mamikonian lost Bagrevand to the Muslims, reconquered it in the early 860s and then lost it to the Bagratunis, permanently. After that, the Mamikonians pass out of history.

== Outside Armenia ==
After their disastrous uprising of 774–775, some of the Mamikonian princes moved to the Georgian lands. The latter-day Georgian feudal houses of the Liparitids-Orbeliani and Tumanishvili (Tumanian) are sometimes surmised to have been descended from those princes.

Several scholars—most notably Cyril Toumanoff and Nicholas Adontz—have suggested a Mamikonian origin for a number of leading Byzantine families and individuals, beginning with the emperor Philippikos Bardanes in the early-8th century, the general and usurper Artabasdos in the mid-8th century (741–743), the families of men like Alexios Mosele or Empress Theodora and her brothers Bardas and Petronas in the 9th century, and the Phokas family in the 10th century. However, as the Armenian historian Nina Garsoïan comments, "[a]ttractive though it is, this thesis cannot be proven for want of sources". Leslie Brubaker and John Haldon suggested emperor Philippicus (Bardanes) had some connection or affiliation with the Armenian Mamikonians.

== Genealogy ==
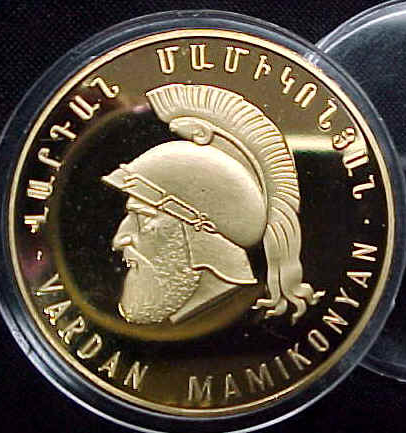
Republic of Armenia coin depicting Vardan Mamikonian

The history of Mamikonians in the Early Middle Ages is quite obscure. In the period between 655 and 750 they are not documented at all. What follows below is their reconstructed genealogy between the 5th and 7th centuries.

Hamazasp I Mamikonian, married to Sahakanoysh of Armenia
1. Vardan I (+451) (saint)
1.1. Shushanik (+October 17, 475, Tsurtavi, Georgia) (saint)
2. Hmayeak I (+June 02, 451, in Tayk, region, Armenia)
2.1. Vahan
2.1.1. Vard
2.2. Vasak
2.2.1. Manuel
2.2.1.1. Gaghik
2.2.2. Vardan II
2.2.2.3. Mamak (fl. 590)
2.2.3 daughter
2.2.3.1. Mushegh II (+c. 593)
2.2.3.1.1. Kahan Gail (fl. 592-604)
2.2.3.1.1.1. Smbat the Valiant (fl. 604)
2.2.3.1.1.1.1. Mushegh III (+636)
2.2.3.1.1.1.1.1. Grigor I (fl. 650)
2.2.3.1.1.1.1.2. Hamazasp II (fl. 655)
2.3. Artashes
2.4. Vard
3. Hamazaspian

== Necropolis ==
The Surb Karapet Monastery in Taron, near Mush, housed tombs of several Mamikonian princes as it was the dynasty's sepulchral abbey. The tombs of Mushegh, Vahan the Wolf, Smbat and Vahan Kamsarakan were located near the southern wall of the monastery.

== See also ==
- Vardan Mamikonian
- Saint Shushanik
- Battle of Avarayr
- Union of the Armenian Noblemen
- Sophie Audouin-Mamikonian – French former pretender to the throne of the ancient Kingdom of Armenia

== Sources ==
- Bedrosian, Robert (1981). "China and the Chinese according to 5-13th Century Classical Armenian Sources". Armenian Review. 34 (1–133): 17–24.
- Bedrosian, Robert (1983). "The Sparapetut'iwn in Armenia in the Fourth and Fifth Centuries" (PDF). Armenian Review. 36 (2): 6–46.
- Garsoïan, Nina (1997). "The Aršakuni Dynasty". In Hovannisian, Richard G. (ed.). The Armenian People from Ancient to Modern Times. Vol. 1. New York: St. Martin's Press. ISBN 0-312-10169-4.
- Garsoian, Nina (2005). "MAMIKONEAN FAMILY". Encyclopaedia Iranica.
- Garsoïan, Nina G. (1991). "Mamikonean". In Kazhdan, Alexander (ed.). The Oxford Dictionary of Byzantium. Oxford and New York: Oxford University Press. ISBN 0-19-504652-8.
- Moses Khorenats'i (1978). History of the Armenians. Translated by Thomson, Robert W. Cambridge, Massachusetts & London: Harvard University Press. ISBN 0-674-39571-9.
- P'awstos Buzand (1985). History of the Armenians. Translated by Bedrosian, Robert.
- Toumanoff, Cyril (1963). Studies in Christian Caucasian History. Georgetown University Press. OCLC 505712128.
- Toumanoff, Cyril (1969). "The Mamikonids and the Liparitids". Armeniaca. Venice: 125–137.
