= Maskut =

Group of tribes that lived in the eastern Caucasus

Map of the Caucasus in the 5th-century. The Maskut lived between Derbent and Shaporan

The Maskut (also known as Mazkut, Muskur) were a group of Massagetaen-Sarmato-Alanian tribes located in the eastern part of the Caucasus, along the western coast of the Caspian Sea. They lived between Derbent and Shaporan, which corresponds to present-day northeast Azerbaijan and southeast Dagestan (Russia). The name "Maskut" is also sometimes used to refer to a geographic area, rather than an ethnic group. The first wave of these tribes arrived in the 3rd-century from the Volga–Don Canal and the northern coast of the Caspian Sea. The modern Russian-Dagestani historian Murtazali Gadjiev suggests that these tribes had immigrated as a result of not only climate changes and longing to explore new regions, but as well as due to concurrent conflicts.

The Sarmato-Alan burial sites in Dagestan between the 3rd and 5th centuries are regarded as part of the Maskut settlement. In 216, these tribes attacked Armenia, and also participated in the war between Armenia and Sasanian Iran in the mid 3rd-century. An unnamed king of the Maskut, along with other Caucasian rulers, is mentioned in the Middle Persian Paikuli inscription of the Sasanian King of Kings (shahanshah) Narseh (r. 293–303). In the inscription, Maskut is transliterated in Middle Persian as mskyt'n (mas(a)kitan / mas(a)ketan) which is identical to the Greek Μασσᾰγέται and Latin Massagetae. In the first half of the 4th-century, a second wave of Sarmato-Alanian tribes from the northwestern Caspian coast along with a group of Alans from the North Caucasus started to migrate to Maskut.

In c. 440, Maskut was briefly seized by the Huns led by Attila (r. 434–453), which is also reflected by the contemporary Armenian historian Elishe's choice to refer Derbent as a "Hun fortress, "Hun garrison", and "Hun Gate." Shahanshah Yazdegerd II (r. 438–457) retaliated by leading two military expeditions against the Huns in Maskut, recapturing Derbent and heavily fortifying it afterwards.

According to the 10th-century Arab historian al-Masudi (died 956), the shahanshah Kavad I (r. 488–496, 498/9–531) had a "town built of stone" in the Maskut settlement. The location of this town, however, is uncertain.

== Sources ==
- Gadjiev, Murtazali (2017). Construction Activities of Kavād I in Caucasian Albania. Brill. pp. 121–131.
- Gadjiev, Murtazali (2020). "The Chronology of the Arsacid Albanians". In Hoyland, Robert (ed.). From Albania to Arrān: The East Caucasus between the Ancient and Islamic Worlds (ca. 330 BCE–1000 CE). Gorgias Press. pp. 29–35. ISBN 978-1463239886.
- Gadjiev, Murtazali (2021). "Armenia and the Land of the Mazkut' (3rd–5th Centuries AD): Written Sources and Archaeological Data". Electrum. 28: 207–219. doi:10.4467/20800909EL.21.014.13372.
