= List of marzbans =

Marzban was an official title for a political and/or military leader in charge of a border province of the Parthian or Sasanian Empire.

== List of Sasanian marzbans ==
List of recorded marzobans
Marzban	location	king
Adarmahan	a Western province, probably Nisibis	
Nabedes	Nisibis	
Aparviz of Sistan	Sakastan	
Bahram Chobin	Ray	
Burzin Shah	Nishapur	
Mahoe Suri	Marw	
Varsken	Gugark	
Adhur Gushnasp	Armenia	
Chihor-Vishnasp	Armenia	
Golon Mihran	Armenia	
Mushegh II Mamikonian	Armenia	
Vahan Mamikonian	Armenia	
Vard Mamikonian	Armenia	
Mjej I Gnuni	Armenia	
Rhahzadh	Armenia	
Sahak II Bagratuni	Armenia	
Shahraplakan	Armenia	
Shapur Mihran	Armenia	
Smbat IV Bagratuni	Armenia	
Tamkhosrau	Armenia	
Tan-Shapur	Armenia	
Varaz Vzur	Armenia	
Varazdat	Armenia	
Varaztirots II Bagratuni	Armenia	
Vasak of Syunik	Armenia	
Veh Mihr Shapur	Armenia	
Zarmihr Hazarwuxt	Armenia	
Mihrzād	al-Hira (Wall of the Arabs)	Shapur I
Ōšag, of Hagar	Do-sar and Borg-gil by the Wall of the Arabs	Ardashir I
Iyas ibn Qabisah al-Ta'i and Nakhiragan	al-Hira	Khosrow II
Azadbeh	al-Hira	Khosrow II
Vistahm	Gurgan	Khosrow II
Smbat IV Bagratuni	Gurgan	Khosrow II
