= Shapur Mihran =

- 𐭱𐭧𐭯𐭥𐭧𐭥𐭩 𐭬𐭲𐭥
- Relatives: Mihran (father), Peroz I (foster brother)
- Military career
- Allegiance: Sasanian Empire
- Commands: Marzban
- Conflicts: Battle of Akesga

Shapur Mihran (Middle Persian: 𐭱𐭧𐭯𐭥𐭧𐭥𐭩 𐭬𐭲𐭥), known in Armenian sources as Shapuh Mihran (Armenian: Շապուհ Միհրան), was a Sasanian nobleman from the House of Mihran. He served as the marzban of Persian Armenia briefly in 482.

== Biography ==
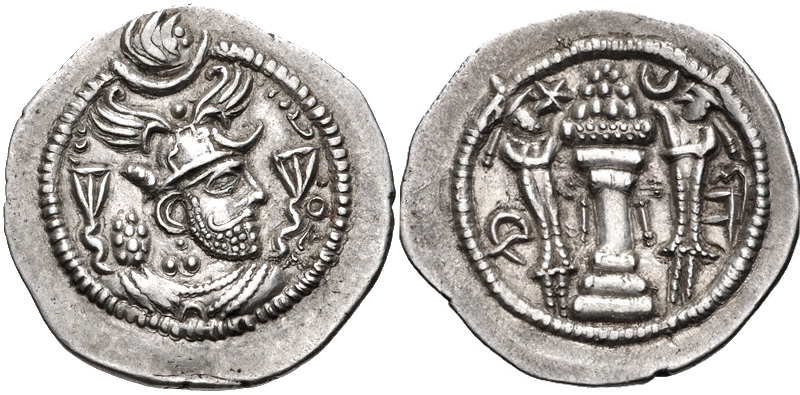
Coin of Peroz I.

Shapur belonged to the House of Mihran, one of the Seven Parthian clans; he was the son of a certain Mihran. He was a foster brother of the Sasanian shah Peroz I, who was himself married to a princess from the Mihran family. During the reign of Peroz, the Mihran family enjoyed a high status, and played an important role in Sasanian politics. Shapur, during his youth, was raised in Armenia, which made him, unlike other Sasanian nobles, act more tolerant towards Christianity.

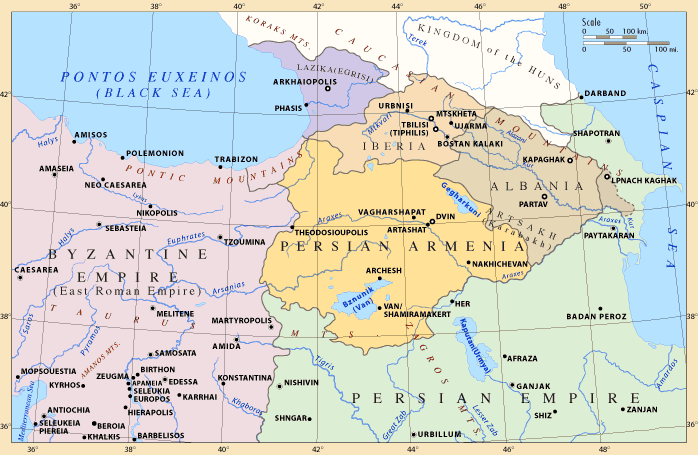
Map of Persian Armenia.

In 475, the Mamikonian princess Shushanik was murdered by her husband Prince Varsken, who was a convert to Zoroastrianism, and related to the Mihran family. The reason for this murder was because she had refused to convert to Zoroastrianism and wanted to stay Christian. Varsken, because of his actions, was in 482 executed by Vakhtang I, king of Iberia. Peroz I sent an army to punish Vakhtang for intervening. However, Vakhtang was joined by the Armenians, and a revolt broke out in Armenia, led by Vahan I Mamikonian.

Peroz I, eager to avenge Varsken, sent his general Shapur Mihran to Iberia. To defend himself, Vakhtang appealed to the Huns and the Armenian nobles, citing solidarity between Christians. After carefully weighing the decision, Vahan Mamikonian agreed to revolt against the Sasanians. He defeated the marzban Adhur Gushnasp, and declared Sahak II Bagratuni as the new marzban. He also kept defeating several Sasanian counter-attacks.

In 482, Shapur Mihran began to become a big threat to the security of Iberia, which made Vakhtang request Armenian help. Vahan and Sahak shortly arrived to Iberia at the head of a big army, but were defeated in Akesga, where Sahak was killed. Vahan fled with the remnants of the Armenian army into the mountains, where he led guerrilla actions against the Sasanians, while Shapur managed to regain control of Armenia. However, Shapur was shortly ordered to return to the Sasanian capital of Ctesiphon. Vahan quickly used the opportunity to regain control of Armenia.

In the spring of 484, however, Shapur Mihran returned as the head of a new army and forced Vahan to flee to refuge near the Byzantine frontier, at Tao and Taron. During the same period, the Sasanian noble Zarmihr Karen from the Karenid family, was also successful in a campaign against the Armenians, and managed to capture several of them, including nobles from the Kamsarakan family. Zarmihr shortly delivered the Armenian captives to Shapur, who delivered them to Izad Gushnasp, and promised the Armenian captives to make Peroz spare them.

During the same period, several of Shapur's relatives, including his father Mihran, were summoned by Peroz to aid him in his campaigns against in Central Asia against the Hephthalites. However, the campaign ended disastrously, and all of the Sasanian army, including Peroz and Mihran, were exterminated.

After hearing about the death of Peroz I, Shapur left Caucasus and returned to Ctesiphon, in order to protect the Sasanian Empire from the Hephthalites and to elect a new king. Balash, the brother of Peroz I, was crowned as the new king of the Sasanian Empire. However, it was in reality the father of Zarmihr Karen, Sukhra who exercised real power over the Sasanian Empire. After this event, Shapur is no longer mentioned in any sources.

== Sources ==
- Schindel, Nikolaus (2013). "KAWĀD I i. Reign". Encyclopaedia Iranica, Vol. XVI, Fasc. 2. pp. 136–141.
- Pourshariati, Parvaneh (2008). Decline and Fall of the Sasanian Empire: The Sasanian-Parthian Confederacy and the Arab Conquest of Iran. London and New York: I.B. Tauris. ISBN 978-1-84511-645-3.
- Grousset, René (1947). Histoire de l'Arménie des origines à 1071 (in French). Paris: Payot.

Preceded by Sahak II Bagratuni	Marzban of Persian Armenia; 482	Succeeded by Vahan Mamikonian
