= Vahan II Mamikonian =

Sparapet Hazarapet Vahan Mamikonian
- Վահան Մամիկոնեան
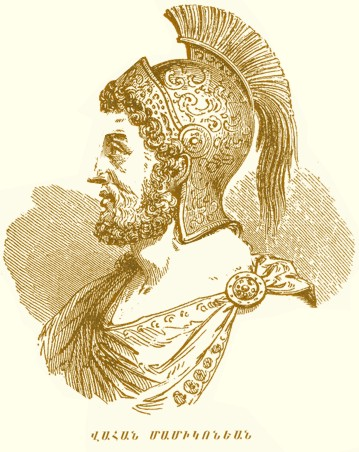
- Modern artistic portrayal of Vahan

Marzban of Persian Armenia
- In office 485–503/510
- Monarch: Kavadh I
- Preceded by: Shapur of Ray
- Succeeded by: Vard Mamikonian

Personal details
- Born: 440–445 Marzpanate Armenia
- Died: 503–510 Marzpanate Armenia

Military service
- Rank: Sparapet
- Battles/wars: Vahan's War; Battle of Akori; Battle of Nersehapat; Battle of Akesga

Vahan Mamikonian (Armenian: Վահան Մամիկոնեան; c. 440/445 – 503/510) was an Armenian nobleman from the Mamikonian family. In 481 he rebelled against the Sasanian Empire that controlled the eastern part of Armenia known as Persian Armenia. He was appointed as marzban (governor) of Persian Armenia in 485 and remained in that post until his death around 503–510.

== Background ==
From 387 the kingdom of Armenia was divided into two zones of influence, Byzantine Armenia and Persian Armenia. In 428 the last Arsacid Armenian monarch, Artaxias IV, was deposed by his overlord Bahram V at the request of the Armenian nakharars, thus starting the Marzpanate period in Persian Armenia. Very quickly, the Armenians were disillusioned: in 449, Yazdegerd II ordered the nobility to convert to Zoroastrianism. The Armenians revolted under the leadership of Vardan Mamikonian, but were defeated on 2 June 451 (or May 26) at the battle of Avarayr; most nakharars who participated in the revolt were deported to Ctesiphon.

== Youth ==
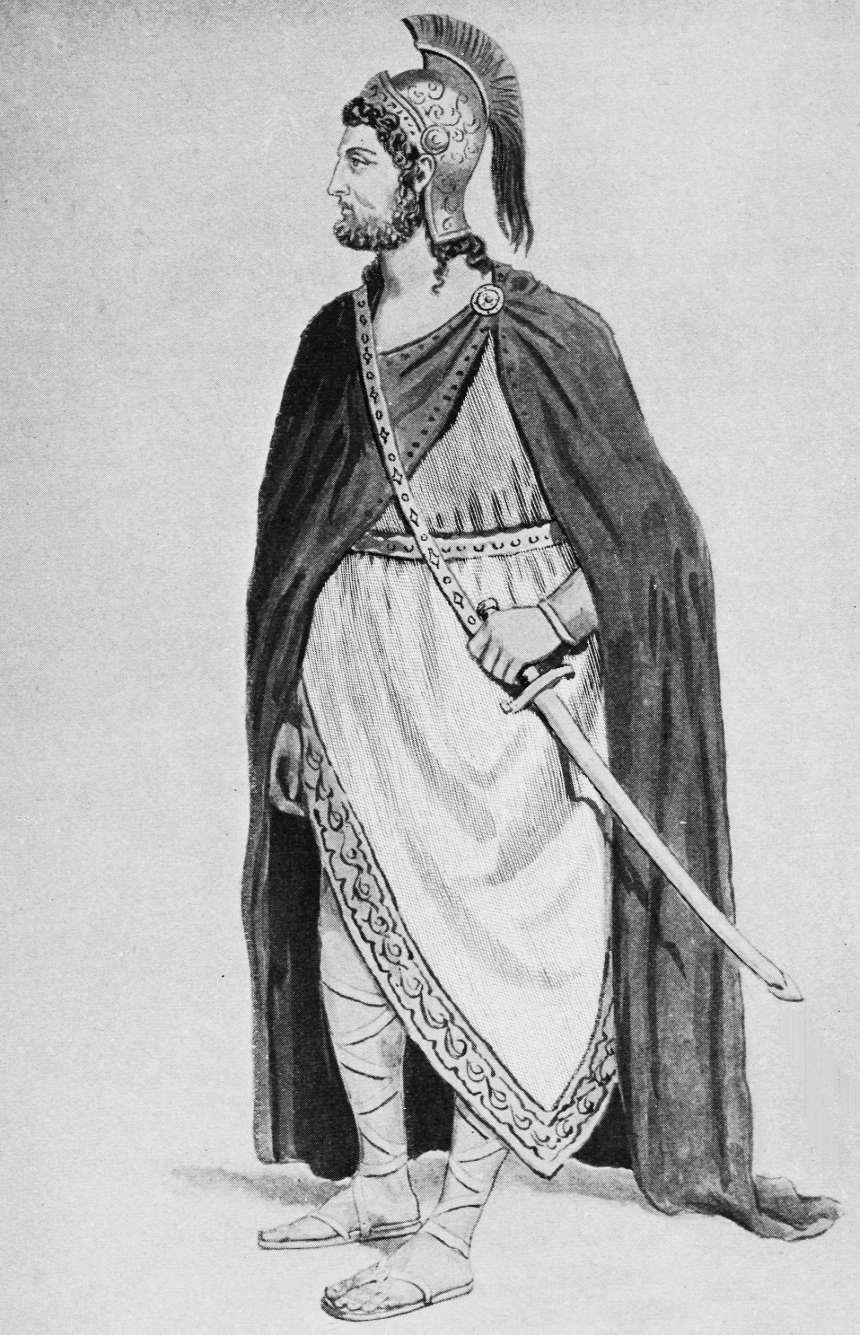
Illustration of Vahan Mamikonyan in the 1898 book Illustrated Armenia and Armenians

Vahan was born around 440 - 445. He was the eldest son of Hmayeak Mamikonian and Dzoyk, he had 3 younger siblings named Vard, Vasak, and Artaxias. His father was killed by guerrillas at Tayk in the aftermath of the battle of Avarayr. Vahan, along with Vasak and Artaxias, was captured by the marzban of Armenia and was deported to Ctesiphon; sentenced to apostasy, and was "weakened in their faith," according to his childhood friend and contemporary historian Ghazar Parpetsi.

The three brothers were sentenced to death, however, were released with the help of Mihranid prince Arshusha II. Vahan then regained his possessions, however, he was accused of misappropriation of income of gold mines, and had to pay a large sum of money to the Sasanians.

== Revolt ==
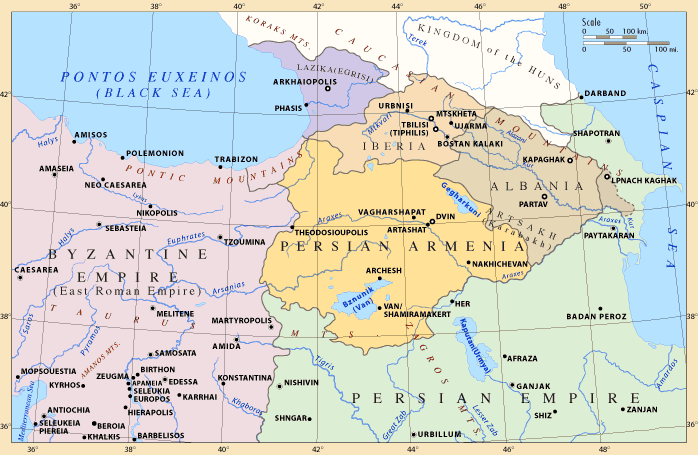
Map of Persian Armenia

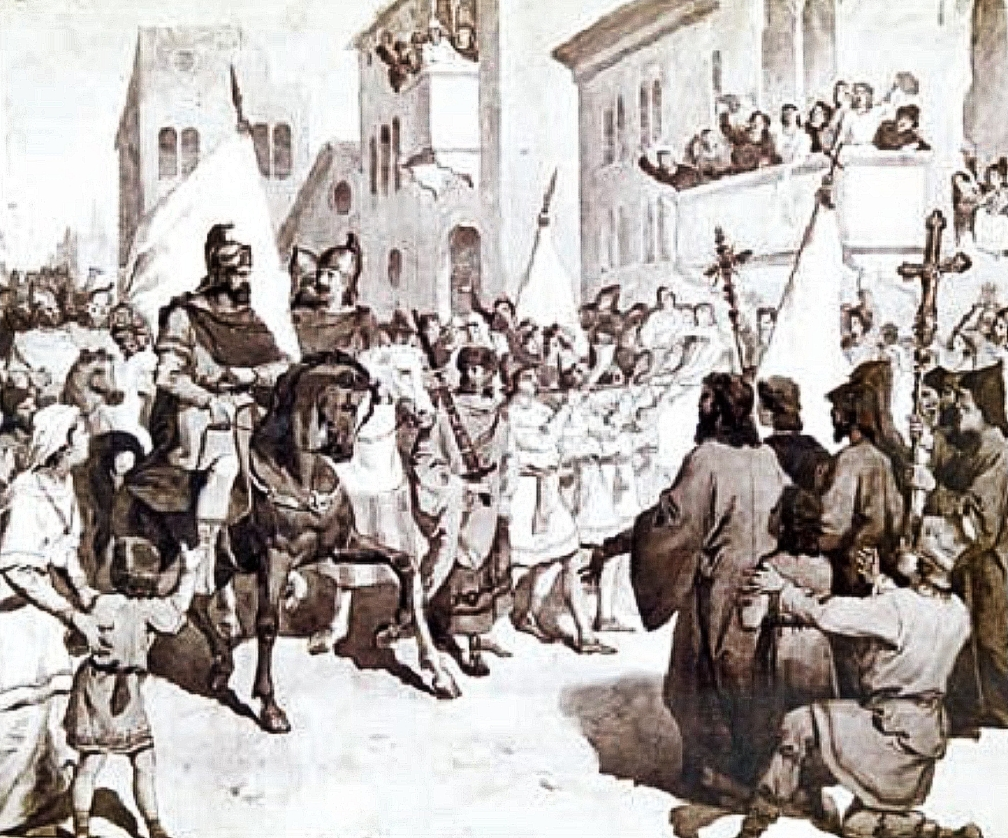
Vahan's arrival to Dvin

In the aftermath of battle of Avarayr, the Armenians were constantly ordered by the Sasanians to go to distant military expeditions, mostly in Eastern Persia. They were also required to accept the growing power of the apostasy, which resulted in the revolt of Vakhtang I of Iberia (r. 447/449 - 502/522), and was positively received by the Armenians. Vahan hesitated to join the rebellion in 481, making Adhur Gushnasp, the marzban of Armenia, abandon Dvin and take refuge in Artashat.

Vahan then asked the other rebels to take an oath on the cross of the Gospel to remain faithful to the covenant he would proclaim as the new marzban of Armenia, and proclaimed Sahak II Bagratuni as the new marzban. However, Adhur Gushnasp returned from refuge with a force of 7000 horsemen against the insurgents, he was, however, defeated and killed by Vahan and his army at the battle at Akori (northern slope of Mount Ararat). Vahan henceforth remained in Dvin to protect the capital; in early 483, Sasanian reinforcements came, however, Vahan managed to defeat them at the battle of Nersehapat in Artaz (region of Maku.)

Vahan then received a letter from Vakhtang, who was with his troops near the Kura river searching after the Sasanian army under Shapur Mihran. Crazed by the lack of promised reinforcements, the Armenians were defeated in 483 at the battle of Akesga that among other consequences, caused the death of Sahak II Bagratuni and Vahan's brother, Vasak Mamikonian. Vahan then went to Tao while Shapur Mihran was returning to Ctesiphon, allowing the Armenians regain control of the Arax river during winter. In the spring of 484, Shapur Mihran returned as the head of a new army and forced Vahan to flee to refuge near the Byzantine frontier, at Tao and Taron.

== Marzban of Armenia ==
However, the death of the Sasanian king Peroz I in 484 in war against the Hephthalites caused the withdrawal of the Persians in Armenia and the recovery of Dvin and Vagharshapat. Struggling to suppress the revolt of his brother Zarir, Peroz's successor, Balash (r. 484-488), needed the help of the Armenians: in exchange for military support, he agreed to sign the Nvarsak Treaty, which granted religious freedom to the Christians and the prohibition of Zoroastrianism in Armenia, and included much greater autonomy for the nakharars. Vahan was also recognized as sparapet and the property of the Mamikonian family and its allies were returned.

During the same period, Vahan was appointed as marzban in 485, and appointed his brother Vard as sparapet. According to John I Mandakuni and Babgeno, Christianity flourished during his reign; churches were restored and rebuilt, most notably Vagharshapat (Etchmiadzin) Cathedral. The country enjoyed relative peace, despite the failed attempt of the successor of Balash, Kavadh I (r. 488-496, 499-531), to impose on the propositions of Nevarsak. In 489, Vahan along with Vachagan III, King of Albania, repelled an Hephthalite invasion of Transcaucasia. Vahan died between 503 and 510 and was succeeded by his brother Vard Mamikonian. According to Cyril Toumanoff, Vahan Mamikonian hypothetically would have been the father of Artavasdes, the father of Samuel I, who was a sparapet in 555.

== Family tree ==
Hmayeak Mamikonian	Dzoyk Artsruni
Artaxias	Vasak	Vahan Mamikonian	Vard Mamikonian
Artavasdes
Samuel

== Bibliography ==
- Dédéyan, Gérard (2007). History of the Armenian people. Tolosa: Privat. ISBN 978-2-7089-6874-5.
- Donabédian, Patrick; Jean-Michel Thierry (1987). Les arts arméniens. Paris: Éditions Mazenod. ISBN 2-85088-017-5.
- Grousset, René (1947). Histoire de l'Arménie des origines à 1071. Paris.
- Jacobus, Donald Lines (1993). The American Genealogist, Volumes 68-69. Universidade de Wisconsin - Madison: D.L. Jacobus.
- Mutafian, Claude; Éric Van Lauwe (2005). Atlas historique de l'Arménie. Autrement. ISBN 978-2746701007.
- Settipani, Christian (2006). Continuité des élites à Byzance durant les siècles obscurs. Les princes caucasiens et l'Empire du vie au ixe siècle. Paris: de Boccard. ISBN 978-2-7018-0226-8.
- Toumanoff, Cyril (1990). As dinastias do Cáucaso cristão na Antiguidade ao século XIX: tabelas genealógicas e cronológicas. Rome.
- Yarshater, Ehsan (1983). The Cambridge History of Iran: The Seleucid, Parthian, and Sasanian periods. Cambridge University Press. ISBN 052120092X.

Preceded by Shapur of Ray	Marzban of Persian Armenia; 485–503/510	Succeeded by Vard Mamikonian
