= Mjej I Gnuni =

Sasanian marzban

- Մժեժ Ա Գնունի

Marzban of Persian Armenia
- In office 518–548
- Monarch: Kavadh I Khosrow I
- Preceded by: Unknown
- Succeeded by: Gushnasp Bahram

Personal details
- Born: Unknown
- Died: Unknown Marzpanate Armenia

Mjej I Gnuni (Armenian: Մժեժ Ա Գնունի) was an Armenian nobleman from the Gnuni family who served as the marzban of Persian Armenia from 518 to 548.

Between 515 and 516, several Hunnic tribes made incursions into Armenia. Mjej then decided to organize a counterattack and successfully repelled them. As a reward, the Sassanian shah Kavadh I appointed him as the marzban of Armenia in 518. According to the twelfth-century history Samuel Anetsi: "after the patrician Vard Mamikonian, brother of Vahan, the Persian marzbans ruled Armenia for 11 years. The government of Armenia then passed to Mjej of the Gnuni family, who held it for thirty years". During this period, Mjej maintained religious peace. In 527, he repelled other Hunnic invasions. In 548, he was succeeded by Gushnasp Bahram.

== Sources ==
- Toumanoff, Cyrille (1990). "Vice-rois iraniens (Marzpans) d'Arménie". Les dynasties de la Caucasie chrétienne de l'Antiquité jusqu'au xixe siècle : Tables généalogiques et chronologiques (in French). Rome. pp. 506–507.
- Settipani, Christian (2006). Continuité des élites à Byzance durant les siècles obscurs. Les princes caucasiens et l'Empire du vie au ixe siècle (in French). Paris: de Boccard. ISBN 978-2-7018-0226-8.
- Dédéyan, Gérard (2007). Histoire du peuple arménien (in French). Toulouse: Éd. Privat. ISBN 978-2-7089-6874-5.

Preceded by Several Persian marzbans	Marzban of Persian Armenia; 518–548	Succeeded by Gushnasp Bahram
