= Izad Gushnasp =

Izad Gushnasp, known in Armenian sources as Yezatvshnasp, and in Islamic Iranian sources as Yazdan, was a Sasanian nobleman of Parthian or Daylamite origin, who is mostly known for his wars in Persian Armenia.

== Origins ==
According to Armenian sources, Izad Gushnasp was a member of the House of Mihran, and the son of a certain Ashtat. According to the Armenian historian Ghazar Parpetsi, Izad Gushnasp was also the foster brother of the Sasanian king (shah) Peroz I, who was the son of shah Yazdegerd II. However, according to the Iranian historian Ibn Isfandiyar, Izad Gushnasp and Ashtat were brothers from Daylam in northern Iran, but due to falling out with one of the most prominent and powerful noble of the Wuzurgan class in Daylam, had to leave the region and settle further east in Mazandaran.

== Biography ==
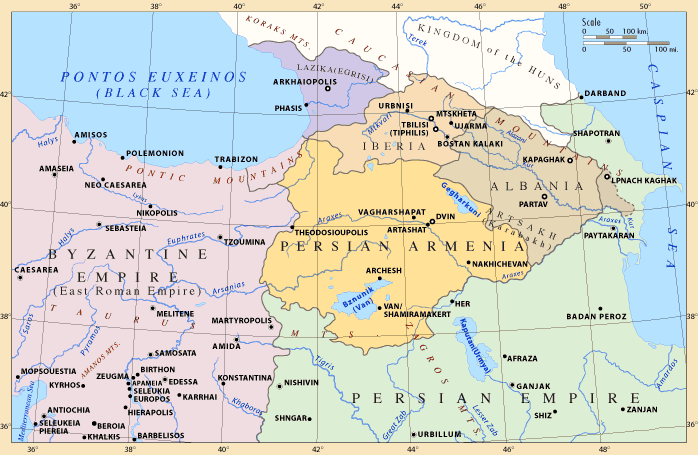
Map of Persian Armenia.

In 451, the Christian Armenians, who were under constant persecution by the Sasanian shah Yazdegerd II, revolted against the latter under their leader Vardan Mamikonian. Izad Gushnasp, along with Ashtat, played a prominent role in the suppression of the revolt. They managed to capture several Armenian nobles along with their priest, and had them imprisoned in Nishapur. During the reign of Yazdegerd's son Peroz I, Izad Gushnasp was in ca. 464 ordered to take the imprisoned Armenians to Herat to use them in their army. Izad Gushnasp is later mentioned as the commander of Bolberd, a fortress northeast to the city of Karin. The fortress had many gold mines, which was greatly important for the Sasanians to protect from the Byzantines. During this period, the relations between Izad Gushnasp's family and Peroz I was flourishing, and Peroz even later married the daughter of Ashtat.

In 482, the Armenians along with the Iberians, rebelled against the Sasanians. Peroz I responded by sending several armies to subdue the rebels. Some time later, the Sasanian noble Zarmihr Karen from the Karenid family, was successful in a campaign against the Armenians, and managed to capture several of them, including nobles from the Kamsarakan family. Zarmihr shortly delivered the Armenian captives to another general named Shapur Mihran, who delivered them to Izad Gushnasp at Bolberd. After this event, Izad Gushnasp is no longer mentioned in any source.

== Sources ==
- Pourshariati, Parvaneh (2008). Decline and Fall of the Sasanian Empire: The Sasanian-Parthian Confederacy and the Arab Conquest of Iran. London and New York: I.B. Tauris. ISBN 978-1-84511-645-3.
