= Smbat III Bagratuni =

Smbat III Bagratuni Սմբատ Գ Բագրատունի
- Predecessor: Sahak I Bagratuni
- Successor: Tirots Bagratuni
- Dynasty: Bagratuni
- Father: Sahak I Bagratuni

Smbat III Bagratuni (Armenian: Սմբատ Գ Բագրատունի) was an Armenian prince of the 5th century from the Bagratuni dynasty. He was probably the son of Sahak I Bagratuni. His princely domain was the district of Sper in Upper Armenia. He was the brother of the wife of the Armenian king Varshak (son of Pap). He held the hereditary office of Tagadir Aspet (“Crown-Bearing Cavalry Commander”) during the reigns of the Armenian kings Vramshapuh (389–415) and Khosrov IV (415–416), as well as during the rule of Shapur the Persian (416–420). He crowned Shapur the Persian and also the last Arsacid king, Artaxias IV (422–428). He is considered to have been the father of Tirots Bagratuni.

The Bagratunis received hereditary nakharar status from the Armenian Arsacid kings in the 4th century. They were entrusted with the royal office of Tagadir Aspet. Their domains included the district of Sper in the province of Upper Armenia, which was famous for its rich gold deposits, as well as the province of Tayk. The earliest known representative was Smbat I, who held the office of Tagadir Aspet during the reign of Tiridates III the Great (287–330).

The descendants of Smbat III continued to hold prominent positions in Armenia, which was divided between the Roman Empire and Sasanian Persia. Among his descendants, Tirots was an ideological associate of Vasak Syuni, the marzpan known from Armenian history, while Sahak II and, later, Smbat IV served as marzpans of Armenia. The patriarchs of the Bagratuni dynasty traditionally held the office of Aspet.

== History ==
Khosrov IV ruled Armenia under Sasanian suzerainty from 384/385 to 389 and again from 414 to 415, or according to another chronology, from 417 to 418. He was an Arsacid king of Greater Armenia in 387–392. After the death of Manuel Mamikonian, the regent of King Arsaces III, at the request of the Armenian nakharars, the Persian king Shapur III placed the young Khosrov on the Armenian throne, marrying him to his sister Zruandukht and appointing a Persian nobleman from the Zik family as his guardian.

In 388, he was succeeded by his brother Khosrov IV. King Vramshapuh, taking advantage of the political balance that had emerged between Sasanian Persia and the Roman Empire, established friendly relations with the courts of both powers. His quarter-century reign (389–414) is characterized as a period of peace and construction, which contributed to the country's internal prosperity. Under Vramshapuh's patronage, Armenian education and culture flourished, laying the foundations for the Golden Age of Armenian history and the creation of the Armenian script. He is also known for his successful peace-making mission in Mesopotamia, where he mediated between Persia and Byzantium. Vramshapuh succeeded in gaining the confidence of both the Sasanian shah and the pro-Roman Armenians. Under his patronage, Sahak I Parthev was soon restored to the Catholicosal See, while Mesrop Mashtots was elected his coadjutor. The Armenian Gahnamak (“Book of Thrones”) was reorganized, and, in accordance with the new political circumstances, the positions and offices of the nakharar houses within the country's administrative system were regulated. Vramshapuh sent the revised Gahnamak to Ctesiphon and obtained its recognition by the Persian court. At the request of Sahak Parthev, Vramshapuh also granted the Mamikonian family the fifth rank in the Gahnamak and appointed his son-in-law, Hamazasp Mamikonian, as sparapet. Vramshapuh also appointed the mardpet, the guardian of the royal harem who was also responsible for administering the royal estates, and the asp et, who placed the crown on Vramshapuh's head during his coronation. Little is known about the remaining years of Vramshapuh's reign after the creation of the Armenian alphabet. According to some sources, he died in 417, leaving his son Artaxias IV, who was still too young at the time to succeed his father.

During the reigns of Vramshapuh and Khosrov IV, according to later tradition, Smbat III Bagratuni held the hereditary office of aspēt of the Bagratuni dynasty. His participation in specific political, diplomatic, cultural, or other events that took place during the reigns of Vramshapuh and Khosrov IV is not directly mentioned in contemporary primary sources. Thus, his office should be understood as a high-ranking hereditary position within the royal court and the Armenian nakharar system.

In 416, following the death of the Armenian Arsacid king Khosrov IV, the Persian Sasanian king Yazdegerd I appointed his son Shapur as king of Armenia. According to Movses Khorenatsi, the Armenian nakharars constantly mocked and treated Shapur with contempt. In 419, internal unrest broke out in Iran, and Shapur went to Iran to assist his father, where he was killed together with him.

After ascending the throne, Artaxias IV called himself Artashir, in honor of former Sasanian kings. Following his uncle and father, Artaxias IV became the third Sasanian vassal ruler of eastern Armenia, governing as a Christian monarch subject to the Zoroastrian state.

As king, Artaxias IV had the support of the reigning Catholicos Sahak. Although Artaxias IV was recognized by the nakharars as their king, the centrifugal tendencies of the aristocracy were beyond his control. Leading members of the nobility soon resumed their intrigues, using the young king's alleged vices as a pretext. Because of his youth and weakness of character, Artaxias IV was unable to overcome the problems associated with the Armenian aristocracy. At various times, Sahak called upon the nakharars to respect the supreme authority of the king, cooperate with him, and act as his allies, but these appeals were ignored.

The nakharars lost confidence in the Armenian monarchy and concluded that direct Persian rule would be preferable to vassalage. At the request of the nakharars, Artaxias IV was deposed by Bahram V in 428. Armenia was annexed and became a marzpanate of the Persian Empire. The Sasanians appointed Vehmihrshapuh as marzpan of Persian Armenia. The subsequent fate of Artaxias IV is unknown. His deposition marked the end of Armenian rule by the Arsacid dynasty.

Smbat III was a member of the Bagratuni dynasty and, according to later accounts, held the office of aspēt. This placed him among the highest-ranking positions within the Armenian nakharar system. In the process of Artaxias IV's accession to the throne, Smbat III is presented as a representative of the Armenian noble circles. According to the tradition preserved concerning the Bagratunis, Smbat III's coronation of Artaxias IV should be understood within the framework of the Bagratunis’ hereditary right to serve as crown-bearers.

== Bibliography ==
- Cyrille Toumanoff, Les dynasties de la Caucasie chrétienne de l'Antiquité jusqu'au xixe siècle; Tables généalogiques et chronologiques, Rome, 1990.
- Payot Histoire de l’Arménie des origines à 1071 / René Grousset. — Rome, 1947.
- Մովսես Խորենացի, Հայոց Պատմություն, Երևան, 1991։
- Ղազար Փարպեցի, Պատմություն Հայոց, Երևան, 1982։

Preceded by Sahak I Bagratuni	Bagratid Kingdom of Armenia prince of Sper Smbat III Bagratuni; 5th century	Succeeded by Tirotz Bagratuni
