= Battle of Nersehapat =

Date	482 AD
Location	North-West Iran
Result	Armenian victory

Belligerents
Marzpanate Armenia	Sasanian Empire

Commanders and leaders
Vahan I Mamikonian	

Casualties and losses
Light	Heavy

The Battle of Nersehapat was a battle fought in 482–483 AD during Vahan's War, between Marzpanate Armenia and Sasanian Empire. It took place near Nersehapat. This battle was preceded by the Battle of Akori.

== Background ==
The Armenians, led by Vahan Mamikonian, rebelled against Persian rule and efforts to strengthen Zoroastrian influence in Armenia. The battle resulted in Armenian victory. The revolt continued the struggle that had begun decades earlier with the famous Battle of Avarayr.

The Persians attacked and overwhelmed the Armenian right flank, causing it to scatter. In response, the commander decided to commit the reserve troops in an effort to restore the position. He ordered Vren Vanandetsi to cover the right wing, but Vren reportedly asked the commander not to rely on him.

Meanwhile, Vahan Mamikonian, together with the Kamsarakan brothers, launched a successful attack against the Persians and managed to break through their lines. The tide of the battle then turned in favor of the Armenians, and the Persian army fled in panic. Victory ultimately belonged to the Armenians.

The Armenian army's celebration was further heightened after the battle when the commander's brother, Vard Mamikonian, who had been held hostage in Persia, unexpectedly appeared. He had successfully escaped captivity and returned to his countrymen.

The aim of the war was the religious conversion of Armenians, which the Sasanians renounced with the Treaty of Nvarsak
