= Vard Mamikonian =

Armenian noble

- Վարդ Մամիկոնյան

Marzban of Persian Armenia
- In office 505/510–509/514
- Monarch: Kavadh I
- Preceded by: Vahan I Mamikonian
- Succeeded by: Several Persian Marzbans

Personal details
- Born: 450
- Died: 509/514

Vard Mamikonian (Armenian: Վարդ Մամիկոնյան) was an Armenian nobleman from the Mamikonian family. He served as the marzban of Persian Armenia from 505/510 to 509/514.

== Biography ==
Vard Mamikonian was the third son of Hmayeak Mamikonian and Dzoyk Artsruni. He had an elder brother named Vahan I Mamikonian including two other brothers named Vasak and Artaxias. During his youth, he was a hostage in Persia, but was later released. In 505/510, he succeeded his elder brother Vahan I Mamikonian as Marzban of Persian Armenia. According to Sebeos and Stepanos Asoghik, Vard carried the Byzantine title of patrikios, however, neither the contemporary historian Ghazar Parpetsi nor other historians mentioned that he carried the title, making it probably a misinterpretation of two historians. Vard was removed from his office four years later and was deported to Persia by order of the Sasanian king Kavadh I, where he died after a short time.

Vard's removal from the Marzban office, put an end to the short-lived Armenian autonomy which lasted c. 25 years. King Kavadh I, however, maintained religious freedom in Armenia because of fear of rebellion, and in order to maintain good relations with the Byzantine Empire.

== Sources ==
- Basmadjian, Krikor Jacob (1914). "Chronologie de l'histoire d'Arménie". Revue de l'Orient chrétien (in French). IX (XIX): 293–294.
- Grousset, René (1947). Histoire de l'Arménie des origines à 1071 (in French). Paris: Payot.
- Toumanoff, Cyrille (1990). "Vice-rois iraniens (Marzpans) d'Arménie". Les dynasties de la Caucasie chrétienne de l'Antiquité jusqu'au xixe siècle : Tables généalogiques et chronologiques (in French). Rome. pp. 506–507.
- Settipani, Christian (2006). Continuité des élites à Byzance durant les siècles obscurs. Les princes caucasiens et l'Empire du vie au ixe siècle (in French). Paris: de Boccard. ISBN 978-2-7018-0226-8.
- Dédéyan, Gérard (2007). Histoire du peuple arménien (in French). Toulouse: Éd. Privat. ISBN 978-2-7089-6874-5.

Preceded by Vahan I Mamikonian	Marzban of Persian Armenia; 505/510–509/514	Succeeded by Several Persian Marzbans
