= Sahak II =

Sahak II may refer to:

- Sahak II Bagratuni, marzban of Persian Armenia in 481–482
- Sahak II of Cilicia, Catholicos of the Holy See of Cilicia in 1902–1939
