= Ghazar Parpetsi =

Early medieval Armenian historian

- Ղազար Փարպեցի
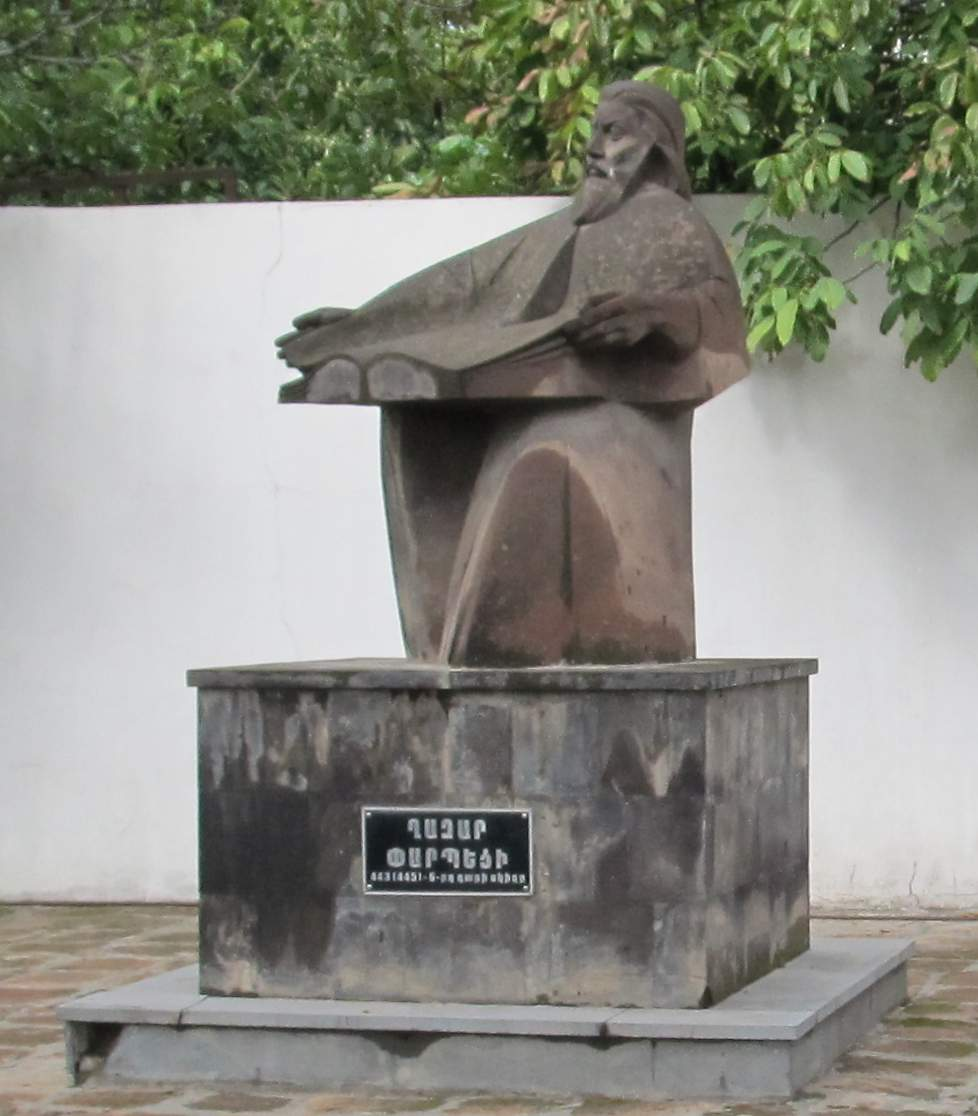
- Monument to Ghazar Parpetsi in Parpi
- Born: c. 441-443 or 453; Parpi (a village near Ashtarak, Sasanian Armenia)
- Died: Early sixth century Parpi^{1}
- Occupations: Historian, clergyman
- Known for: History of the Armenians, Letter to Vahan Mamikonian

Notes
- ^{1}It also has been suggested that he was buried at the Holy Apostles Monastery in Mush.

Ghazar Parpetsi (Armenian: Ղազար Փարպեցի; Łazar Pʻarpecʻi) was a fifth-to-sixth-century Armenian historian. He had close ties with the powerful Mamikonian noble family and is most prominent for writing a history of Armenia in the last years of the fifth century or at the beginning of the sixth century. The history covers events from 387 to 485, starting with the partition of Armenia between the Byzantine and Sasanian empires and ending with the appointment of Vahan Mamikonian (Ghazar's friend and patron) as marzpan (governor) of Sasanian-ruled Armenia. It is the main source for Armenian history in the fifth century and is one of the two main accounts, along with that of Elishe, of the Armenian rebellion of 449–451 led by Vardan Mamikonian.

== Life ==
Ghazar (Note: Łazar (Ghazar reflects the later pronunciation) is the Armenian equivalent of Lazarus.) is possibly the first Armenian historian whose identity and time of writing are not the subject of dispute. (Note: If Koryun, who wrote a biography of his teacher Mashtots, is not counted.) He was born in the village of Parpi (near the town of Ashtarak in Armenia, then under Sasanian rule) around 441–43 or 453, and was raised by a princess of the Mamikonian family. His family was part of the lower or middle nobility. They may have been relatives of the Mamikonians or were otherwise closely connected to them. Following the defeat of the Armenians at the Battle of Avarayr in 451, Ghazar moved with the Mamikonians to the bdeashkh Arshusha's castle Tsurtav in Gugark (in modern-day Georgia), where he received his primary education. Studying under the auspices of Aghan (Ałan) Artsruni, he befriended the latter's nephew, Vahan Mamikonian. He excelled in his studies and went to Byzantine territory—possibly Constantinople—and continued his studies there from about 465 to 470, learning new languages and studying religion, literature, and Classical philosophy.

Returning to Armenia, Ghazar busied himself with educational and spiritual activities in the district of Shirak, then part of the domains of the Kamsarakan family. From 484 to 486, he lived in Syunik until Vahan Mamikonian, who had recently been appointed the marzpan (governor) of Armenia by the Sasanians, invited him to oversee the reconstruction of a monastery being built in Vagharshapat. However, Ghazar soon came into conflict with other Armenian clergymen. Accused of heresy and receiving no help from the head of the Armenian clergy, Catholicos Babgen, he left for the city of Amida in Byzantine territory in about 490. According to Stepan Melik-Bakhshian, Ghazar's educational activities provoked the ire of the "regressive clergy." In Robert W. Thomson's view, it is very unlikely that Ghazar was actually a heretic; rather, it was probably his strongly pro-Greek views, his antipathy towards Syrians and those unfamiliar with Greek learning, and his "obviously prickly attitude" that made him an unpopular figure and positioned him against the mainstream of Armenian church politics at the time, which was moving towards a break with Chalcedonian Christianity. It was in Amida that Ghazar wrote his Letter to Vahan Mamikonian, which includes biographical information about the author. Ghazar was eventually recalled by Vahan (probably around 493) and commissioned to write a history of Armenia. According to Armenian tradition, Ghazar was buried near the ruins of an Armenian church in Parpi Canyon, south of a village named Lazrevan (Ghazaravan) in Armenia, although another tradition purports that he was buried the Arakelots Monastery near Muş.

== Works ==
Ghazar's known works are his History of Armenia and his Letter to Vahan Mamikonian, appended to the history. The letter was written during Ghazar's time in Amida. It is a defense against the accusations of heresy and other accusations leveled against him by "slanderous monks." The letter contains a brief introduction, which in Grigor Khalatiants's view was written by one of Ghazar's students. The earliest surviving manuscript of the whole text was dated 1672 (Matenadaran No. 2639). Some fragments survive from the 15th century, and there is one fragment predating the year 1200 which has a form of the text quite divergent from that known later. Ghazar's History of Armenia was edited at some time around or after 1200, and we cannot be sure to what extent even more radical "editing" was undertaken by well-meaning scholars; it is possible that deliberate and tendentious changes were introduced.

Ghazar wrote his history in the last few years of the fifth century or at the beginning of the sixth century at the request of Vahan Mamikonian. After summarizing the contents of the previous histories attributed to Agathangelos and Faustus of Byzantium, Ghazar begins his own history with the partition of Armenia between the Byzantine and Sasanian empires in 387, the year that Faustus's history ends. Ghazar's History is composed of three parts. The first is about political events in Armenia from the partition of 387, including the efforts of the Sasanians to solidify their rule over Armenia, the invention of the Armenian alphabet by Mesrop Mashtots, the deposition of the last Armenian Arsacid king Artaxias IV in 428, and ending with the deaths of Catholicos Isaac and Mashtots in 438 and 439, respectively. The first part includes a prophetic vision attributed to Catholicos Isaac predicting the restoration of the Arsacid and Gregorid lines in Armenia, although this is judged to be a later interpolation into the text. (Note: Gohar Muradyan considers it possible that Ghazar himself wrote it, perhaps drawing from an existing source.) The second part concerns the events leading up to the Armenian rebellion led by Vardan Mamikonian (uncle of Vahan) against the Sasanians, the Battle of Avarayr, as well as its consequences. The third part is based on the author's own memories and focuses on the successful rebellion led by Vahan Mamikonian in 482–484, the consequent signing of the Nvarsak Treaty in 484, and Vahan's appointment as marzpan of Armenia.

The main sources he uses in History are the primary works of previous Armenian historians, Agathangelos, Koryun, and Faustus, although he apparently made use of other historians' works, including Eusebius of Caesarea's Historia Ecclesiastica. He also relied on living informants who participated in the events described. According to Gohar Muradyan, Ghazar appears to have read the history of Elishe (although he never mentions or alludes to it), which purports to be a firsthand account of Vardan's rebellion, but there are no textual parallels between the two works. In Muradyan's view, the closeness between the two works is likely because the authors were near-contemporaries and lived during the events about which they wrote. Thomson, on the other hand, notes, "[t]hat the two versions of the rebellion are related is clear from exact verbal correspondence at many points" and lists several reasons to believe that Elishe's work dates to later than the fifth century.

Within the Armenian historical tradition, Ghazar's history does not appear to have had an immediate impact. Knowledge of his history was fairly rare before 1000. It was used without acknowledgment by Movses Khorenatsi (Note: Per Thomson, who favors a later date for Khorenatsi, who claimed to be an author of the fifth century. See Nersessian 1998 for an alternative view, according to which Khorenatsi is the "philosopher Movses" mentioned in Parpetsi's history.) and Tovma Artsruni (tenth century). References to Ghazar become more frequent after Stepanos Asoghik (tenth–eleventh centuries). His work is the main source for Armenian history in the fifth century. It also contains important information about fifth-century Iranian history and geography and the military hierarchy, administration and politics of the Sasanian Empire, as well as about Georgia, Caucasian Albania, and the nomadic empires to the north. According to Robert Bedrosian, he is a "reasonably trustworthy historian," although his biases, especially religious ones, sometimes cause him to misidentify the causes of some events. As a Christian and a supporter of the Mamikonians, he is extremely hostile towards Sasanian Iran and the Armenian nobles who sided with Iran against the Mamikonian-led rebels. However, he accepted Armenia's place as a province of the Sasanian Empire, seeing as evil Yazdegerd II's attempts to force the Iranian religion and political control upon Armenia. Critics have valued the organization of Ghazar's history and his approach to historical writing. He has been dubbed "the rhetor" in the Armenian tradition and praised for his "language and integrity" and sometimes compared to Thucydides for his "clarity and historical sense," in contrast with Movses Khorenatsi, who is sometimes called the "Armenian Herodotus." Dickran Kouymjian notes that his reliability is also strengthened by his personal closeness to several important figures involved in the events he described, although it also formed his strong biases in favor of the Mamikonians and their relatives.

== Translations ==
=== English translations ===
- Ghazar P'arpec'i's History of the Armenians, translated into English by Robert Bedrosian (translated 1980, published 1985) from the 1904 Classical Armenian edition (Letter to Vahan Mamikonian not included).
- The History of Łazar Pʻarpecʻi, translated into English by Robert W. Thomson (Atlanta: Scholars Press, 1991), including both the history and the Letter to Vahan Mamikonian.

=== French translations ===
- In V. Langlois, Collection des historiens anciens et modernes de l'Arménie, vol. 2 (Paris: Librairie de Firmin Didot Frères, Fils et Cie, 1869).

== Sources ==
- Ghazar P'arpec'i (1985) [Translated in 1980]. Ghazar P'arpec'i's History of the Armenians. Sources of the Armenian Tradition. Translated by Bedrosian, Robert. New York. (Online text.)
- Hacikyan, Agop Jack; Basmajian, Gabriel; Franchuk, Edward S.; Ouzounian, Nourhan (2000). The Heritage of Armenian Literature, Volume I: From the Oral Tradition to the Golden Age. Detroit: Wayne State University Press. pp. 213–237. ISBN 0-8143-2815-6.
- Kouymjian, Dickran (1994). "Lazar Parpetsi". In Greppin, John A. C. (ed.). Studies in Classical Armenian Literature. Delmar, New York: Caravan Books. pp. 152–192.
- Łazar Pʻarpecʻi (1991). The History of Łazar Pʻarpecʻi. Translated by Thomson, Robert W. Atlanta: Scholars Press. ISBN 1-55540-579-7.
- Melik-Bakhshian, S. (1981). "Ghazar Pʻarpetsʻi" Ղազար Փարպեցի. Haykakan sovetakan hanragitaran Հայկական սովետական հանրագիտարան [Armenian Soviet Encyclopedia] (in Armenian). Vol. 7. Erevan: Haykakan hanragitarani glkhavor khmbagrutʻyun. pp. 19–20.
- Melik-Bakhshian, St. T. (1996) [Orig. published 1979]. Hayotsʻ patmutʻyan aghbyuragitutʻyun Հայոց պատմության աղբյուրագիտություն [Source study for Armenian history] (3rd ed.). Erevani hamalsarani hratarakchʻutʻyun. pp. 78–88.
- Muradyan, Gohar (2018). "Łazar Pʿarpecʿi". In Yarshater, Ehsan (ed.). Encyclopædia Iranica (Online ed.). Encyclopædia Iranica Foundation.
- Muradyan, Gohar (2014). "The Vision of St. Sahak in the History of Łazar P'arpec'i". In Bardakjian, Kevork B.; La Porta, Sergio (eds.). The Armenian Apocalyptic Tradition: A Comparative Perspective. Leiden: Brill. pp. 313–325. ISBN 978-90-04-27026-8.
- Nersessian, Vrej Nerses (1998). "Movsés Khorenatsi and Ghazar Pʻarpetsi" (PDF). Haigazian Armenological Review. 18: 195–205.
