= Sahak II Bagratuni =

- Marzban of Armenia
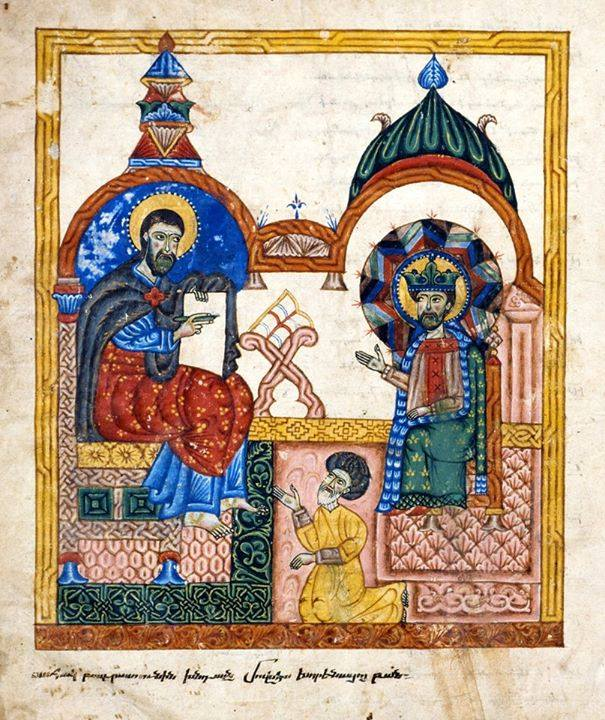
- Movses Khorentsi and Sahak Bagratuni
- Reign: 481-482
- Predecessor: Adhur Hormizd
- Successor: Shapur Mihran

Prince of Sper

Tagadir Aspet (Coronant Knight )
- Died: 482; Charmana
- Issue: Sanpdiat Bagratuni
- Dynasty: Bagratuni dynasty
- Father: Tirots Bagratuni
- Religion: Armenian Apostolic Church

Sahak Aspet Bagratuni (Armenian: Սահակ Ասպետ Բագրատունի), was an Armenian nobleman from the Bagratuni dynasty. Sahak II was the son of Tirots I Bagratuni an Armenian aspet. When Tirots died in 451, Sahak II was given the aspet title.Sahak had a son named Spandiat, who was given the title of aspet after his death.

== Vahanantz Rebellion ==
In 481, the Vahanantz Rebellion broke out as a result of the Armenian nakharar movement against Sasanian Persia. The prerequisites for the rebellion had taken shape as early as the 460s, when the Sasanian court adopted a policy toward Armenia aimed at strengthening central authority and restricting the autonomy of the Armenian princely houses. The Sasanian authorities also sought to divide the Armenian nobility and weaken its potential for unified resistance. Under these conditions, a section of the Armenian spiritual and secular elite began to oppose the Persian regime. Led by Catholicos Gyut (461–478), these forces—according to modern studies on Ghazar Parpetsi's history—were also seeking ties with Byzantium in order to secure external support in the future.

The political situation in Armenia deteriorated during the reign of Peroz I. Vahan Mamikonian was summoned to the Persian court, but he managed to regain the king's trust and was granted the right to collect taxes in Armenia.In 481, the outbreak of an anti-Persian rebellion in Eastern Georgia contributed to the start of the uprising in Armenia as well. Defying the order of the Marzban of Armenia, Atrvshnasp, to leave for Georgia, the Armenian troops joined Vahan Mamikonian. Under Vahan's leadership, they attacked Dvin, defeated the Persian forces stationed there, and brought the city under their control. In the government established by the rebels, Vahan Mamikonian assumed the position of Sparapet (Commander-in-Chief), while Sahak Bagratuni took on the role of Marzban (Governor). Thus, Sahak was not only a military leader, but also one of the highest-ranking officials of the Armenian authority formed during the rebellion.

Following the initial defeat of the Persian garrison and the overthrow of Marzban Atrvshnasp in 481, Armenian forces restored control over a number of settlements. Sahak Bagratuni was elected Marzban and Tanuter of Armenia, assuming responsibility for the country's political governance.

During the winter of 481–482, Vahan Mamikonian continued military operations against Persian forces while simultaneously attempting to broaden the participation in the rebellion. The Armenian side succeeded in rallying a larger number of nakharars and military forces around its cause, as well as strengthening ties with the Georgian rebels.During this period, Sahak Bagratuni's position as Marzban played a crucial role in the political administration of the territory controlled by the rebels and in the organization of military operations.

Ghazar Parpetsi writes that during the 482 liberation war led by Vahan Mamikonian in Armenia, "Sahak the Aspet" was appointed head of the government formed by the rebels, with the authority of Marzban. Vahan led the Armenian army into the battlefield with "the wonderful Aspet Sahak the Marzban," and entrusted the central column to "the good man Sahak, the Aspet Marzban." "The blessed Aspet Sahak" was also among the Armenian troops dispatched to Georgia to support the Georgian rebels. Among those who fell in battle, the historian also commemorates "the holy Aspet Sahak."

Having expelled the Persian forces from Armenia and cast off Sasanian rule, he established a government based in the city of Dvin. The Armenian government formed in Dvin managed the country's administration and organized further military operations against the Persian forces. At this stage, the Armenian princely houses acted jointly in an attempt to restore Armenia's political autonomy.

The Persian court, however, did not abandon its efforts to suppress the rebellion. Subsequent military operations led to the Battles of Nersehapat and Charmana in 482, during which Sahak Bagratuni served as one of the key commanders of the Armenian army. The military phase of the uprising continued even after the Battle of Charmana. Following the defeat of the joint Armenian-Georgian forces, the struggle carried on through smaller military units. The situation changed after Peroz I was killed in battle against the Hephthalites. His successor, Balash (Vagharsh, 484–488), entered into negotiations with Vahan Mamikonian, resulting in the Treaty of Nvarsak. Under the treaty, the Armenians were granted religious freedom and a measure of internal autonomy, while Vahan Mamikonian was appointed Marzban of Armenia.

== Military operations and death ==
Battle of Nersehapat

In the spring of 482, Persian forces invaded the Artaz province with the goal of suppressing the rebellion. In the victorious battle against the Persian invaders near the village of Nersehapat, Sahak Bagratuni led the Armenian heavy cavalry and commanded the center wing of the Armenian army, which was under the supreme command of Vahan Mamikonian. In the Battle of Nersehapat, Sahak Bagratuni demonstrated exceptional bravery by engaging in single combat with the Persian general Atrnerseh and killing him.

=== Battle of Charmana and Death ===
Following the victory at Nersehapat, the Persian side attempted to suppress the rebellion with fresh forces. In the summer of 482, the Battle of Charmana took place. At the beginning of the battle, Sahak Bagratuni, alongside Babken Syuni, commanded the reserve forces positioned in the third line. When the Armenian central regiment found itself surrounded, the reserve unit led by Sahak Bagratuni delivered a powerful blow to the enemy and helped break the encirclement; however, the Marzban of Armenia fell heroically in this decisive engagement.

In his History of the Armenians, Ghazar Parpetsi speaks with great enthusiasm about Sahak Bagratuni, the patron of Khorenatsi: "Then the commander of the Armenians, Vahan Mamikonian, began to arrange each flank of the battle array accordingly. He placed the central flank with many cavalry into the hands of the good man Sahak, the Aspet Marzban, and on the right wing he assigned Baghl Vahnuni..." He also writes: "...and in the central section he positioned himself alongside three honorable men—the blessed Arshavir, the blessed Lord of Gnunik, placing the blessed Aspet Sahak and Babgen of Syunik between himself and Barshl."

The death of Sahak Bagratuni in the Battle of Charmana was a severe blow to the military leadership of the rebels. Nevertheless, the rebellion did not end; under the leadership of Vahan Mamikonian, the struggle continued until the Nvarsak negotiations and the signing of the treaty.

Following his death, sole leadership of the rebellion was assumed by Vahan Mamikonian, under whose command the Armenian nakharars continued the struggle against Sasanian rule.

== Sahak Bagratuni as a patron of the work of Movses Khorenatsi ==
Sahak Bagratuni is famous as the patron and commissioner of the History of Armenia by the Father of History, Movses Khorenatsi. Khorenatsi wrote his monumental work, History of Armenia, at the explicit request of Sahak Bagratuni, speaking of him with immense praise and admiration.

In his address to Sahak Bagratuni, Khorenatsi highly values his intellectual capabilities and his passion for history. He writes: "The boundless operation of divine gifts within you, and the unceasing motions of your soul upon your intellect, I recognized through this noble request, becoming acquainted with your soul even before your body. This is both pleasing to my taste and agreeable, especially to my habits. Therefore, one ought not only to praise you, but also to pray for you, that you may always remain so."

"For if we are in the image of God by virtue of reason, as it is said, and on the other hand, the product of reason is wisdom, and the desire for these is unyielding within you—then by keeping the spark of your wisdom bright and ablaze with beautiful thought, you adorn reason, thereby remaining an image. It may be said that through this you bring joy to its Originator, pursuing these inquiries with a beautiful and measured zeal."

Khorenatsi then notes that the chieftains and princes of the Armenian land who lived before him and in his own time did not undertake the task of compiling such historical records. In this context, he singles out Sahak Bagratuni, writing: "Along with this, I also observe the following: if the chieftains and princes of the Armenian land who lived before us and in our time neither ordered the wise men at their disposal and available to them to write such historical records, nor thought to bring in contributions of wisdom from anywhere else, and now we see you as such a person—then it is clear that you ought to be recognized as grander than all who came before you, worthy of the highest praise, and deserving of being inscribed in such a historical record."

Accepting Sahak Bagratuni's request, Khorenatsi then states that he is ready to compose the history, leaving it as a legacy for Sahak and future generations: "Therefore, accepting your request with joy, I will gladly work to fulfill it, leaving this as an immortal memory for you and the generations that succeed you. For you are an ancient and brave nation, fruitful not only in speech and useful wisdom, but also through many great and glorious deeds, which we shall mention throughout this history, when, by constructing the genealogy from father to son, we write the lineage of all the princely houses of Armenia, telling briefly and reliably whence and how each arose, as is found in certain Greek histories."

In his work, the author presents himself as a disciple of Saint Mesrop and notes that he compiled the work at the request of Isahak (Sahak) Bagratuni—the Bagratuni prince who fell in battle in 482.

== Literature ==
• Ghazar Parpetsi. History of Armenia.

• Armenian Soviet Encyclopedia. Volume 10. Page 135.

• Nina G. Garsoïan. The Marzpanate. 1997.

• Vahan M. Kurkjian. A History of Armenia. Section on the Vahan War.

Preceded by Adhur Gushnasp	Marzban of Persian Armenia; 482	Succeeded by Shapur Mihran
