= Tan-Shapur =

Marzban of Persian Armenia
- In office 552/554–560
- Monarch: Khosrau I
- Preceded by: Gushnasp Bahram
- Succeeded by: Varazdat

Personal details
- Born: Unknown
- Died: Unknown

Tan-Shapur was a Sasanian nobleman who served as Marzban of Persian Armenia from 552/554 to 560.

== Biography ==
Little is known about Tan-Shapur. René Grousset said he governed Persian Armenia from 554 to 560. Cyril Toumanoff, however, says that Tan-Shapur's governorship of Persian Armenia lasted from 552 to 560. Stepanos Asoghik, an Armenian historian who lived in the 11th century, said that Tan-Shapur went proselytizing Zoroastrianism in Persian Armenia, where many Christians preferred to die instead of converting. However, it was during his governorship that the Armenian Apostolic Church organized the Second Council of Dvin. In 560, Tan-Shapur was replaced by Varazdat as Marzban of Persian Armenia.

== Sources ==
- Basmadjian, Krikor Jacob (1914). "Chronologie de l'histoire d'Arménie". Revue de l'Orient chrétien (in French). IX (XIX): 293–294.
- Grousset, René (1947). Histoire de l'Arménie des origines à 1071 (in French). Paris: Payot.
- Toumanoff, Cyrille (1990). "Vice-rois iraniens (Marzpans) d'Arménie". Les dynasties de la Caucasie chrétienne de l'Antiquité jusqu'au xixe siècle : Tables généalogiques et chronologiques (in French). Rome. pp. 506–507.
- Settipani, Christian (2006). Continuité des élites à Byzance durant les siècles obscurs. Les princes caucasiens et l'Empire du vie au ixe siècle (in French). Paris: de Boccard. ISBN 978-2-7018-0226-8.
- Dédéyan, Gérard (2007). Histoire du peuple arménien (in French). Toulouse: Éd. Privat. ISBN 978-2-7089-6874-5.
