= Artaxias IV =

King of Armenia from 422 to 428

Artaxias IV Արտաշես Դ
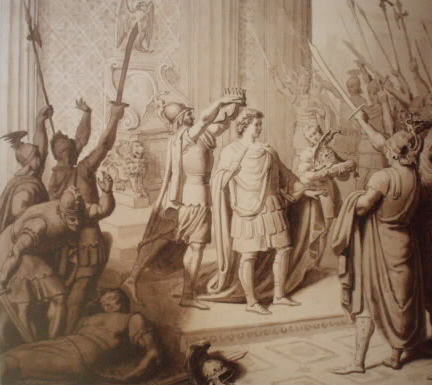
- Artaxias IV crowned in 423 by Smbat III Bagratuni (19th century image)

King of Armenia
- Reign: 422–428
- Predecessor: Shapur IV
- Successor: position abolished (Veh Mihr Shapur as marzban)
- Born: 404
- Died: 430
- House: Arsacid
- Father: Vramshapuh
- Mother: Varazdukht

Artaxias IV or Artashir IV (Note: Also known as Artaxias, Artashes, Artashes IV, Artashir, Ardasir and Artases) (Armenian: Արտաշես Դ, romanized: Artashes D) was a prince who served as a Sasanid client king of eastern Armenia from 422 until 428. Artaxias IV was the last Arsacid king of Armenia and the last person to hold the crown of the ancient Armenian Kingdom.

== Biography ==
=== Family background ===
Artaxias IV was the son of Vramshapuh who ruled eastern Armenia as a Sasanid vassal from 389 until 417. Artaxias' uncle, Khosrov IV, ruled Armenia before Vramshapuh (and possibly after as well). Modern genealogies depict Artaxias IV as the grandson of Varasdates (Varazdat). Artaxias IV was born about 405, as he was seventeen years old when enthroned. The identity of his mother is unknown. She may have been Vramshapuh's wife or concubine. Artaxias IV was born and raised in Armenia and little is known about his life, prior to his kingship. Artaxias IV was named in honor of past kings of Armenia and Iberia who had this name.

=== Rise to the throne ===
When Vramshapuh died in 417, Artaxias IV was too young to succeed his father as king. After his father died, the Armenian Catholicos Sahak, who was Artaxias IV's distant relative, visited the court of the Sasanid king, Yazdegerd I, to obtain the release of Khosrov IV from political exile. Yazdegerd consented and released Khosrov from imprisonment. Upon release, Khosrov may have served again as king of Armenia from 417 until 418, when he died. Little is known about Artaxias IV's relationship with his father and uncle.

Until 422, Armenia was under direct rule of the local Armenian nakharar nobility and the Sasanid dynasty. The nakharar requested that the Sasanid dynasty enthrone a client king from the Arsacid line. In 422, Artaxias IV was enthroned as king of Armenia.

=== Kingship ===
Upon his elevation to the throne, Artaxias IV called himself Artashir in deference to past Sasanid kings. Following his uncle and father, Artaxias IV served as the third Sasanid vassal of eastern Armenia, ruling as a Christian monarch subservient to a Zoroastrian state.

As king, Artaxias IV had the support of the reigning Catholicos, Sahak. Although Artaxias IV was recognised by the nakharars as their king, the centrifugal tendencies of the nobles were beyond his control. The leading members of the nobility soon resumed their intrigues under pretense of disgust at the young king's vices. Due to his youth and weakness in character, Artaxias IV was unable to cope with the Armenian aristocracy. Sahak appealed at various times to the nakharars to respect the king's supreme authority, to cooperate with him and be his ally, but these appeals were disregarded.

The nakharars lost confidence in the Armenian monarchy and determined that direct rule by Persia would be preferred over vassalage. At the nakharars' request, Artaxias IV was dethroned by Bahram V in 428. Armenia was annexed and became a satrapy of the Persian Empire. The Sasanids installed Veh Mihr Shapur as marzban of Persian Armenia. The further fate of Artaxias IV is unknown. Through the dethronement of Artaxias IV, Armenian rule by the Arsacid dynasty and almost a thousand years of Armenian monarchy ended.

== Sources ==
- Adalian, R. P. (2010). Historical Dictionary of Armenia. Scarecrow Press.
- Faustus of Byzantium, History of the Armenians, 5th century
- Hovannisian, R. G. (2004). The Armenian People From Ancient to Modern Times, Volume I: The Dynastic Periods: From Antiquity to the Fourteenth Century. Palgrave Macmillan.
- Kurkjian, V. M. (2008). A History of Armenia. Indo-European Publishing.
- Ghazar Parpetsi, History of Armenia, 5th to 6th century
- N. Ouzounian, The Heritage of Armenian Literature: From the Oral Tradition to the Golden Age, Wayne State University Press, 2000
- Toumanoff, Cyril (1976). Manuel de Généalogie et de Chronologie pour l'Histoire de la Caucasie Chrétienne (Arménie-Géorgie-Albanie) (in French). Rome: Edizioni Aquila. OCLC 4780662.
- Yarshater, E. (1983). The Cambridge History of Iran. Cambridge: Cambridge University Press.
