= Claire Mouradian =

French historian of Armenian origin (born 1951)

Claire Mouradian (Armenian: Կլեր Մուրատեան, born in 1951) is a French historian of Armenian origin who specializes in the history and geopolitics of Caucasus and, more specifically, in the history of Armenia and Armenian diaspora. She explores in her works inter-ethnic relations in the Caucasus region, migration and the position of minorities.

Claire Mouradian is director of research at the CNRS and teaches at the EHESS. She successfully defended a history thesis on Soviet Armenia from the death of Stalin until 1982; from 1981, she teaches Armenian civilization at the INALCO.

== Bibliography (selection) ==
=== Books ===
- Caucase, terres d'empire, éd. Armand Colin, Paris, 2005.
- Les Massacres des Arméniens. Le meurtre d'une nation (1915-16), éd. Payot, Paris, 2005, ISBN 2228898724 (directrice de la réédition critique du texte by Arnold Joseph Toynbee).
- L'Arménie, Presses universitaires de France, Paris, 2002 (coll. Que sais-je? n° 851, 3rs edition), ISBN 213047327X (réécriture de l'ouvrage homonyme paru en 1959 sous la plume de Jean-Pierre Alem).
- De Staline à Gorbatchev : histoire d'une république soviétique, l'Arménie, éd. Ramsay, 1990 ISBN 2859568379.

=== In collaboration ===
- Loin de l'Ararat... : Les petites Arménies d'Europe et de Méditerranée, Les Arméniens de Marseille, éd. Hazan, 2007, ISBN 978-2754102230 (participation; other authors : Florence Pizzorni-Itié and Myriame Morel-Deledalle).
- Arménie, une passion française : Le mouvement arménophile en France 1878-1923, éd. Magellan et Cie, 2007, ISBN 978-2350740720 (participation; collective work).
- 1915 : j'avais six ans en Arménie, éd. L'Inventaire, Paris, 2007, ISBN 9782910490935 (participation; principal author: Virginie-Jija Mesropian).
- Le Génocide des Arméniens (100 réponses sur), éd. Tournon, 2005, ISBN 2914237413 (with Anne Dastakian).
- Le Livre noir du colonialisme, XVIe-XXIe siècle, de l’extermination à la repentance, éd. Robert Laffont, Paris, 2003 (contribution: chapter "Les Russes au Caucase", collective work under the dir. of Marc Ferro).
- Ailleurs, hier, autrement : Connaissance et reconnaissance du génocide des Arméniens, special issue of the Revue d’histoire de la Shoah, n° 177–178, January–August 2003, coordination in collaboration with Georges Bensoussan and Yves Ternon, ISBN 978-2850566400.
- Histoire des Arméniens, éd. Privat, Toulouse, 3rd edition, 2003, (chapter: L'Arménie soviétique, 1920–1980, in collaboration avec Marc Ferro; ouvrage collectif sous la direction de Gérard Dedeyan).
- Les Massacres de Diarbékir. Correspondance diplomatique du vice-consul de France, 1894-1896, éd. L'Inventaire, Paris, 2000 (présentation and annotation; author : M. Durand-Meyrier).
- Arménie : 3000 ans d'histoire, MJCA, Marseille-Venise, 1988 (collective work, other authors : Raymond Haroutioun Kévorkian and Jean-Pierre Mahé).
