= Sasanian Armenia =

Parts of Armenia under the control of the Sasanian Empire

Sasanian Armenia Հայկական մարզպանություն
- 252 – 299^{a} 363 – 428^{b} 428–646^{c}
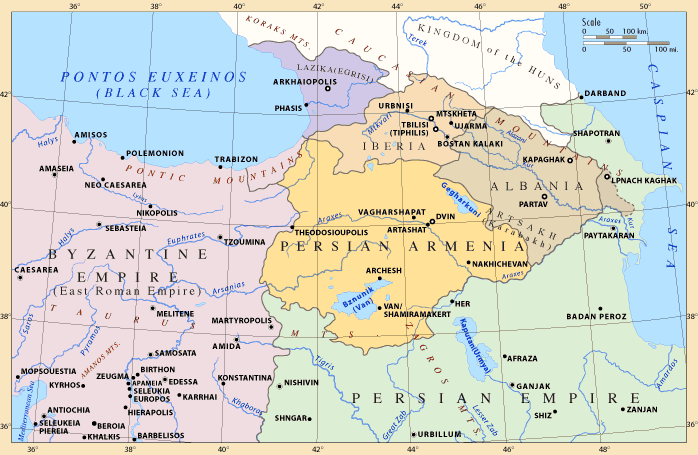
- Sasanian Armenia ca. 387–591
- Status: Province of the Sasanian Empire
- Capital: Dvin
- Common languages: Armenian (native language); Parthian; Middle Persian (royal administration and court); Greek and Syriac (religious)
- Religion: Armenian Apostolic Church; Zoroastrianism
- Government: Monarchy
- Historical era: Late Antiquity
  - Established: 252/3
  - Romano-Armenian conquest: 299
  - Partition of Armenia: 387
  - Marzbanate period starts: 428
  - Rashidun conquest: 646
Preceded by	Succeeded by
Kingdom of Armenia (antiquity)	Arminiya
- 1. Shapur I conquers Kingdom of Armenia, later lost to the Romans after the Treaty of Nisibis.; 2. The Romans cede Armenia to Shapur II in 363.; 3. The Kingdom of Armenia is once and for all abolished by Bahram V, who appoints Veh Mihr Shapur as marzban of the country, thus starting the "Marzbanate period".

Sasanian Armenia, also known as Persian Armenia, Persarmenia and Armenian marzpanate (Armenian: Հայկական մարզպանություն – Haykakan marzpanutyun), may either refer to the periods in which Armenia (Middle Persian: 𐭠𐭫𐭬𐭭𐭩 – Armin) was under the suzerainty of the Sasanian Empire or specifically to the parts of Armenia under its control such as after the partition of 387, when parts of western Armenia were incorporated into the Eastern Roman Empire while the rest of Armenia came under Sasanian suzerainty but maintained its existing kingdom until 428.

In 428, Armenian nobles petitioned Bahram V to depose Artaxias IV (r. 422); Bahram V (r. 420–438) abolished the Kingdom of Armenia and appointed Veh Mihr Shapur as marzban (governor of a frontier province, "margrave") of the country, which marked the start of a new era known as the Marzpanate period (Armenian: Մարզպանական Հայաստան – Marzpanakan Hayastan), a period when marzbans, nominated by the Sasanian emperor, governed eastern Armenia, as opposed to the western Byzantine Armenia which was ruled by several princes, and later governors, under Byzantine suzerainty. The Marzpanate period ended with the Arab conquest of Armenia in the 7th century, when the Principality of Armenia was established. An estimated 3,000,000 Armenians were under the influence of the Sasanian marzpans during this period.

The marzban was invested with supreme power, even imposing death sentences; but he could not interfere with the age-long privileges of the Armenian nakharars. The country as a whole enjoyed considerable autonomy. The office of Hazarapet, corresponding to that of Minister of the Interior, public works and finance, was mostly entrusted to an Armenian, while the post of Sparapet (commander-in-chief) was entrusted only to an Armenian. Each nakharar had his own army, according to the extent of his domain. The "National Cavalry", or "Royal Force", was under the commander-in-chief. The tax collectors were all Armenians. The courts of justice and the schools were directed by the Armenian clergy. Several times, an Armenian nakharar became marzpan, as did Vahan Mamikonian in 485 after a period of rebellion against the Iranians.

Three times during the Marzpanic period, Iranian kings launched persecutions against Christianity in Armenia. The Iranians had tolerated the invention of the Armenian alphabet and the founding of schools, which they thought would encourage the spiritual separation of Armenia from the Byzantines, but on the contrary, the new cultural movement among the Armenians proved to be conducive to closer relations with Byzantium.

== Background ==
Christianity became the state religion of Armenia in 301. In 387, Armenia was divided between the Sasanian Empire and the Eastern Roman Empire. The former established control in Eastern Armenia after the fall of the Arshakuni Armenian Kingdom in 428.

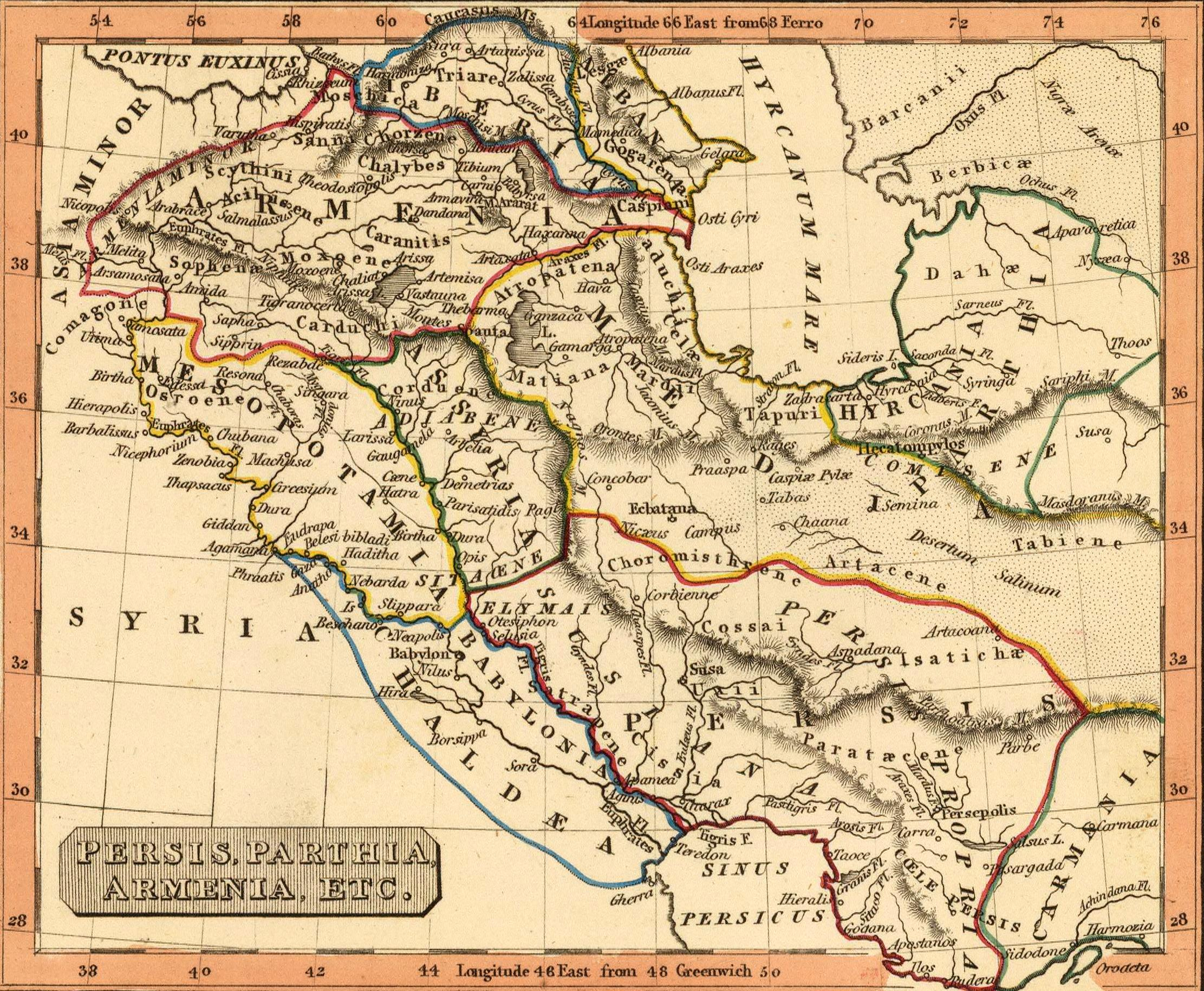
Persis, Parthia, Armenia. Rest Fenner, published in 1835

== History ==
=== Marzbanate (428–646) ===
In 428, Armenian nobles, nakharar, dissatisfied with the rule of Artaxias IV petitioned emperor Bahram V to depose him. Bahram V abolished the Kingdom of Armenia and appointed Veh Mihr Shapur as marzban (governor of a frontier province, "margrave") of the country.

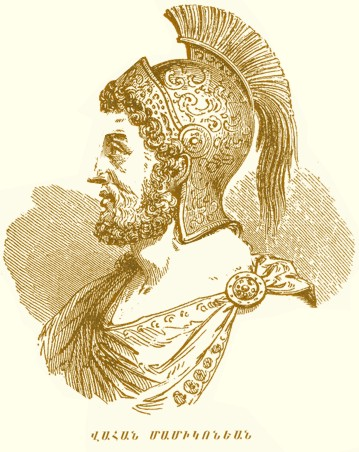
Illustration of Vahan Mamikonian.

In 465, Adhur Gushnasp was appointed by the Sasanian emperor Peroz I (r. 459–484) as the marzban of Armenia, replacing Adhur Hormizd. In 475, the Mamikonian princess Shushanik, was murdered by her husband Prince Varsken, a recent convert to Zoroastrianism, because she refused to convert and wanted to stay Christian. Varsken was then executed by Vakhtang I, king of Iberia.

Peroz I, eager to avenge Varsken, sent his general Shapur Mihran to Iberia. Vakhtang then appealed to the Huns and the Armenian nobles, citing solidarity between Christians. After carefully weighing the decision, the Mamikonian prince Vahan Mamikonian agreed to revolt against the Sasanians. He defeated and killed Adhur Gushnasp, and thereafter declared Sahak II Bagratuni as the new marzban. He also kept repelling several Sasanian counter-attacks.

In 482, Shapur Mihran began to become a big threat to the security of Iberia, which made Vakhtang request Armenian aid. Vahan and Sahak shortly arrived to Iberia at the head of a big army, but were defeated in Akesga, where Sahak was killed. Vahan fled with the remnants of the Armenian army into the mountains, where he led guerrilla actions against the Sasanians, while Shapur Mihran managed to regain control of Armenia. However, Shapur Mihran was shortly ordered to return to the Sasanian capital of Ctesiphon. Vahan quickly used the opportunity to regain control of Armenia.

In the spring of 484, however, Shapur Mihran returned as the head of a new army and forced Vahan to flee to refuge near the Byzantine frontier, at Tao and Taron. During the same period, the Sasanian noble Zarmihr Karen from the Karenid family, was successful in another campaign against the Armenians, and managed to capture several of them, including noblemen from the Kamsarakan family. Zarmihr shortly delivered the Armenian captives to Shapur Mihran, who delivered them to Izad Gushnasp, promising the Armenian captives to make Peroz spare them.

However, an unexpected event changed the course of events: the death of the Sasanian king Peroz I in 484 in war against the Hephthalites, causing the withdrawal of the Sasanians in Armenia and recovery of Dvin and Vagharshapat. Struggling to suppress the revolt of his brother Zarir, Peroz's successor, Balash (r. 484–488), needed the help of the Armenians: in exchange for military support, he agreed to sign the Nvarsak Treaty, which granted religious freedom to the Christians and the prohibition of Zoroastrianism in Armenia, including much greater autonomy for the nakharar. Vahan was also recognized as sparapet and the property of the Mamikonian family and its allies were returned.

Between 515–516, several Hunnic tribes kept making incursions into Armenia—the Armenian nobleman Mjej I Gnuni then decided to organize a counter-attack, where he successfully managed to repel them. As a reward, Kavadh I appointed him as the marzban of Armenia in 518. During this governorship, Mjej maintained religious peace. In 527, he repelled several other Hunnic invasions. In 548, he was succeeded by Gushnasp Bahram.

Chihor-Vishnasp, a member of the Suren family and a relative of Khosrow I himself, was in 564 appointed as marzban. During this period, the Armenian aristocracy was split between two parties, the national one which was headed by a member of the Mamikonian family, and a pro-Sasanian one, which was headed by a member of the Siunia family.

Chihor Vishnasp harshly treated the Christian Armenians who were suspected of secretly siding with the Byzantines, and he also did the same with the rest of the Christian Armenian population. Claiming to exploit on the command of the king, he persecuted the Christian Armenians and even built a fire-temple in Dvin. These actions soon resulted in a massive uprising in late 571 or early 572, which was led by Vardan III Mamikonian. On 23 February 572, the Armenian rebels seized Dvin, and had Chihor-Vishnasp killed.

==== Vardan Mamikonian ====
Sasanian king Yazdegerd II began to view Christianity in the Northern lands as a political threat to the cohesiveness of the Iranian empire. The dispute appears to be based on Iranian military considerations of the time given that according to Acts 2:9 in the Acts of the Apostles there were Persians, Parthians and Medes (all Iranian tribes) among the first new Christian converts at Pentecost and Christianity has had a long history in Iran as a minority religion, dating back to the very early years of the faith. Nevertheless, the conversion to Christianity by Armenians in the North was of particular concern to Yazdegerd II. After a successful invasion of the Eastern Roman Empire, Yazdegerd began summoning Armenian nobles to Ctesiphon and reconverted them to Zoroastrianism (a faith many Armenians shared with Iranians prior to Christianity). This upset the Armenian population, and under the leadership of Vardan Mamikonian an army of 66,000 Armenians rebelled against the Sasanian empire. Yazdegerd quickly subdued the rebellion at the Battle of Avarayr.

==== Nvarsak Treaty ====
The military success of the Iranians ensured that Armenia would remain part of the Sasanian empire for centuries to come. However, Armenian objections did not end until the Nvarsak Treaty, which guaranteed Armenia more freedom and freedom of religion (Christianity) under Sasanian rule.

=== Sasanian coins produced in Armenia ===
Sasanian government had produced gold, silver and bronze coins in Armenia. 813 of these coins were found in 34 regions in Armenia; being most of them found in Dvin (ancient city) and Gyumri. Most of these coins were silver coins.

== Viceroys ==
=== Sasanian kings of Armenia ===
Tenure	King	Notes
252/3-272	Hormizd I	Sasanian prince, nominated by his father Shapur I.
272-299	Narseh	Sasanian prince, nominated by his brother Hormizd I.

=== Marzbans of Armenia ===
Tenure	Marzban	Notes
428-442	Veh Mihr Shapur	Iranian grandee, nominated by Bahram V.
442-451	Vasak, prince of Syunik	Armenian nobleman, nominated by Yazdgerd II.
451-465	Adhur Hormizd (in Armenian sources: Adrormizd)	Iranian grandee, nominated by Yazdgerd II.
465-481	Adhur Gushnasp (in Armenian sources: Arderveshnasp)	Iranian grandee, nominated by Peroz I.
481-482	Sahak II Bagratuni	Armenian nobleman, elected by the rebellious Armenian nobles. Killed at the Battle of Akesga.
482-482	Shapur Mihran	Iranian military occupation.
482-483	Vahan I Mamikonian	Head of provisional government.
483-483	Zarmihr Karen	Iranian military occupation.
483-484	Shapur of Ray	Iranian grandee, nominated by Peroz I. Cyril Toumanoff suggests a marzpan named Andigan for the same period.
484-505/510	Vahan I Mamikonian (2nd term)	Armenian nobleman, nominated by Peroz I.
505-509 or 510-514	Vard Mamikonian ("Vard the Patrician")	Brother of Vahan I, recognized as marzpan by Kavadh I.
11 years	Several Iranian marzpans perses	According to Samuel of Ani : "After the patrician Vard, brother of Vahan, Iranian marzpans governed Armenia for 11 years ... The government of Armenia passed then to Mjej of the Gnuni family, who exercised it for 30 years".
518-548	Mjej I Gnuni	Mentioned by Cyril Toumanoff and Gérard Dédéyan, but not included by René Grousset.
548-552 or 552-554	Gushnasp Bahram	
552-560 or 554-560	Tan-Shapur	
560-564	Varazdat	
564-572	Chihor-Vishnasp	
572-573	Vardan III Mamikonian	Leader of anti-Iranian rebellion.
572-574	Golon Mihran	Iranian general tasked by Khosrau I with subduing the revolt. Cyril Toumanoff substitutes him and Vardan with Vardan-Gushnasp.
573-577	Vardan III Mamikonian	Under Byzantine protectorate. For the same period, Krikor Jacob Basmadjian a Cyril Toumanoff have Philip, prince of Syunik.
577-580	Tamkhosrau	Iranian grandee, nominated by Khosrau I.
580-581	Varaz Vzur	Iranian grandee, nominated by Hormizd IV
581-582/588	Pahlav	Iranian grandee, nominated by Hormizd IV.
582/588-588/589	Frahat	Iranian grandee, nominated by Hormizd IV.
588/589-590	Hrartin (Fravardin)	Iranian grandee, nominated by Hormizd IV.
590-591	Musel II Mamikonian	Installed by the Byzantines.
592-605	Vindatakan	These five marzpans are mentioned by Cyril Toumanoff.
592-605	Nakhvefaghan	These five marzpans are mentioned by Cyril Toumanoff.
592-605	Merakbout	These five marzpans are mentioned by Cyril Toumanoff.
592-605	Yazden	These five marzpans are mentioned by Cyril Toumanoff.
592-605	Boutmah	These five marzpans are mentioned by Cyril Toumanoff.
604-611 or 616	Smbat IV Bagratuni	Christian Settipani records him as marzpan from 599 to 607. He is not mentioned as marzpan by Toumanoff. René Grousset holds that Khosrau II named him marzpan following his victories in Hyrcania, ca. 604, and adds that he possibly continued in office until his death in 616-617. However, he also mentions three other marzpans over the same period (see following).
611-613	Shahrayeanpet	Marzpan at Dvin, in eastern Armenia, along with Shahin Vahmanzadegan as pahghospan in western (former Byzantine) Armenia
613-613	Parshenazdat	Iranian grandee, nominated by Khosrau II.
616-619	Namdar-Gushnasp	Iranian grandee, nominated by Khosrau II.
619-624	Shahraplakan (Sarablagas)	Iranian grandee, nominated by Khosrau II.
624-627	Rotshvehan	Iranian grandee, nominated by Khosrau II.
627-628		A large part of Armenia reverted to Byzantine control.
ca. 628	Varaztirots II Bagratuni	Armenian nobleman, named marzpan by Kavadh II for the portions of Armenia remaining under Iranian rule. Following the onset of the Muslim conquest of Iran, Varaztirots aligned himself with the Byzantines.
630-635	Mjej II Gnuni	Armenian nobleman, named governor of Armenia by the Byzantine emperor Heraclius.
635-638	David Saharuni	Armenian nobleman, he murdered Mjej and proclaimed himself governor. He was recognized by Heraclius, who named him kouropalates and ishkhan of Armenia.
638-643		No central authority.
643-645	Theodore Rshtuni	
645/646	Varaztirots II Bagratuni	Following the complete collapse of Iran, he was named Prince of Armenia by the Byzantines, but died before being formally invested

== Sources ==
- Daryaee, Touraj (2009). Sasanian Persia: The Rise and Fall of an Empire. I.B.Tauris. pp. 1–240. ISBN 978-0857716668.
- Basmadjian, Krikor Jacob (1914). "Chronologie de l'histoire d'Arménie". Revue de l'Orient chrétien (in French). IX (XIX): 293–294.
- Chaumont, M. L. (1986). "ARMENIA AND IRAN ii. The pre-Islamic period". Encyclopaedia Iranica, Vol. II, Fasc. 4. pp. 418–438.
- Greatrex, Geoffrey; Lieu, Samuel N. C., eds. (2002). The Roman Eastern Frontier and the Persian Wars (Part II, 363–630 AD). New York, New York and London, United Kingdom: Routledge (Taylor & Francis). ISBN 0-415-14687-9.
- Grousset, René (1947). Histoire de l'Arménie des origines à 1071 (in French). Paris: Payot.
- Toumanoff, Cyrille (1990). "Vice-rois iraniens (Marzpans) d'Arménie". Les dynasties de la Caucasie chrétienne de l'Antiquité jusqu'au xixe siècle : Tables généalogiques et chronologiques (in French). Rome. pp. 506–507.
- Settipani, Christian (2006). Continuité des élites à Byzance durant les siècles obscurs. Les princes caucasiens et l'Empire du vie au ixe siècle (in French). Paris: de Boccard. ISBN 978-2-7018-0226-8.
- Dédéyan, Gérard (2007). Histoire du peuple arménien (in French). Toulouse: Éd. Privat. ISBN 978-2-7089-6874-5.
- Kurdoghlian, Mihran; Hayots, Badmoutioun; Hador, A (1994), Armenian History (in Armenian), vol. I, Athens, Greece, pp. 56–57, 61–62.
- Babayan, Yuri, Historical province of the Greater Armenia.
- Bournoutian, George A, A History of the Armenian People, vol. II, p. 1, "Prior to the third century AD, Iran had more influence on Armenia's culture than any of its other neighbours. Intermarriage among the Iranian and Armenian nobility was common".

== See also ==
- Timeline of Armenian history
