= 451 =

451 in various calendars
- Gregorian calendar: 451; CDLI
- Ab urbe condita: 1204
- Assyrian calendar: 5201
- Balinese saka calendar: 372–373
- Bengali calendar: −143 – −142
- Berber calendar: 1401
- Buddhist calendar: 995
- Burmese calendar: −187
- Byzantine calendar: 5959–5960
- Chinese calendar: 庚寅年 (Metal Tiger); 3148 or 2941 — to — 辛卯年 (Metal Rabbit); 3149 or 2942
- Coptic calendar: 167–168
- Discordian calendar: 1617
- Ethiopian calendar: 443–444
- Hebrew calendar: 4211–4212
- Hindu calendars
- Vikram Samvat: 507–508
- Shaka Samvat: 372–373
- Kali Yuga: 3551–3552
- Holocene calendar: 10451
- Iranian calendar: 171 BP – 170 BP
- Islamic calendar: 176 BH – 175 BH
- Javanese calendar: 336–337
- Julian calendar: 451; CDLI
- Korean calendar: 2784
- Minguo calendar: 1461 before ROC 民前1461年
- Nanakshahi calendar: −1017
- Seleucid era: 762/763 AG
- Thai solar calendar: 993–994
- Tibetan calendar: ལྕགས་ཕོ་སྟག་ལོ་ (male Iron-Tiger); 577 or 196 or −576 — to — ལྕགས་མོ་ཡོས་ལོ་ (female Iron-Hare); 578 or 197 or −575

Invasion of Attila the Hun in Gaul (451)

Year 451 (CDLI) was a common year starting on Monday of the Julian calendar. At the time, it was known as the Year of the Consulship of Marcianus and Adelfius (or, less frequently, year 1204 Ab urbe condita). The denomination 451 for this year has been used since the early medieval period, when the Anno Domini calendar era became the prevalent method in Europe for naming years.

== Events ==
=== By place ===
==== Europe ====
- Spring – Attila gathers his vassals—Bastarnae, Gepids, Heruls, Ostrogoths, Rugians, Scirians and Thuringians (among others), and smashes through Germany, causing widespread panic and destruction. He arrives in Belgica with an army (50,000 men) and crosses the Rhine.
- April 7 – Attila's forces invade Gaul and sack Metz. The major cities of Strasbourg, Worms, Mainz, Trier, Cologne, Reims, Tournai, Cambrai, Amiens and Beauvais are destroyed by the Huns.
- Eudocia, daughter of Emperor Valentinian III, marries Huneric in Ravenna. The engagement serves to strengthen the alliance between the Western Roman Empire and the Vandal Kingdom.
- June – Attila approaches Aurelianum (modern Orléans) and the city's inhabitants close the gates, forcing him to lay siege. After learning of the Hun invasion, Flavius Aetius (magister militum) moves quickly from Italy into Gaul, and joins forces with Visigoth king Theodoric I.
- June 20 – Battle of the Catalaunian Plains (Châlons): Attila avoids a pitched battle near Orléans, and withdraws to the Catalaunian Plains (Champagne-Ardenne). The Roman coalition defeats the Huns, but Theodoric I is killed in the encounter. This is one of the last military victories of the Western Roman Empire, before the victories of Emperor Majorian against the Alemanni, Visigoths, Suebi and Burgundians, between 457 and 461.
- Thorismund succeeds his father Theodoric I as king of the Visigoths. He is crowned in the capital at Toulouse, and extends the Visigothic Kingdom in Hispania.

==== Egypt ====
- The Egyptian people clash with Byzantine soldiers in Alexandria rejecting Proterius of Alexandria as the new Chalcedonian Patriarch. The Egyptian rebels besieged the imperial garrison in the ancient temple of Serapis, and burned them alive. The Byzantine military eventually suppressed the uprising with heavy reinforcements.

==== Persia ====
- May 26 – Battle of Vartanantz: King Yazdegerd II defeats the Armenian army (66,000 men) under their rebel leader Vartan Mamikonian on the Avarayr Plain (Armenia). Despite the loss of Mamikonian, who is killed, the Armenians consider this battle to have been a moral and religious victory, since Yazdegerd, out of respect for their efforts, allows them to remain Christian. The anniversary is a national and religious holiday.
- Yazdegerd II issues a decree to abolish the Shabbat, and orders the execution of Jewish leaders, including the Exilarch.

=== By topic ===
==== Religion ====
- October 8 – November 1 – Council of Chalcedon, an ecumenical council of the Church: The monophysitism of Eutyches is repudiated, and the Chalcedonian Definition set forth. As a result of this council, the Oriental Orthodox Churches eventually become a separate communion. More immediately, Jerusalem becomes a Patriarchate, and Dioscorus of Alexandria is deposed as Patriarch of Alexandria by the Council.

== Births ==
- Brigit of Kildare, Irish patron saint (approximate date)
- Jacob of Serugh, Syrian poet and theologian (approximate date)

== Deaths ==
- July 29 – Tuoba Huang, prince of Northern Wei (b. 428)
- Theodoric I, king of the Visigoths
- Liu Yikang, prince of the Liu Song dynasty (b. 409)
- Pei Songzhi, Chinese historian (b. 372)
- Zeno the Prophet, Egyptian abbot and saint (approximate date)
