= 428 =

428 in various calendars
Gregorian calendar	428; CDXXVIII
Ab urbe condita	1181
Assyrian calendar	5178
Balinese saka calendar	349–350
Bengali calendar	−166 – −165
Berber calendar	1378
Buddhist calendar	972
Burmese calendar	−210
Byzantine calendar	5936–5937
Chinese calendar	丁卯年 (Fire Rabbit); 3125 or 2918 — to — 戊辰年 (Earth Dragon); 3126 or 2919
Coptic calendar	144–145
Discordian calendar	1594
Ethiopian calendar	420–421
Hebrew calendar	4188–4189
- Hindu calendars
Vikram Samvat	484–485
Shaka Samvat	349–350
Kali Yuga	3528–3529
Holocene calendar	10428
Iranian calendar	194 BP – 193 BP
Islamic calendar	200 BH – 199 BH
Javanese calendar	312–313
Julian calendar	428; CDXXVIII
Korean calendar	2761
Minguo calendar	1484 before ROC 民前1484年
Nanakshahi calendar	−1040
Seleucid era	739/740 AG
Thai solar calendar	970–971
Tibetan calendar	མེ་མོ་ཡོས་ལོ་ (female Fire-Hare); 554 or 173 or −599 — to — ས་ཕོ་འབྲུག་ལོ་ (male Earth-Dragon); 555 or 174 or −598

Year 428 (CDXXVIII) was a leap year starting on Sunday of the Julian calendar. At the time, it was known as the Year of the Consulship of Felix and Taurus (or, less frequently, year 1181 Ab urbe condita). The denomination 428 for this year has been used since the early medieval period, when the Anno Domini calendar era became the prevalent method in Europe for naming years.

== Events ==
=== By place ===
==== Roman Empire ====
- Flavius Felix is elected consul for the Western Empire and issues consular diptychs during his political office.
- Flavius Aetius gains appointment as master of both services (magister militum praesentalis), after gaining victories in Gaul over Visigoth and Frankish forces.

==== Europe ====
- King Gunderic, age 49, dies after a reign of 21 years, and is succeeded by his half-brother Genseric. He is styled with the title Rex Wandalorum et Alanorum ("King of the Vandals and Alans"). Genseric increases his power and wealth in the residence of the province of Hispania Baetica (Southern Spain).
- King Vortigern invites a number of Germanic warriors to aid him in consolidating his position in Britain, according to the Historia Brittonum. He hires Saxons who are probably settled in Kent as mercenaries to fight against the Picts and the Scots beyond Hadrian's Wall.
- Frankish War (428): Commander-in-chief of the Roman army Aetius put an end to the invasion of Chlodio, king of the Salian Franks in Northern Gaul.

==== Asia ====
- Artaxias IV, last king of Greater Armenia, is deposed by Bahram V. The Arshakuni Dynasty ends and the kingdom becomes a province of the Persian Empire.

=== By topic ===
==== Astronomy ====
- October 26 – The planet Venus occults the planet Jupiter.

==== Religion ====
- April 10 – Nestorius is made patriarch of Constantinople. He preaches a new doctrine, that will be called Nestorianism. It makes a distinction between the divine and human natures of Jesus, but comes under immediate attack from Pope Celestine I, and Cyril of Alexandria.
- Hydatius becomes bishop of Aquae Flaviae in Gallaecia (modern Chaves) in Portugal.
- John succeeds Theodotus as patriarch of Antioch, and gives his support to Nestorius.
- Euthymius the Great builds a monastery in Palestine, near the Dead Sea.

== Births ==
- Tuoba Huang, prince of the Xianbei state Northern Wei (d. 451)

== Deaths ==
- Gunderic, king of the Vandals and Alans (b. 379)
- Qifu Chipan, prince of the Xianbei state Western Qin
- Theodore of Mopsuestia, bishop and theologian
