= Varazdat (marzban) =

6th-century Sasanian marzban

Varazdat (Middle Persian: Warāzdātan), was an Iranian nobleman who served as the marzban of Persian Armenia from 560 to 564. During his governorship, Armenia was relatively peaceful. In 561, the Sasanian Empire and the Byzantine Empire, concluded a peace treaty known as the "Fifty-Year Peace Treaty", which ended the Lazic War. In 564, Varazdat was succeeded by Chihor-Vishnasp.

== Sources ==
- Dodgeon, Michael H.; Greatrex, Geoffrey; Lieu, Samuel N. C. (2002b), The Roman Eastern Frontier and the Persian Wars (Part II, 363-630 AD), Routledge, ISBN 0-415-00342-3.
- (in French) Les dynasties de la Caucasie chrétienne de l’Antiquité jusqu’au XIXe siècle; Tables généalogiques et chronologiques, Rome, 1990.

Preceded by Tan-Shapur	Marzban of Persian Armenia; 560–564	Succeeded by Chihor-Vishnasp
