= List of Iranian titles and ranks =

The following is a list of various titles associated with religion, politics, nobility, or the military, as used by various Iranian peoples and dynasties.

== By dynasty ==
=== Median ===
==== Military ====
Taxmaspada (Spada)
army
Asbari
literally meaning "horse bearers", cavalry
Anuvaniya
archers
Rsika
spearmen
Pasti
infantry

=== Achaemenid ===
==== Military ====
Anusiya
companions, believed to be the word of which the Persian Immortals is derived
Kara
literally meaning "peoples army", designation applied to the early armies of Cyrus the Great
Navpati/naupati
Naval commander
Sparabara
Literally meaning shield (spara) bearer

==== Political ====
Khshathrapāvā
governor
Databdara
Administrator of the courts, literally meaning "law bearer", who may have been a combination of the modern-day judge, law officer, or constable

==== Religious ====
Saoshyant
Zoroastrian notion, similar to "Messiah"

=== Sasanian ===
==== Military ====
Vuzurg framadhār
Great commander; managed the affairs of state
Aspbad
Commander of the Savaran
Sardar
Savaran
Arzbad-e-Aspwaragan
Chief instructor of the Savaran
Spahbed
Army general who could also be a military governor
Marzban
Province governor, and the same role as a spahbed or strictly an army general in the province
Padgospan
Assistant of the spahbad
Padan
Spahbed's officers
Framandar
Battle field commanders
Paygospan
Provincial military commanders
Arteshtaran-salar
Chief of Warriors, a term reserved for warriors displaying great bravery in battle

==== Political ====
Eran-Spahbad
Minister of Defense and commander in chief of the army
Andarzbad
Counsel to the Shah.
Kanarange (Eastern Iranian term)
The title given to a marzban of Central Asia
Istandar
Leader of an istan (a province or district area within a province)
Argbadh
Highest military title and was held by members of the royal family
Rasnan
A less defined title
Artabid
Title for Azadan families who were entrusted with specific duties, such as crowning each new monarch
Karrogbadh
Chief of imperial workers; a rather unimportant position mostly delegated to Christians, especially during the reign of Khosrow II.
Vastrioshan Salar
Minister of agriculture, commerce and industries.
Vuzurgan
Grand nobles, who would be present at coronation ceremonies

==== Religious ====
Hirbad
or Hirbod/Herbed; Protector and caretaker of fire temple, Zoroastrian judge and arbiter.
Mogh
Zoroastrian Magi (plural: Moghan)
Mobad
or Mowbed; High-ranking Priest (moghpati, moghbadh; plural: Mobadan)
Mobadan Mobad
or Mowbedan Mowbed; Chief of the clergy

=== Safavid ===
Dah-bashi
Commander of 10 soldiers (lit. head of 10)
Yuz-bashi
Commander of 100 soldiers
Amir Tuman
Commander of 1000 soldiers

=== Qajar ===
==== Political ====
Malekeh
Queen
Malekeh Jahan
World Queen, title shared by Malek Jahan Khanom, Naser al-Din Shah's mother, and Malekeh Jahan, Mohammad Ali Shah's wife.
Mahd-e Oliaa
"Queen Mother" (lit. Mahd = hearth or cradle; Olia' = most high; thus = "most high hearth or cradle" or "most high life giving place"; i.e., place from whence one is born, and thus more elegantly translated as "Sublime Cradle." Hence the title bearer is the mother of the next Shah), associated with some Qajar queens, especially Asiye Khanum Ezzeddin, Fath Ali Shah's mother, and Malek Jahan Khanom.
A'laa Hazrat
"Your Most High Majesty" in reference to the king. Appellation of Persian/Iranian kings.
Oliaa' Hazrat
Literally meaning "Your Most High Majesty" in reference to the Queen. Title specifically created for Malekeh Jahan.
Khan
Leader, usually of a tribe
Shahzadeh
Prince, used specifically to refer to Qajar princes

== By people ==
=== Kurds ===
Peshmerga
the term used by Kurds to refer to armed Kurdish fighters.

== Imperial and Royal titles ==
Shahanshah
Emperor (lit. "King of Kings")
Shah
King
Keyaksar (Cyaxares)
The one high King
Padeshah
Great King
Shahzadeh
Prince (lit. "born of a king" i.e., "of kingly birth or parentage")
Arranshah
King of Arran
Layzanshah
King of Layzan
Shirvanshah
King of Shirvan (see also: Shirvanshahs)
