= Chihor-Vishnasp =

6th-century Iranian military officer

Marzban of Persian Armenia
- In office 564–572
- Monarch: Khosrau I
- Preceded by: Varazdat
- Succeeded by: Vardan III Mamikonian

Personal details
- Died: 23 February 572 Dvin, Persian Armenia

Chihor-Vishnasp Suren, also known as Chihr-Gushnasp and Suren, was an Iranian military officer from the Suren family, who served as the governor (marzban) of Persian Armenia from 564 until his murder on 23 February 572 by the Armenian rebel Vardan III Mamikonian.

== Biography ==
A member of the Suren family and a relative of the Sasanian king Khosrau I himself, Chihor-Vishnasp enjoyed a high status, and served as the hazarapet (minister of the interior) of Persian Armenia, before he was appointed as the marzban of the province in 564. During this period, the Armenian aristocracy was split between two parties, the national one which was headed by a member of the Mamikonian family, and a pro-Sasanian one, which was headed by a member of the Siunia family.

Chihor Vishnasp not only harshly treated the Christian Armenians who were suspected of secretly siding with the Byzantines, but also did the same with the rest of the Christian Armenian population. Claiming to exploit on the command of the king, he persecuted the Christian Armenians and even built a fire-temple in their capital, Dvin. These actions soon resulted in a massive uprising in late 571 or early 572, which was led by Vardan III Mamikonian. On 23 February 572, the Armenian rebels managed to capture Dvin, and had Chihor-Vishnasp killed.

== Sources ==
- Greatrex, Geoffrey; Lieu, Samuel N. C. (2002). The Roman Eastern Frontier and the Persian Wars (Part II, 363–630 AD). New York, New York and London, United Kingdom: Routledge (Taylor & Francis). ISBN 0-415-14687-9.
- Chaumont, M. L. (1986). "ARMENIA AND IRAN ii. The pre-Islamic period". Encyclopaedia Iranica, Vol. II, Fasc. 4. pp. 418–438.

Preceded by Varazdat	Marzban of Persian Armenia; 564–572	Succeeded by Vardan III Mamikonian
