= Gohar Muradyan =

Armenian philologist and translator (born 1957)

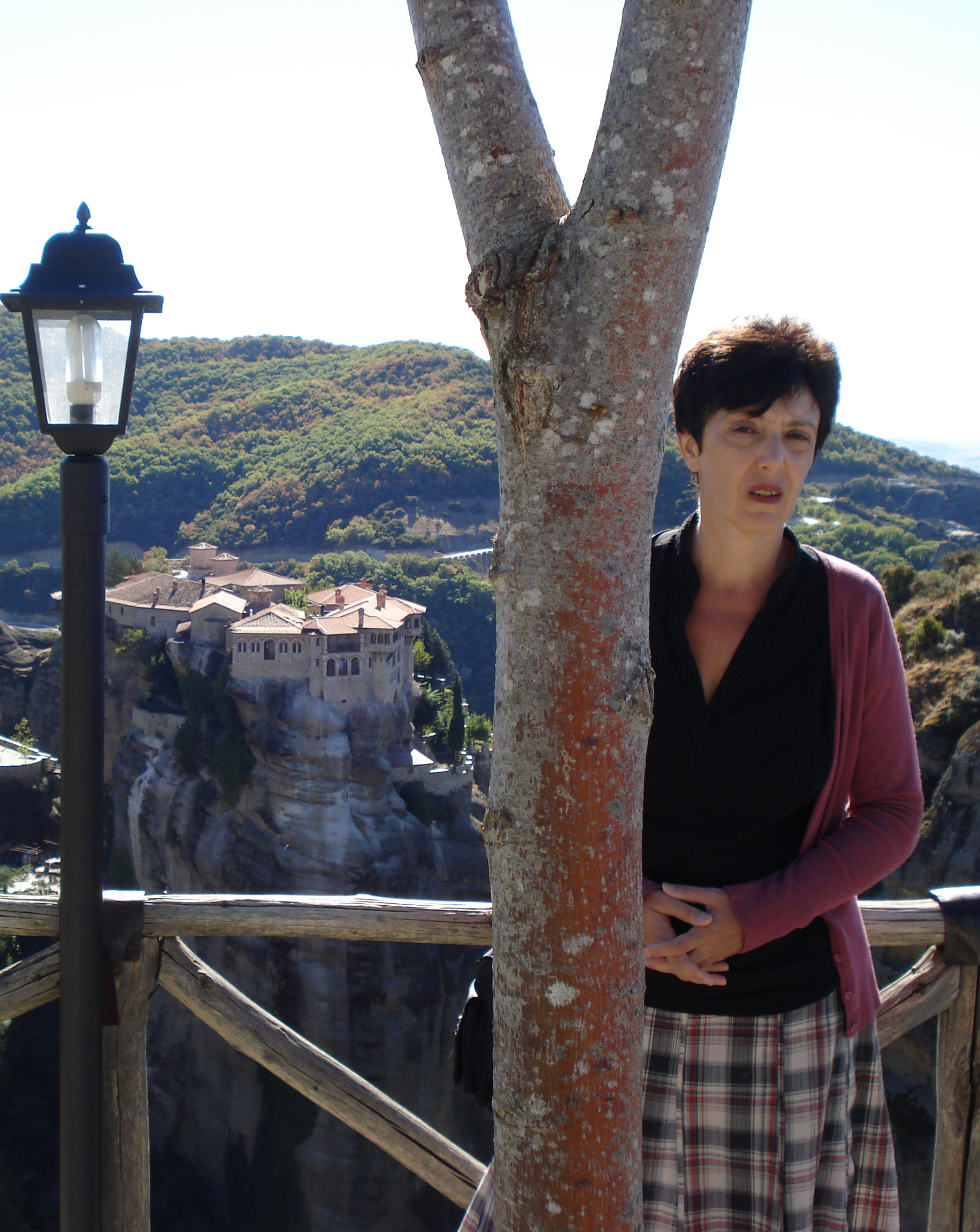
- Gohar Muradyan in 2013
- Born: October 28, 1957 (age 68); Yerevan
- Education: Leningrad State University
- Known for: philologist, translator

Gohar Muradyan (born October 28, 1957, Yerevan) is an Armenian philologist and translator. She is a senior researcher and head of the Department for the Study of Translated Literature at the Matenadaran in Yerevan, Armenia.

== Life ==
Muradyan was born on October 28, 1957, in Yerevan. From 1969 to 1974 she studied at the English School No. 172 in Yerevan. From 1974 to 1979 she studied at the Faculty of Philology of Leningrad State University. From 1979 to 1982 she did her Postgraduate studies at the Institute of Oriental Studies of Armenian National Academy of Sciences; her dissertation advisor was academician Gagik Sargsyan. Muradyan has worked at the Matenadaran since 1982. She became a senior researcher there in 1998. In 2014 she became the Head of the Department of Study and Translation of Old Texts.

She has published critical editions of texts, monographs and articles on old Armenian translations from Greek.

In 1986 she successfully defended her dissertation titled The Book of Chreia and its Sources, receiving the degree of Candidate of Philological Sciences. She became a member of the Association Internationale des Études Arméniennes (AIEA) in November 2001. In 2005 received the degree of Doctor of Philological Sciences for her dissertation titled The Hellenizing School and Classical Armenian.

She has taken part in many international conferences and joint research projects, cooperating with authoritative research institutions: in 1996-1997 with the Max-Planck-Institut für europäische Rechtsgeschichte (Frankfurt am Main), in 1998 with the Netherlands Institute of Advanced Studies, in 1999–2002, 2001–2004, 2005–2007 with the University of Geneva, in 2008–2009 with the Graz University, in 2007–2012 with the University of Nebraska–Lincoln. This cooperation resulted in monographs, articles and translations in Armenian, English, French and Russian.

== Critical Editions of Texts ==
- Գիրք պիտոյից (Book of Chreia), critical edition by G. Muradyan, Yerevan, Armenian Academy Publishing House, 1993.
- Physiologus, The Greek and Armenian Versions with a Study of Translation Technique, by G. Muradyan, Leuven-Paris-Dudley, MA։ Peeters (Hebrew University Armenian Studies 6), 2005.
- Գրիգոր Մագիստրոսի Թուղթք և չափաբերականք (Letters and Verses by Grigor Magistros), critical text and Introduction, (Medieval Armenian Literature), 11th c., vol. 16, Yerevan, Nairi, 2012, pp. 139–481.
- David the Invincible, Commentary on Porphyry's Isagoge, Old Armenian Text with the Greek Original, an English Translation, Introduction and Notes by Gohar Muradyan, Leiden-Boston։ Brill, 2014.
- Դաւիթ Անյաղթին վերագրուած եւ նրա անուանն առնչուող գրուածքներ (Writings Ascribed to David the Invincible and Related to Him), critical text and introduction, Medieval Armenian Literature, 12th c., Mkhitar Gosh, vol. 20, Yerevan: Nairi, 2014, Appendix, pp. 613–782.
- Old Armenian Versions of the Dialectics by John of Damascus. Critical Texts and Study (John of Damascus, Armenian Translations, volume I), Yerevan, 2019, 316 pp.
- Old Armenian Version of the Exact Exposition of the Orthodox Faith by John of Damascus. Critical Text and Study (John of Damascus, Armenian Translations, volume II), Yerevan, 2023, 360 pp.

== Monographs ==
- Catalogue of the Armenian manuscript fragments of the Mekhitarist library in Vienna (co-author Aram Topchyan, with an afterword by Erich Renhart), bilingual Armenian-English edition, Yerevan: Ankyunakar Publishing, 2012, 374 p.
- Հունաբանությունները դասական հայերենում, Yerevan: Nairi, 2010, 291 p. English translation: Grecisms in Ancient Armenian, Leuven-Paris-Dudley, MA։ Peeters (Hebrew University Armenian Studies 13), 2012, 280 p.
- Հին հունական առասպելների արձագանքները հայ միջնադարյան մատենագրության մեջ, Yerevan: Nairi, 2014, 299 p. English translation: Ancient Greek Myths in Medieval Armenian Literature, Brill, 2022.

== Articles ==
- * "Греческая надпись царя Тиридата из Гарни" ("The Greek Inscription of King Trdat from Garni"), Historico-Philological Journal of the Armenian Academy of Sciences, 1981, N 3, pp. 81–94.
- «Խորենացու երկու աղբյուրի թվագրման շուրջը» ("On the Dating Khorenatsi's Two Sources"), Historico-Philological Journal of the Armenian Academy of Sciences, 1990, N 4, pp. 94–104.
- "Первоначальный полный сборник Афтония и древнеармянская Книга хрий" ("The Original Complete Collection of Aphthonius and the Old Armenian Book of Chreia"), Vizantijskij vremennik, 1994, вып. 55/1, pp. 141–144.
- "The Reflection of Foreign Proper Names, Theonyms and Mythological Creatures in the Ancient Armenian Translations from Greek," Revue des Études Arméniennes, t. XXV, 1994–95, pp. 63–76.
- "The Original Complete Collection of Aphthonius' Progymnasmata and the Armenian Book of Chreia", Acts, XVIII International Congress of Byzantine Studies, Selected Papers։ Moscow 1991, Volume IV։ Literature, Sources, Numismatics and History of Science, Byzantine Studies Press, Inc., Shepherdstown, WV, US, 1996, 181–187.
- "Some Lexicological Characteristics of the Armenian Version of Philo Alexandrinus," Proceedings of the Fifth International Conference on Armenian Linguistics (McGill University, Montreal, May 1–5, 1995). Ed. by D. Sakayan, New York, 1996, pp. 279–291.
- «Փիլոն Ալեքսանդրացու գրաբար թարգմանությունների լեզվական որոշ առանձնահատկությունները» ("Some Lexicological Characteristics of the Armenian Version of Philo Alexandrinus"), Historico-Philological Journal of the Armenian Academy of Sciences, 1997, N 1, pp. 167–176.
- "The Rhetorical Exercises (Progymnasmata) in the Old Armenian "Book of Chreia" (Girk' pitoyic') – Translation or Original Composition? (On the Occasion of P. Cowe's Review)," Revue des Études Arméniennes, t. 27, 1998-99, pp. 399–415.
- «Արտաշիրի վեպն Ագաթանգեղոսյան բնագրերում» ("The Romance of Artashir in the Texts of Agathangelus"), Ashtanak (Armenological Periodical) 2, Yerevan, 1998, pp. 46–55.
- "Notes on Some Linguistic Characteristics of the Hellenizing Translations," Le Muséon, t. 112, fasc. 1-2, 1999, pp. 65–71.
- «Դասական և յունաբան թարգմանութիւնների բաղդատութեան փորձ» ("An Attempt of Collation of Classical and Hellenizing Translations"), Handes Amsorya, 1999, pp. 187–216.
- "The Armenian Collection of the Ecclesiastical Canons," Христианский Восток (Christian Orient), Moscow, NS 1 (7), 1999, pp. 124–154 (co-author M. Shirinian).
- «Հունարենից թարգմանված եկեղեցական կանոնները, բնագրագիտական դիտողություններ» ("The Ecclesiastical Canons Translated from Greek; Textological Observations") (co-author M. Shirinian), Historico-Philological Journal of the Armenian Academy of Sciences, 2000, N 3, pp. 213–225.
- «Պիտոյից գիրքը՝ քրիստոնեացված ճարտասանական ձեռնարկ» ("The Book of Chreia – a Christianized Rhetorical Handbook"), Handes Amsorya, 2000, pp. 2–67.
- "Le style hellénisant des Progymnasmata arméniens dans le contexte d'autres écrits originaux," Actes du Sixième Colloque international de Linguistique arménienne (INALCO – Académie des Inscriptions et Belles-Lettres – 5-9 juillet 1999), Slovo, vol. 26-27 (2001-2002), pp. 83–94.
- "Pre-hellenizing Translations," in Bnagirk‛ Yišatakac‛ - Documenta memoriae; Dall'Italia e dall'Armenia Studi in onore di Gabriella Uluhogian, Bologna, 2004, pp. 297–315.
- «Հրատ, Լուսաբեր, Փայլածու, Երեւակ, Լուսնաթագ», Handes Amsorya, 2006, pp. 1–18.
- "Les traductions arméniennes de la littérature antique et médiévale," dans Arménie, la magie de l'écrit (publié à l'occasion de l'exposition Arménie, la magie de l'écrit։ Marseille, Centre de la Vieille Charité, 27 avril – 22 juillet 2007), sous la direction de Claude Mutafian (Marseille, 2007), pp. 288–291.
- «Դավիթ Անհաղթի «Վերլուծութիւն ի Ներածութիւնն Պորփիւրի» երկը. տեքստաբանական հարցեր» ("David the Invincible's Commentary on Porphyry's Isagoge; Textological Issues"), Bulletin of Matenadaran, 18, 2008, pp. 19–39.
- "David the Invincible's Commentary on Porphyry's Isagoge. A Collation of the Greek and Armenian Versions," L'œvre de David l'Invincible et la transmission de la pensée grecque dans la tradition arménienne et syriaque, textes réunis et édités par Valentina Calzolari et Jonathan Barnes (Philosophia antiqua։ Commentaria in Aristotelem Armeniaca – Davidis Opera, vol. 1), Brill։ Leiden – Boston, 2009, pp. 67–88.
- «Սահակի տեսիլը Ղազար Փարպեցու «Պատմության» մեջ» ("The Vision of St. Sahak in the History of Łazar P'arpec'i"), Լևոն Խաչիկյան 90, Նյութեր Մատենադարանի հիմնադիր տնօրենի ծննդյան իննսունամյակի նվիրված միջազգային գիտաժողովի (9-11 հոկտեմբերի 2008 թ.) (Levon Khachikyan 90. Papers of the International Conference Dedicated to the 90th Anniversary of the Founder and First Director of Matenadaran [October 9–11, 2008]), Yerevan, 2010, pp. 193–201.
- «Գրիգոր Մագիստրոսի Մատենագրությունը» ("The Literary Legacy of Grigor Magistros") and Book Reviews, Bulletin of Matenadaran, 20, 2014, pp. 5–44, 477–494.
- "Greek Authors and Subject-matters in the Letters of Grigor Magistros", Revue des Études Arméniennes, 35, 2013, pp. 29–77.
- "Средневековые греко-армянские литературные связи" ("Medieval Greek-Armenian Literary Relations"), Рубежи памяти։ Судьбы культурного наследия в Армении и России. Труды международной научной конференции (Frontiers of Memory, The Fate of Cultural Legacy of Armenia and Russia. Papers of the International Conference), Saint-Petersburg, 2014, pp. 80–93.
- "The Vision of St. Sahak in the History of Łazar P'arpec'i", The Armenian Apocalyptic Tradition, Leiden-Boston։ Brill, 2014, pp. 315–325.
- "The Hellenizing School", Armenian Philology in the Modern Era, From Manuscript to Digital Text, Edited by Valentina Calzolari, University of Geneva. With the Collaboration of Michael E. Stone (Handbook of Oriental Studies. Section 8 Uralic & Central Asian Studies, Volume 23/1), Leiden & Boston, Brill, 2014, pp. 321–348.
- "Armenian Culture and Classical Antiquity" (co-author A. Kazaryan), "Medieval Greek-Armenian Literary Relations,"A Handbook to Classical Reception in Eastern and Central Europe, ed. by Z. Martirosova Torlone, D. LaCrouse Munteanu, D. Dutch, Wiley Blackwell, 2017, pp. 509–515, 516–527.
- “The Armenian Tradition” (with Aram Topchyan), The Multiligual Physiologus. Studies in the Oldest Greek Recension and Its Translations, ed. by Caroline Macé, Jost Gippert (Instrumenta Patristica et Medievalia, Research on the Inheritance of Early and medieval Christianity 84), Brepols, 2021, pp. 281–303.

== Translations ==
- Ապոլլոդորոս, Դիցաբանական գրադարան (Apollodorus, Mythological Library), Translation from Old Greek, Introduction and Commentary by Gohar Muradyan and Aram Topchyan, Yerevan: Sargis Khachents – Printinfo – Antares, 2017։
- Հովսեփ Էմին, Հովսեփ Էմինի կյանքն ու արկածները (Joseph Emin, "The Life and Adventures of Joseph Emin"), Translated from English by Gohar Muradyan and Aram Topchyan, Yerevan: Zangak, 2018:
- Պուբլուս Վերգիլիուս Մարո, Էնեական (Publius Vergilius Maro, "Aeneid"), Translation from Latin, Introduction and Commentary by Gohar Muradyan and Aram Topchyan, Yerevan: Zangak, 2018:
- Պուբլիուս Օվիդիուս Նասո, Կերպարանափոխություններ (Publius Ovidius Naso, "Metamorphoses"), Translation from Old Greek, Introduction and Commentary by Gohar Muradyan and Aram Topchyan, Yerevan: Zangak, 2021:
- Եվրիպիդես, Ողբերգություններ, հին հունարենից թարգմանությունը, առաջաբանն ու ծանոթագրությունները՝ Գոհար Մուրադյանի և Արամ Թոփչյանի, Երևան, «Զանգակ» հրատ., 2021:
- Հոմերոս, Իլիական, հին հունարենից թարգմանությունը, առաջաբանն ու ծանոթագրությունները՝ Գոհար Մուրադյանի և Արամ Թոփչյանի, Երևան, «Զանգակ» հրատ., 2022.
- Մարկուս Ավրելիուս Անտոնինուս, Խորհրդածություններ (Marcus Aurelius Antoninus, "Meditations"), Translation from Old Greek, Introduction and Commentary by Gohar Muradyan and Aram Topchyan, Yerevan: Zangak, 2018:
- Լոնգոս, Դափնիս և Քլոե (Longus, Daphnis and Chloe), Translation from Old Greek, Introduction and Commentary by Gohar Muradyan and Aram Topchyan, Illustrations by Arto Tchakmakchian, Yerevan: Sargis Khachents – Printinfo, 2011.
- Մայքլ Է. Սթոուն, Տիգրան Գույումճեան, Հեննինգ Լեմանն, Հայկական հնագրութեան ալբոմ (Michael Stone, Dickran Kouymjian, Henning Lehmann, Album of Armenian Paleography), Translated from English by Gohar Muradyan and Aram Topchyan, Mother See of Holy Etchmiadzin, Yerevan: Tigran Medzn Press, 2006, 556 p..
- Книга Хрий (Book of Chreia), Russian Translation from Old Armenian, Introduction and Commentaryby G. Muradyan, Yerevan: Nairi, 2000.
- The Ancient Armenian Calendar, Translated from Classical Armenian into English by Gohar Muradyan and Aram Topchyan, Yerevan։ Magaghat Publishing House, 2002.
- The Armenian Version of the Greek Ecclesiastical Canons by Gohar Muradyan, Manea-Erna Shirinyan and Aram Topchyan, Frankfurt am Main։ Lowenklau-Gesellschaft e.V., 2010.
- Excerpts from Philo of Alexandria's Questions and Answers on Genesis and Questions and Answers on Exodus; Pseudo-Philo, On Jonah and On Samson, Translated from Old Armenian with an Introduction and Commentary by Gohar Muradyan and Aram Topchyan, in Outside the Bible, Ancient Jewish Writings Related to Scripture, Ed. Louis H. Feldman, James L. Kugel, and Lawrence H. Schiffman, 3 Vols., University of Nebraska Press, 2013, pp. 750–803, 807–881.
