= Adhur Gushnasp =

Marzban in Armenia from 465 to 482

Marzban of Armenia
- In office 465–482
- Monarch: Peroz I
- Preceded by: Adhur-Hormizd
- Succeeded by: Sahak II Bagratuni

Personal details
- Died: 482 Akori, Armenia

Adhur Gushnasp (also spelled Arderveshnasp) was the marzban ("margrave") of the Sasanian province of Armenia from 465 to 482. He was killed during the Armenian rebellion of 482–484, and replaced by Sahak II Bagratuni.

== Biography ==
Map of the Caucasus

Adhur Gushnasp is first mentioned in 465, when he was appointed as the marzban ("margrave") of the province of Armenia by the King of Kings (shahanshah) Peroz I (r. 459–484), thus replacing its previous marzban Adhur-Hormizd. The country was at the time dissatisfied with Zoroastrian Sasanian rule. The policies of the previous shahanshah Yazdegerd II (r. 438–457) of integrating the Christian nobility into the bureaucracy by forcing them to convert to Zoroastrianism had resulted in a large-scale rebellion in 451, led by the Armenian military leader Vardan Mamikonian. Although the Sasanians defeated the rebels at the Battle of Avarayr, the impact of the rebellion was still felt, and tensions continued to grow. In 482, a secret meeting took place between a group of Christian Armenians, who prepared to rebel under the leadership of Vahan Mamikonian, a nephew of Vardan.

Varaz-Shapur Amatuni, who was present in the meeting, informed Adhur Gushnasp of the impending uprising, which made him abandon the Armenian capital of Dvin and leave for the fortress of Ani, where he briefly stayed for a day, and then fled to the city of Artaxata whilst being chased by the rebels. They soon besieged the city, but Adhur Gushnasp managed to escape by night and reached the neighbouring province of Adurbadagan. At the same time, discord was occurring amongst the rebels, with a certain Varaz-Narseh, prince of Urts, pillaging the city of Brhnavezh. (Note: This is the only time in history that Varaz-Narseh and his House—The Princes of Urts—are mentioned.) The rebels installed the aspet Sahak II Bagratuni as the new marzban of Armenia. Raising a force of 7,000 troops from Adurbadagan and its surroundings, Adhur Gushnasp returned to Armenia. He soon clashed with a force of 400 men led by Vasak Mamikonian and Babgen Siwni near Akori, but was defeated and killed.

== Sources ==
- Avdoyan, Levon (2018). "Avarayr, Battle of (Awarayr)". In Nicholson, Oliver (ed.). The Oxford Dictionary of Late Antiquity. Oxford: Oxford University Press. ISBN 978-0-19-866277-8.
- Basmadjian, Krikor Jacob (1914). "Chronologie de l'histoire d'Arménie". Revue de l'Orient chrétien (in French). IX (XIX): 293–294.
- Bonner, Michael (2020). The Last Empire of Iran. New York: Gorgias Press. pp. 1–406. ISBN 978-1463206161.
- Chaumont, M. L. (1986). "Armenia and Iran ii. The pre-Islamic period". Encyclopaedia Iranica, Vol. II, Fasc. 4. pp. 418–438.
- Grousset, René (1947). Histoire de l'Arménie des origines à 1071 (in French). Paris: Payot.
- Sauer, Eberhard (2017). Sasanian Persia: Between Rome and the Steppes of Eurasia. London and New York: Edinburgh University Press. pp. 1–336. ISBN 9781474401029.
- Toumanoff, Cyril (1961). "Introduction to Christian Caucasian History: II: States and Dynasties of the Formative Period". Traditio. 17. Cambridge University Press: 1–106. doi:10.1017/S0362152900008473. JSTOR 27830424. S2CID 151524770. (registration required)

Preceded by Adhur Hormizd	Marzban of Sasanian Armenia; 465–482	Succeeded by Sahak II Bagratuni
