= Veh Mihr Shapur =

Sasanian military officer

Veh Mihr Shapur (died 442) was a Sasanian military officer and the first Marzban of Armenia from 428 to 442. Veh Mihr Shapur died in 442 and was succeeded by Vasak of Syunik.

== Sources ==
- Grousset, René (1947). Histoire de l'Arménie des origines à 1071 (in French). Paris: Payot.
