= Yves Ternon =

French physician

Yves Ternon (French: [tɛʁnɔ̃]; born 1932 in Saint-Mandé) is a French physician and medical historian, as well as an author of historical books about the Jewish Holocaust and the Armenian genocide. He is a Doctor of History and professor of the history of medicine at University Paris IV Sorbonne. He is also an active member of Doctors Without Borders organization.

== Biography ==
Born in 1932, Yves Ternon first served as an intern at Paris hospitals (1955-1959) before becoming a senior resident at the Paris Faculty of Medicine. He has been conducting research on the Jewish and Armenian genocides since 1965. Recognized as a specialist in the origins of crimes against humanity, he is the author of numerous historical works, including "The Armenians: History of a Genocide", "The Armenian Cause", "Inquiry into the Denial of a Genocide", and "Armenia 1900". He is a member of the international scientific committee of the Shoah Memorial and president of the scientific council for the centenary of the Armenian Genocide (April 2015).

== Books ==
- Histoire de la médecine SS (with Socrate Helman), Paris, Casterman, 1969
- Le Massacre des aliénés (with Socrate Helman), Paris, Casterman, 1971
- Les médecins allemands et le national-socialisme (with Socrate Helman), Paris, Casterman, 1973
- Les Arméniens. Histoire d'un génocide, Paris, Seuil, 1977 and 1996
- La Cause Arménienne, Paris, Seuil, 1983
- 1917-1921, Makhno, Brussels, Complexe, 1987.
- Enquête sur la négation d'un génocide, Marseilles, Parenthèses, 1989
- Raspoutine, une tragédie russe, Brussels, Complexe, 1991 and Brussels, André Versaille, 2011
- L’État criminel. Les génocides au XXe siècle, Paris, Seuil, 1995.
- Du négationnisme. Mémoire et tabou, Paris, Desclée de Brouwer, 1999
- L’innocence des victimes : regard sur les génocides du XXe siècle, Paris, Desclée de Brouwer, 2001.
- Empire ottoman. Le déclin, la chute, l’effacement, Paris, Éditions du Félin et Éditions Michel de Maule, 2002
- 1915, le génocide des Arméniens (with Gérard Chaliand), Brusells, Complexe, 2006 (5e édition revue et augmentée)
- Éclats de Voix. Recueils de textes 1974-2005, Paris, Éditions du félin (Poche), 2006
- Mardin 1915: Anatomie pathologique d’une destruction, Paris, Librairie orientaliste Paul Geuthner, 2007
- Guerres et génocides au XXe siècle, Paris, Odile Jacob, 2007
- 7, rue de Chelles - Pour ce que nous avons tous été enfants..., Paris, Éditions du félin, 2009.
