= Gérard Dédéyan =

French professor of medieval history

Gérard Dédéyan (4 February 1942, Nantes) is a French professor of medieval history at the Paul Valéry University, Montpellier III, a member of the Armenian National Academy of Sciences and associate member of the Collège de France. He studied Classical Armenian with Frédéric-Armand Feydit.

In 1983, Dédéyan won the Prix Biguet of the Académie Française for his "Histoire des Arméniens.

Professor Charles Dédéyan was his father.

== Bibliography ==
- Les pouvoirs arméniens dans le Proche-Orient Méditerranéen (1068-1144) 5 vol., doctoral thesis, Paris 1, 1990 OCLC 490070319.
- Smbat le Connétable, introduction, translation and notes by Gérard Dédéyan, La Chronique attribuée au connétable Smbat, Geuthner, Paris, 1980 OCLC 9944662.
- Les Arméniens, histoire d'une chrétienté, Privat, Toulouse, 1990 ISBN 978-2708953567.
- et al., Arménie : 3000 ans d'histoire, Éditions Faton, coll. « Les Dossiers d'archéologie », n° 177, Dijon, 1992 OCLC 233995529.
- with Jacques Le Goff, La Méditerranée au temps de saint Louis, Aigues-Mortes colloquium, 25 and 26 April 1997, Éd. du SIVOM d'Aigues-Mortes, 2001 ISBN 978-2951646704.
- (dir.), Les Arméniens entre Grecs, Musulmans et Croisés : étude sur les pouvoirs arméniens dans le Proche-Orient méditerranéen (1068–1150), 2 vol., Fundação Calouste Gulbenkian, Lisbonne, 2003 OCLC 62347720.
- with Isabelle Augé and Gérard Dédéyan (dir.), L'Église arménienne entre Grecs et Latins : fin XIe milieu Ve, Geuthner, Paris, 2009 ISBN 978-2705338183.
- with Karam Rizk (dir.), Le comté de Tripoli : État multiculturel et multiconfessionnel, 1102–1289, actes des journées d'études, Université Saint-Esprit, Kaslik, Liban, December 2002, Geuthner, Paris, 2010 ISBN 978-2705338398.
- Alphonse Cillière (presented by Gérard Dédéyan, Claire Mouradian and Yves Ternon), 1895 — Massacres d'Arméniens, Privat, coll. « Témoignages pour l'histoire », Toulouse, 2010 ISBN 978-2-7089-6897-4.
- Gérard Dédéyan, Carol Iancu, (dir.), Du génocide des arméniens à la Shoah : Typologie des massacres du XXe siècle, Privat, coll. « Regards sur l'histoire » Toulouse, 2015, 640p. ISBN 978-2-7089-6955-1.
