= Treaty of Nvarsak =

484 treaty between Armenia and the Sasanian Empire

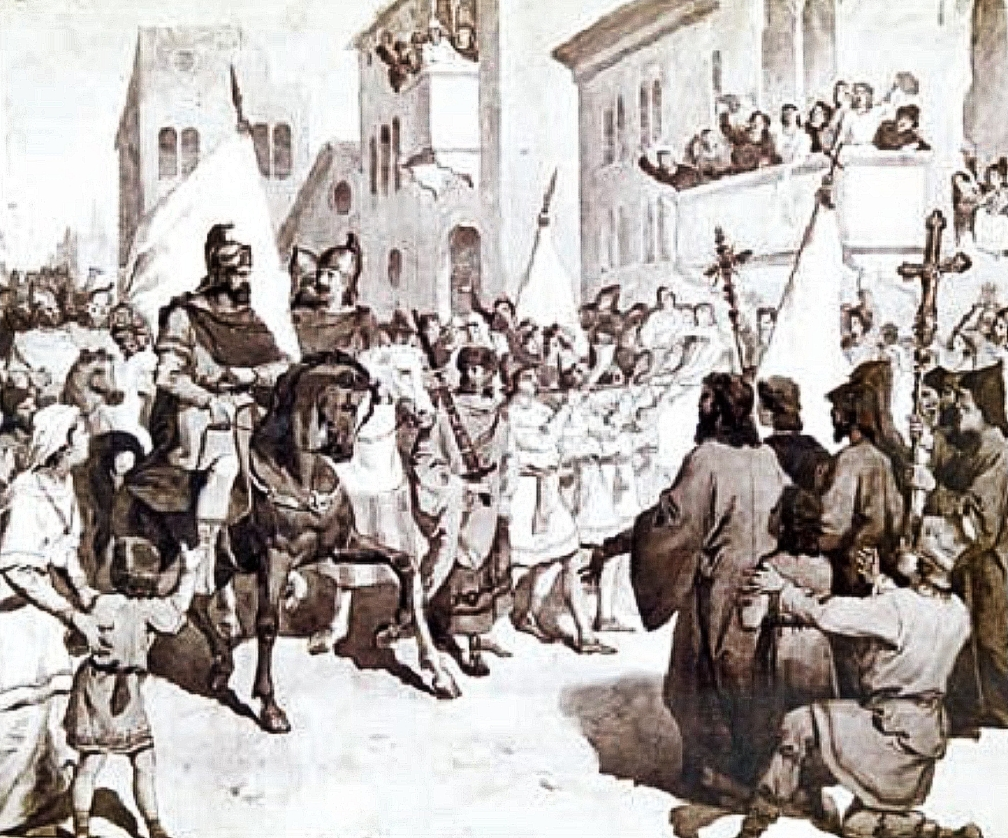
19th-century illustration of Vahan Mamikonian and his men returning to the Armenian capital of Dvin

The Treaty of Nvarsak (also spelled Nuarsak) was signed between the Armenian rebel leader Vahan Mamikonian and the representatives of the Sasanian King of Kings (shahanshah) Balash (r. 484–488) at Nvarsak in 484.

== Overview ==
The Nvarsak Treaty was concluded after the previous Sasanian shahanshah Peroz I (r. 459–484) was killed by the Hephthalites amid Armenian guerrilla efforts. This treaty ensured religious freedom and autonomy for Armenians.

The conditions of the treaty were as follows:

1. All existing fire-altars in Armenia should be destroyed and no new ones should be constructed.
2. Christians in Armenia should have freedom of worship and conversions to Zoroastrianism should be stopped.
3. Land should not be allotted to people who convert to Zoroastrianism
4. The Sasanian king should, in person, administer Armenia and not through deputies.

Following the treaty, Vahan Mamikonian was appointed as hazarapet and later marzban ("margrave") of Armenia. The Armenian cavalry led by Vahan supported Balash against the uprising of a pretender named Zarer (son or brother of Peroz).

== Sources ==
- Chaumont, M. L.; Schippmann, K. "Balāš". Encyclopaedia Iranica, Vol. III, Fasc. 6 (Online ed.). pp. 574–580.
- Frye, R. N. (1983). "The political history of Iran under the Sasanians". In Yarshater, Ehsan (ed.). The Cambridge History of Iran. Vol. 3(1): The Seleucid, Parthian and Sasanian Periods. Cambridge: Cambridge University Press. ISBN 0-521-20092-X.
