= Zarmihr Karen =

Iranian nobleman from the House of Karen

Zarmihr Karen (died 558) was an Iranian nobleman from the House of Karen, who served as the Sasanian governor of Zabulistan. He was the son of Sukhra.

== Sources ==
- Schindel, Nikolaus (2013). "KAWĀD I i. Reign". Encyclopaedia Iranica, Vol. XVI, Fasc. 2. pp. 136–141.
- Pourshariati, Parvaneh (2008). Decline and Fall of the Sasanian Empire: The Sasanian-Parthian Confederacy and the Arab Conquest of Iran. London and New York: I.B. Tauris. ISBN 978-1-84511-645-3.
