= Marzban =

Commanders of border provinces in the Parthian and Sasanian Empires

Marzbān, or Marzpān (Middle Persian: 𐭬𐭫𐭱𐭰𐭠𐭭𐭯 transliteration: mrzwpn, derived from Middle Persian: 𐭬𐭫𐭱 marz "border, boundary" and the Middle Persian suffix: 𐭡𐭭𐭯 -pān "guardian"; Modern Persian: مرزبان Marzbān) were a class of margraves, warden of the marches, and by extension military commanders, in charge of border provinces of the Parthian Empire (247 BC–224 AD) and mostly Sasanian Empire (224–651 AD) of Iran.

== Etymology ==
The Persian word marz is derived from Avestan marəza "frontier, border"; pān/pāvan is cognate with Avestan and Old Persian pat "protector". The word was borrowed from New Persian into Arabic as مرزبان marzubān (plural مرازبة marāziba). "Al-Marzubani" (المرزباني) has been used as a nisba (family title) for some Iranian families whose ancestor was a marzbān. The prominent Islamic scholar Abu Hanifa, whose formal name is given in Islamic sources as Nu'man ibn Thabit ibn Zuta ibn Marzubān (نعمان بن ثابت بن زوطا بن مرزبان), was descended from the marzbāns of Kabul, where his father came from. The Bavand (651–1349 AD) and Sallarid (919–1062 AD) dynasty rulers also used marzubān in their name.

The word marzban was borrowed into Armenian as marzpan (մարզպան) and into Georgian as marzapani (მარზაპანი).

== History ==
The ranks tradition (primarily of vāspuhrān and āzādān) can be traced to the Achaemenid Empire (550–330 BC), but due to lack of sources even in the Parthian Empire (247 BC – 224 AD) the existence of a proper classification of ranks is unknown, in comparison to the Sasanian royal inscriptions from the 3rd century AD when the aristocracy was divided into four or five ranks; šahrdārān (kings, landholders), vāspuhrān (princes; the seven great noble families), wuzurgān (magnates; "great ones"), lower nobility āzādān (feudal nobles; freemen), and kadag-xwadāy (householders). The Sasanian military organization was more sophisticated than the inherited Parthian system. The caste system wasn't rigid as in India, but the ruling officiers were mostly from wuzurgān caste. There's a possibility that the Late Sasanian marzbānān also originated from the āzādān, who mostly were lords of villages (dihqānān), supplied the cavalry with young riders (asbārān), or were bodyguards and security forces with titles bandagān, ayyārān or jānbāzān, all signifying association with the king.

The title marzbān can be dated to the Parthian Empire, where in the frontier areas such as Nisa (1st century BC) are found titles mrzwpn (marzban), probably an officier in charge of the frontier troops, and dyzpty, an officier in charge of a fort. Some scholars consider that marzbāns existed during the reign of Darius I (550–486 BC) of the Achaemenid Empire. There is some uncertainty for the exact relationship between titles marzbān, spāhbed, kanārang, pāygōsbān (Parthian ptykwspn, Sasanian paygospān or padhospān) and ostāndār. The historical sources blur the distinction between the marzbān and spāhbed (army general or military governor), implying marzbān was a military title strictly limited to the frontier marches and provinces. The least clear is the distinction with kanārang, apparently an East-Iranian derivation of marzbān in the province Abarshahr in Central Asia. The pāygōsbān, meaning "guardian of the district", is an uncertain title, seemingly provincial military commanders or governors, while the marzbān meant "guardian of the borders, provinces". Perhaps the pāygōsbān lacked civilian duties. The ostāndār was the governor of an ostān (province or district within a province).

The primary sources imply the marzbān was a provincional function practiced for a single or multiple provinces, but there is no evidence for a "quarter of the empire", as al-Masudi entitled Šahrwarāz (629 AD). The rank of marzbān, like most imperial administration, was mostly patrimonial, and was passed down through a single family for generations. The marzbāns of greatest seniority were permitted a silver throne, while marzbāns of the most strategic border provinces, such as the province of Armenia, were allowed a golden throne. In military campaigns the regional marzbāns could be regarded as field marshals, while lesser spāhbeds could command a field army.

The function of marzbān changed over the years, with smaller territorial units being part of the civil administration. In the early years the main marzbān regions were Iberia, Armenia, Beth Aramaye, Pars, Kirman, Spahan, Adurbadagan, Tabaristan, Nishapur, Tus, Sakastan, Mazun, Harev, Marv and Sarakhs, several mentioned belonging to the Greater Khorasan. Some regions enjoyed considerable autonomy while other were militarily more important, for example the Adurbadagan facing the Caucasus was special military frontier.

Marzbāns were granted the administration of the border provinces and were responsible for maintaining the security of the trade routes, fighting the encroaching nomadic tribes such as Bedouin Arabs, White Huns and Oghuz Turks, and holding the first line of defense against settled enemies such as Romans and Kushans. During the reign of Khosrow I (531–579 AD) were held military reforms by which were created four frontier regions (Khwarasan, Khwarwaran, Nemroz, Adurbadagan) with spāhbed in charge, sometimes still called as marzbān, but now generally considered for more central provinces. Also, the previous gentry rank dihqānān was moulded into influential "nobility of service" which became the backbone of the Sasanian state. However, this measures of centralization caused the transfer of the power to the military (the dihqānān gradually became more independent from the government, while the four large spāhbed territories quasi-independent fiefs), and led to the eventual disintegration of the Empire.

The Sasanian social, administrative and military structure and system was inherited by the Medieval Islamic civilization, however, the marzbāns steadily disappeared depending on the region, as such in Iraq diminished and were replaced by Muslim frontier warriors muqātila, while in Khorasan still had special privileges. In generally were replaced by the title dihqānān.

== See also ==
- Muḥammad ibn al-Marzubani (ca.910–994)
- List of marzbans
- Marzpanate Armenia
- Satrap, the governor of the provinces
- Spahbed, a similar Sassanid commandership rank
- Ban, a noble title which was used in various South European Balkan countries
- List of Iranian titles and ranks
- Military of the Sasanian Empire

== Bibliography ==
- Frye, Richard N (1984), The History of Ancient Iran, C.H.Beck, ISBN 978-3-406-09397-5
- Zakeri, Mohsen (1995), Sasanid Soldiers in Early Muslim Society: The Origins of 'Ayyārān and Futuwwa, Otto Harrassowitz Verlag, ISBN 978-3-447-03652-8
- Nicolle, David (1996), Sassanian Armies: the Iranian Empire Early 3rd to Mid-7th Centuries AD, Stockport: Montvert, ISBN 978-1-874101-08-6
- Wiesehöfer, Josef (2001), Ancient Persia, I.B. Tauris, ISBN 978-1-86064-675-1
- Pourshariati, Parvaneh (2008), Decline and fall of the Sasanian empire: the Sasanian-Parthian confederacy and the Arab conquest of Iran, I.B. Tauris in association with the Iran Heritage Foundation, ISBN 978-1-84511-645-3
- Hoyland, Robert G. (2011), Theophilus of Edessa's Chronicle and the Circulation of Historical Knowledge in Late Antiquity and Early Islam, Liverpool University Press, ISBN 978-1-84631-697-5
- Farrokh, Kaveh; McBride, Angus (2012), Sassanian Elite Cavalry AD 224-642, Osprey Publishing, ISBN 978-1-78200-848-4, archived from the original on 2016-03-04
- Briant, Pierre (2015), Darius in the Shadow of Alexander, Harvard University Press, ISBN 978-0-674-74520-9
- Gyselen, Rika (20 July 2004). "Spāhbed". Encyclopaedia Iranica, Online Edition.
