= Sukhra's Hephthalite campaign =

484 military campaign

- Part of Hephthalite–Persian Wars
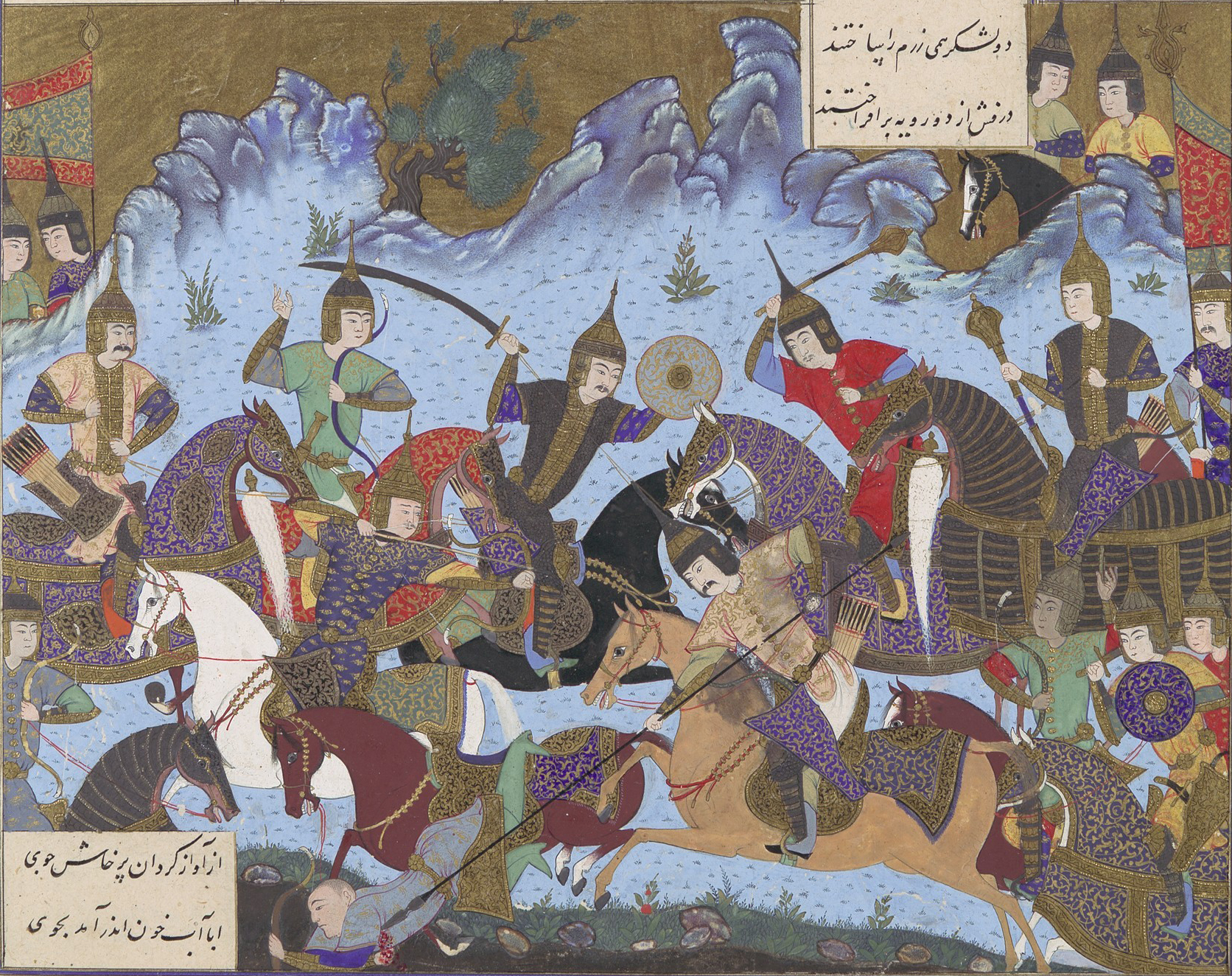
- Sukhra fighting the Hephthalites in the Shahnameh.
Date	484
Location	Near Gorgan (?)
Result	Sasanian victory

Belligerents
Hephthalite Empire	Sasanian Empire

Commanders and leaders
Khushnavaz	Sukhra

Sukhra's Hephthalite campaign took place in 484 between the Hephthalites and the Sasanian Empire.

== History ==
In 484, the Sasanian king Peroz I suffered a major defeat to the Hephthalites and was killed at the battle of Herat. The Karenid noble Sukhra then set out to avenge his death, and took the majority of the Sasanian army with him; when he reached Gorgan, the Hephthalite king Khushnavaz got informed of his plan to attack him and quickly prepared his men for war. He then sent a message to Sukhra "asking him about his intentions and enquiring what his name and his official position were." Sukhra shortly sent a message back to Khushnavaz, informing him about his name and position. Khushnavaz thereafter sent another message, warning him of doing the same mistake as Peroz I.

However, his words did not discourage Sukhra, who then marched against Khushnavaz, and inflicted a heavy defeat on his men. Khushnavaz thereafter sued for peace, which Sukhra would only accept if he would give him everything Khushnavaz had seized from Peroz I's camp, which included his treasuries, the chief priest (mowbed) of the empire, and his daughter Perozdukht. Khushnavaz accepted his demands, and peace was made.

== Sources ==
- Schindel, Nikolaus (2013). "KAWĀD I i. Reign". Encyclopaedia Iranica, Vol. XVI, Fasc. 2. pp. 136–141.
- Pourshariati, Parvaneh (2008). Decline and Fall of the Sasanian Empire: The Sasanian-Parthian Confederacy and the Arab Conquest of Iran. London and New York: I.B. Tauris. ISBN 978-1-84511-645-3.
- Al-Tabari, Abu Ja'far Muhammad ibn Jarir (1985–2007). Ehsan Yar-Shater (ed.). The History of Al-Ṭabarī. Vol. 40 vols. Albany, NY: State University of New York Press.
- Rezakhani, Khodadad (2017). ReOrienting the Sasanians: East Iran in Late Antiquity. Edinburgh University Press. pp. 1–256. ISBN 9781474400305.
