= Jamasp =

Shahanshah of the Sasanian Empire from 496 to 498/9

- King of Kings of Iranians and non-Iranians
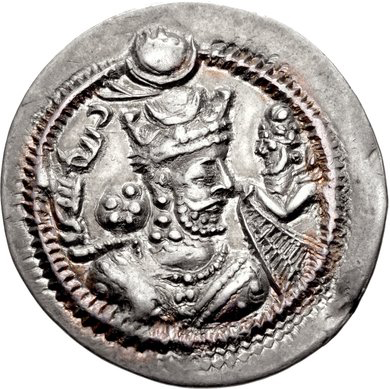
- Drachma of Jamasp, Susa mint

Shahanshah of the Sasanian Empire
- Reign: 496–498/9
- Predecessor: Kavad I
- Successor: Kavad I (restored)
- Died: 530/540
- Issue: Narsi
- House: House of Sasan
- Father: Peroz I
- Religion: Zoroastrianism

Jamasp (also spelled Zamasp or Djamasp; Middle Persian: 𐭩𐭠𐭬𐭠𐭮𐭯; Persian: جاماسپ Jāmāsp) was Sasanian King of Kings of Iran from 496 to 498/9. He was a son of Peroz I and younger brother of Kavad I. Jamasp was installed on the Sasanian throne upon the deposition of the latter by the nobility and clergy. Jamasp's mother's name is unknown.

== Name ==
Due to increased Sasanian interest in Kayanian history, Jamasp was named after Jamasp, the mythological minister of the Kayanian monarch Vishtaspa. The name is transliterated in Greek as Zamásphēs; Arabic Jāmāsb, Zāmāsb, and Zāmāsf; New Persian Jāmāsp and Zāmāsp.

== Background ==
In 484, Peroz I (r. 459–484) was defeated and killed by a Hephthalite (Note: The Hephthalites were a tribal group that was most prominent of the "Iranian Huns". In the second half of the 5th-century, they controlled Tukharistan and also seemingly chunks of southern Transoxiana.) army near Balkh. His army was completely destroyed, and his body was never found. Four of his sons and brothers had also died. The main Sasanian cities of the eastern region of Khorasan−Nishapur, Herat and Marw were now under Hephthalite rule. Sukhra, a member of the Parthian House of Karen, one of the Seven Great Houses of Iran, quickly raised a new force and stopped the Hephthalites from achieving further success. Peroz' brother, Balash, was elected as shah by the Iranian magnates, most notably Sukhra and the Mihranid general Shapur Mihran. However, Balash proved unpopular among the nobility and clergy who had him deposed after just four years in 488. Sukhra, who had played a key role in Balash's deposition, appointed Kavad I as the new shah of Iran.

== Reign ==
In 496, due to the socioeconomic and religious changes implemented by Kavad I, the nobility and Zoroastrian clergy had him deposed. They installed his more impressionable brother Jamasp on the throne. One of the other reasons behind Kavad's deposal was his execution of Sukhra. Meanwhile, chaos was occurring in the country, notably in Mesopotamia. A council soon took place among the nobility to discuss what to do with Kavad. Gushnaspdad, a member of a prominent family of landowners (the Kanarangiyan) proposed that Kavad be executed. His suggestion was overruled, however, and Kavad was imprisoned instead in the Prison of Oblivion in Khuzestan. However, Kavad managed to escape and flee to the domains of the Hephthalites.

In 498 (or 499), Kavad returned to Iran with a Hephthalite army. When he crossed the domains of the Kanarangiyan family in Khorasan, he was met by Adergoudounbades, a member of the family, who agreed to help him. Another noble who supported Kavad was Zarmihr Karen, a son of Sukhra. Jamasp and the nobility and clergy did not resist as they wanted to prevent another civil war. They came to an agreement with Kavad that he would be shah again with the understanding that he would not hurt Jamasp or the elite. Jamasp was spared, albeit probably blinded, while Gushnaspdad and other nobles who had plotted against Kavad were executed. Kavad's reclamation of his throne displays the troubled circumstances of the empire, where in a time of anarchy a small force was able to overwhelm the nobility-clergy alliance.

Jamasp then went to Armenia, where he defeated the Khazars, conquered some of their territory, and married a woman from Armenia, who bore him a son named Narsi.

== Descendants ==
After Jamasp's death in 530/540, his son Narsi, who had a son named Piruz, expanded the domains of his family, which included Gilan. He then married one of the princesses of Gilan, who bore him a son Gilanshah. The latter had a son named Gil Gavbara, who later started the Dabuyid dynasty, and had two sons named Dabuya and Paduspan. His son Dabuya succeeded him as ispahbadh of the Dabuyid dynasty, while his other son, Paduspan, founded the Paduspanid dynasty.

== Sources ==
- Axworthy, Michael (2008). A History of Iran: Empire of the Mind. New York: Basic Books. pp. 1–368. ISBN 978-0-465-00888-9.
- Boyce, Mary (2001). Zoroastrians: Their Religious Beliefs and Practices. Psychology Press. pp. 1–252. ISBN 9780415239028.
- Chaumont, M. L.; Schippmann, K. (1988). "Balāš, Sasanian king of kings". Encyclopaedia Iranica, Vol. III, Fasc. 6. pp. 574–580.
- Choksy, Jamsheed K. (2008). "Jāmāsp i. Reign". Encyclopaedia Iranica, Vol. XIV, Fasc. 5. pp. 453–454.
- Daryaee, Touraj (2014). Sasanian Persia: The Rise and Fall of an Empire. I.B.Tauris. pp. 1–240. ISBN 978-0857716668.
- Daryaee, Touraj; Rezakhani, Khodadad (2017). "The Sasanian Empire". In Daryaee, Touraj (ed.). King of the Seven Climes: A History of the Ancient Iranian World (3000 BCE - 651 CE). UCI Jordan Center for Persian Studies. pp. 1–236. ISBN 9780692864401.
- Madelung, Wilferd (1993). "Dabuyids". In Yarshater, Ehsan (ed.). Encyclopaedia Iranica, Vol. VI, Fasc. 5. London et al.: Routledge & Kegan Paul. pp. 541–544. ISBN 1-56859-007-5.
- McDonough, Scott (2011). "The Legs of the Throne: Kings, Elites, and Subjects in Sasanian Iran". In Arnason, Johann P.; Raaflaub, Kurt A. (eds.). The Roman Empire in Context: Historical and Comparative Perspectives. John Wiley & Sons, Ltd. pp. 290–321. doi:10.1002/9781444390186.ch13. ISBN 9781444390186.
- Payne, Richard (2015). "The Reinvention of Iran: The Sasanian Empire and the Huns". In Maas, Michael (ed.). The Cambridge Companion to the Age of Attila. Cambridge University Press. pp. 282–299. ISBN 978-1-107-63388-9.
- Potts, Daniel T. (2018). "Sasanian Iran and its northeastern frontier". In Mass, Michael; Di Cosmo, Nicola (eds.). Empires and Exchanges in Eurasian Late Antiquity. Cambridge University Press. pp. 1–538. ISBN 9781316146040.
- Pourshariati, Parvaneh (2008). Decline and Fall of the Sasanian Empire: The Sasanian-Parthian Confederacy and the Arab Conquest of Iran. London and New York: I.B. Tauris. ISBN 978-1-84511-645-3.
- Rezakhani, Khodadad (2017). ReOrienting the Sasanians: East Iran in Late Antiquity. Edinburgh University Press. pp. 1–256. ISBN 9781474400305.
- Schindel, Nikolaus (2013). "Kawād I i. Reign". Encyclopaedia Iranica, Vol. XVI, Fasc. 2. pp. 136–141.
- Shahbazi, A. Shapur (2005). "Sasanian dynasty". Encyclopaedia Iranica, Online Edition.

Jamasp Sasanian dynasty
Preceded by Kavad I	King of kings of Iran and non-Iran; 496–498/9	Succeeded by Kavad I (restored)
