= Amemar bar Mar Yanuka =

Babylonian rabbi (died 470)

Amemar bar Mar Yanuḳa (Hebrew: אמימר בר מר ינוקא; also Yanḳa, ינקא) was a Babylonian rabbi (amora) of the fifth and sixth amoraic generations, who, together with the exilarch (Resh Galuta) Huna Mar II. and Mesharsheya bar Pakod, first suffered martyrdom in the cause of Judaism on Babylonian soil – victims of the persecutions inaugurated by King Firuz.

Amemar was executed in the month of Adar 470, two months after the execution of his fellow martyrs.
