= Hephthalite–Sasanian Wars =

Series of conflicts between Hephthalite and Sasanian empires

Sasanian–Hephthalite Wars
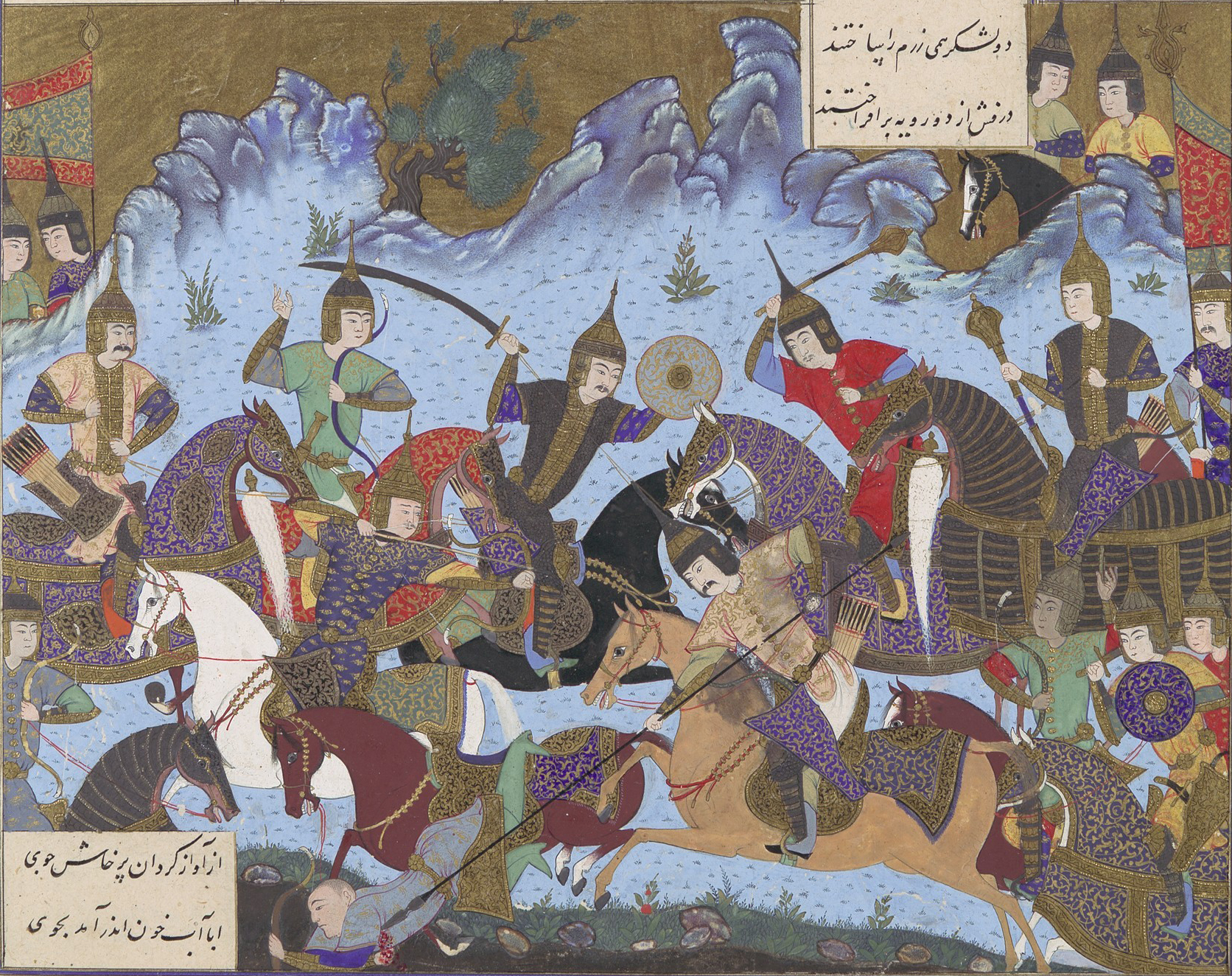
- Sasanian and Hephthalite forces in battle. Shahnama (Book of Kings) of Shah Tahmasp, ca. 1530–35
Date	5th century – 7th century
Location	Greater Khorasan, Transoxiana, Central Asia (modern-day Uzbekistan)
Result	Sasanian victory: Collapse of the Hephthalite empire

Belligerents
Sasanian Empire; Western Turkic Khaganate	Hephthalite Empire

Commanders and leaders
Bahram V Peroz I †; Jamasp; Mihran †; Sukhra; Kavad I Khosrow I Istemi Khagan	Khushnavaz; Ghaftar

The Hephthalite–Sasanian Wars were a series of conflicts between the White Huns and the Persian Empire. The most significant of these occurred in 484 with the death of Shah Peroz I at the hands of the Hephthalites.

The Sasanian empire, while being one of the strongest continental powers in its region, suffered from a relative weakness of its eastern frontier, which was bordered by steppes where various pastoral nomadic peoples lived. The Hunnic dynasty of Hephthalites was one of such nomadic empires formed in the 5th century in the steppes of the eastern borderlands of Persia. The Sassanid Shahs fought a series of wars against Hephthalites, most notably Bahram V and Peroz I. However, these efforts led to a catastrophic defeat of Persians in 484 when Peroz I was killed during one of his invasions, resulting in Persians paying a large tribute to the Hephthalites and the Sasanian empire effectively becoming the Hephthalite satellite for next 50 years. Shah Kavad I was only able to ascend to the Persian throne with the Hephthalite support. Only under Khosrow I was the Persian empire eventually able to liberate itself from the Hephthalite influence, as the emerging Turkic peoples in the 550s threatened the Hephthalite interests from the east, which eventually led to the joint attack on Hephthalites by Persians and Turks in 563 (or 557). However, for Persia, the defeat of Hephthalites only substituted one nomadic neighbor with another, and arguably much more powerful one.

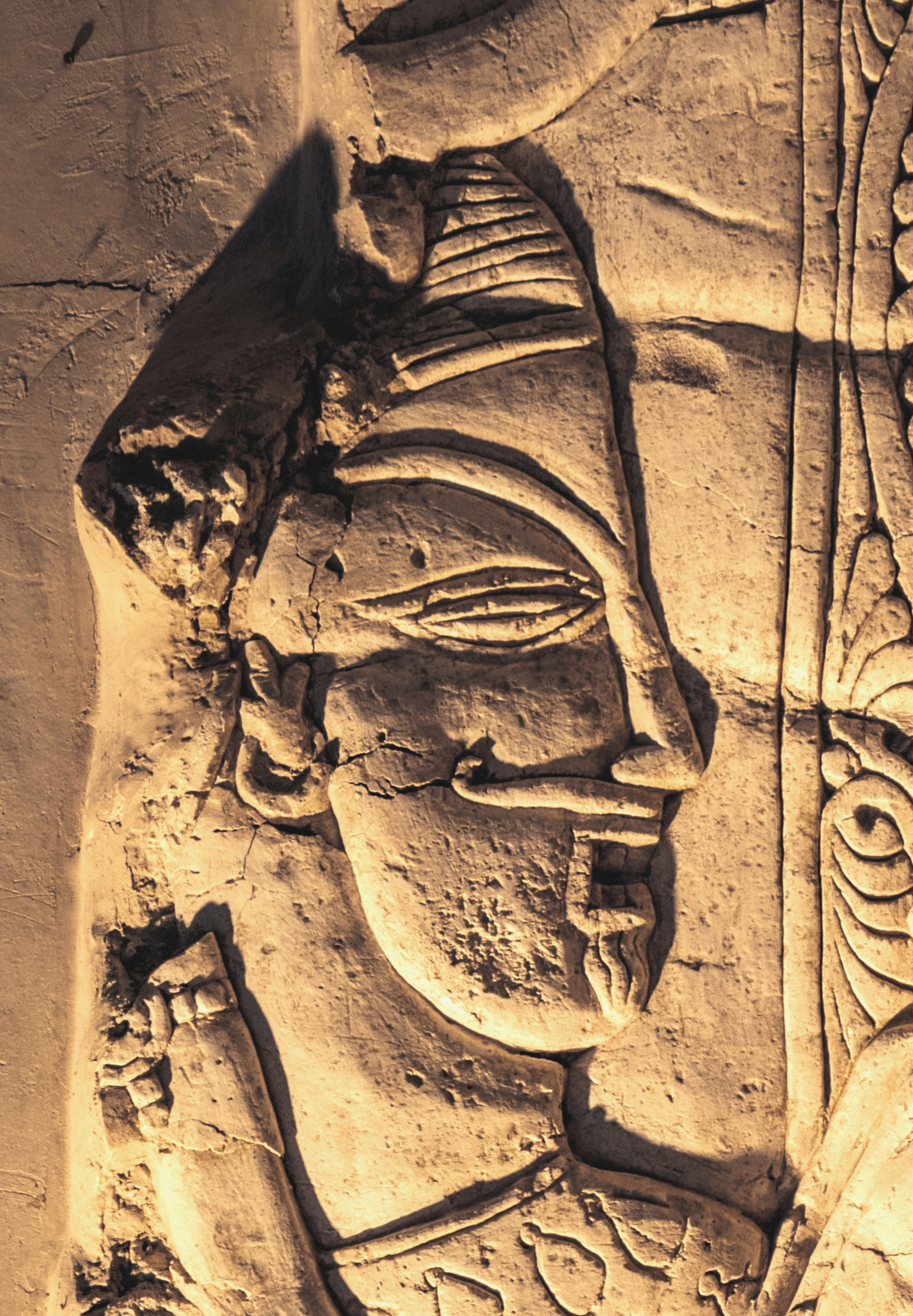
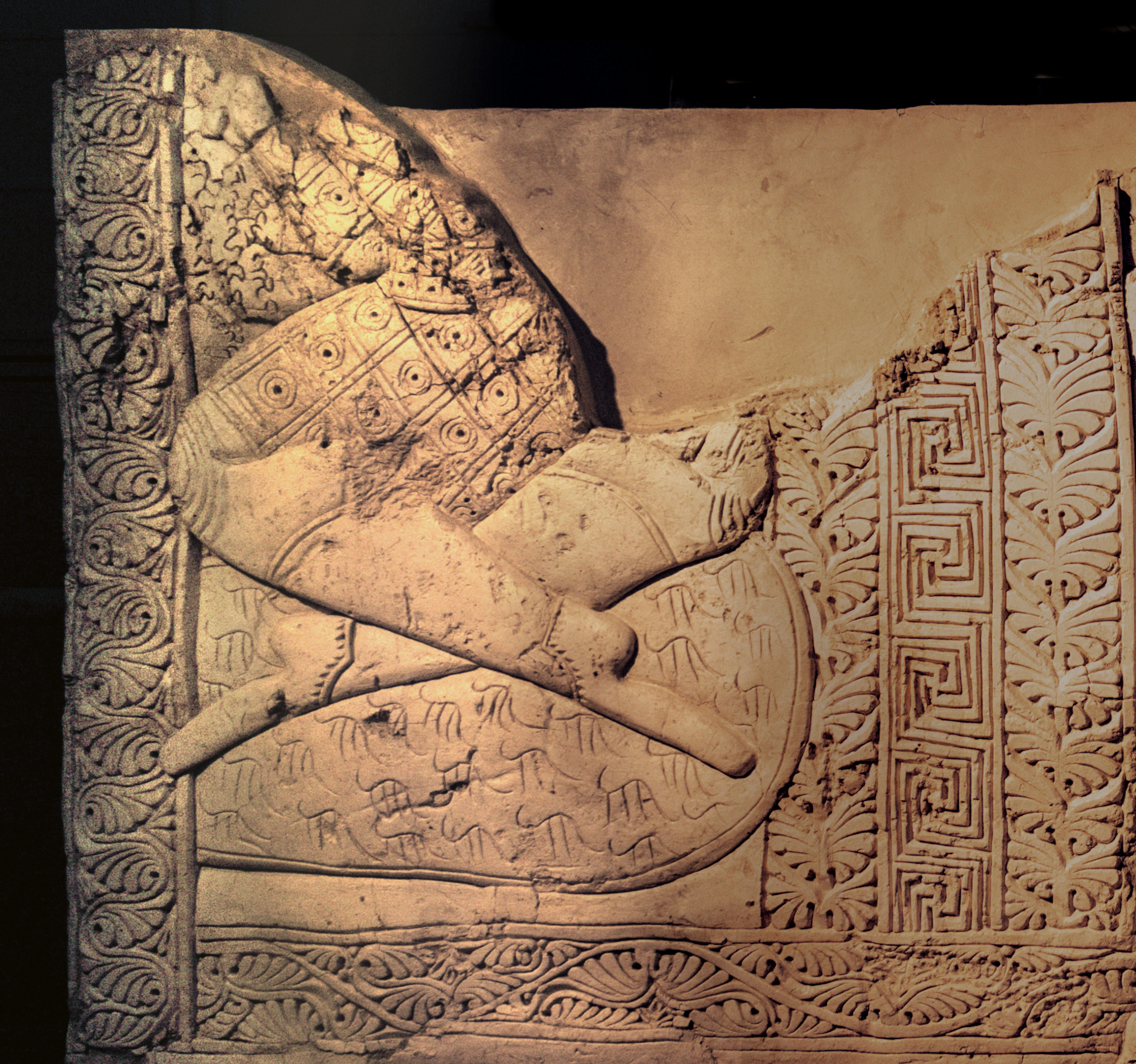
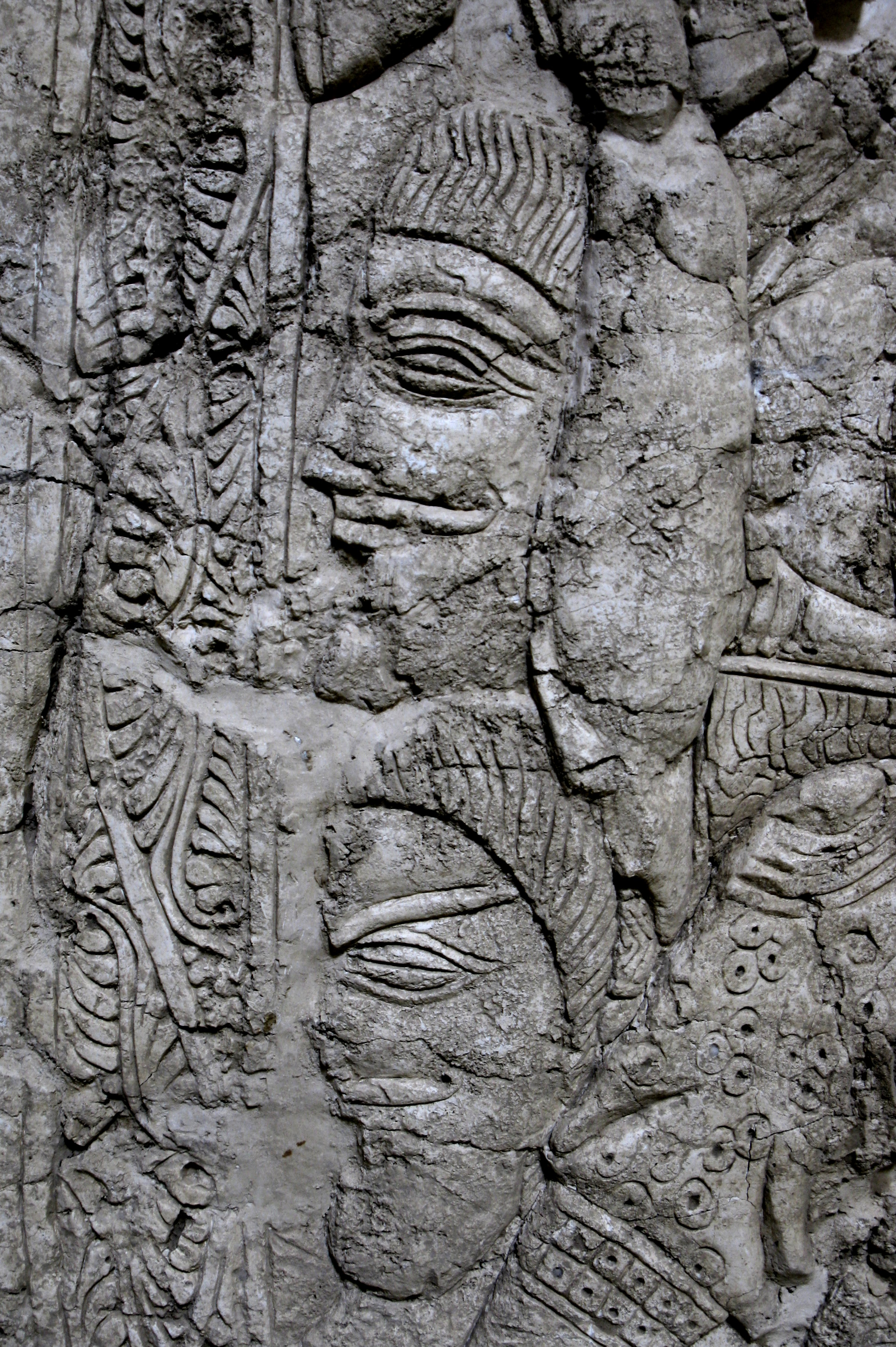
The Hephthalites as vanquished enemies (face down on the floor), and then as allies (seated), in the Sasanian Bandian complex. The inscription next to the seated ruler reads: "I am Hephthalite, son … the Hephthalite is trustworthy". 459-497 CE

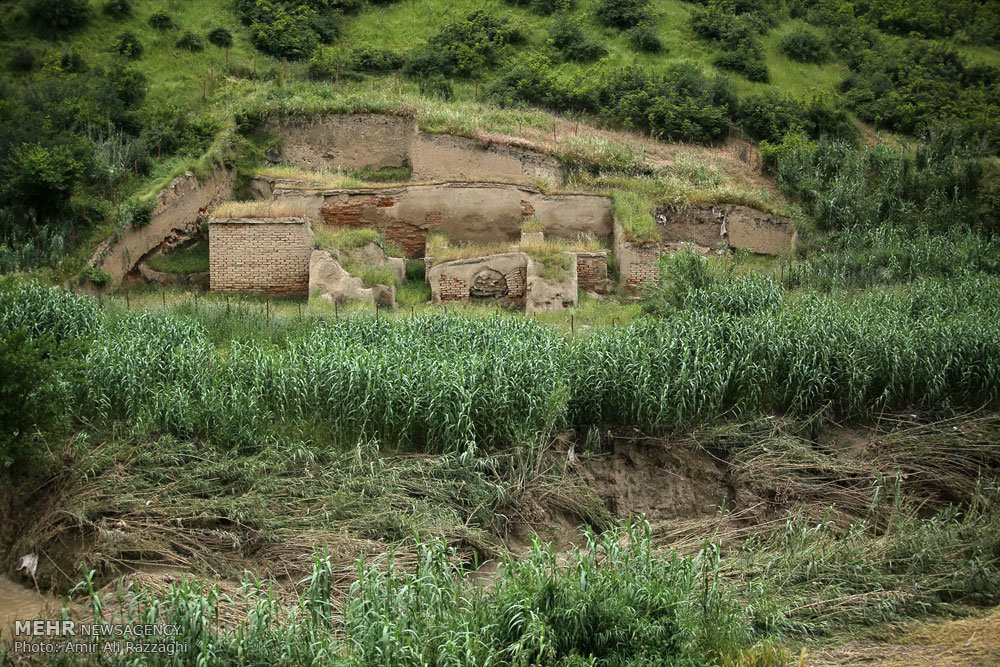
Part of the Sasanian defensive lines against the Huns in northern Persia

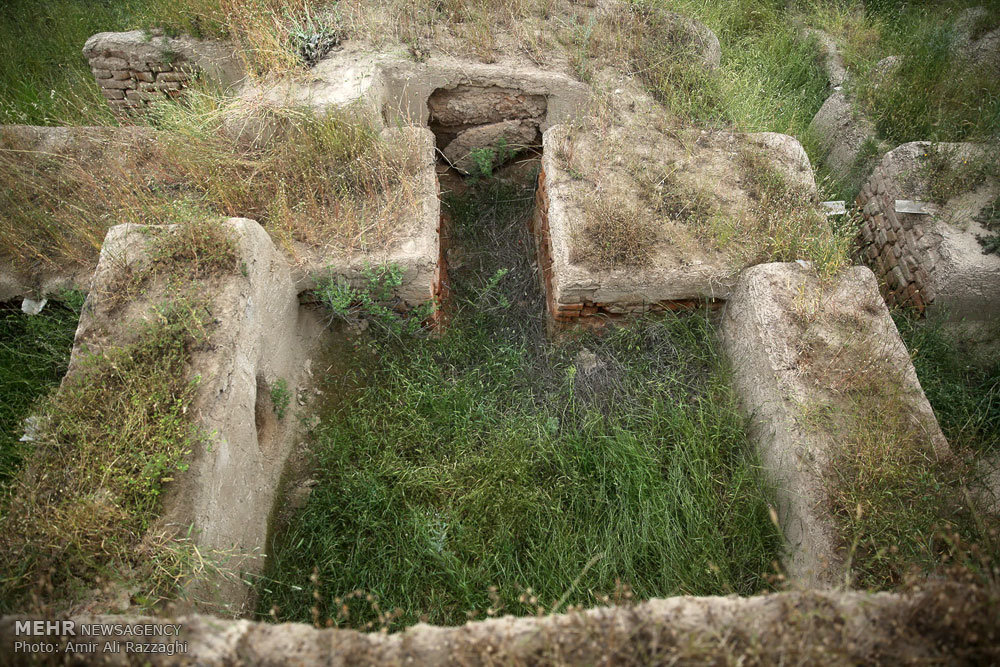
Great Wall of Gorgan – 200 kilometers long

== See also ==
- Great Wall of Gorgan, a defense system created to prevent further Hephthalite incursions
- Bandian Fire Temple
- Sasanian–Kidarite wars

== Sources ==
- Daryaee, Touraj (2014). Sasanian Persia: The Rise and Fall of an Empire. I.B.Tauris. pp. 1–240. ISBN 978-0857716668.
- Payne, Richard (2015b). "The Reinvention of Iran: The Sasanian Empire and the Huns". In Maas, Michael (ed.). The Cambridge Companion to the Age of Attila. Cambridge University Press. pp. 282–299. ISBN 978-1-107-63388-9.
- Rezakhani, Khodadad (2017). "East Iran in Late Antiquity". ReOrienting the Sasanians: East Iran in Late Antiquity. Edinburgh University Press. pp. 1–256. ISBN 9781474400305. JSTOR 10.3366/j.ctt1g04zr8. (registration required)
- Pourshariati, Parvaneh (2008). Decline and Fall of the Sasanian Empire: The Sasanian-Parthian Confederacy and the Arab Conquest of Iran. London and New York: I.B. Tauris. ISBN 978-1-84511-645-3.
- Vogelsang, W. J. (2003). "HERAT ii. HISTORY, PRE-ISLAMIC PERIOD". Encyclopaedia Iranica, Vol. XII, Fasc. 2. pp. 205–206.
- Schindel, Nikolaus (2013). "KAWĀD I i. Reign". Encyclopaedia Iranica, Vol. XVI, Fasc. 2. pp. 136–141.
- Fisher, William Bayne; Yarshater, Ehsan (1983). The Cambridge History of Iran: The Seleucid, Parthian and Sasanian periods. Cambridge University Press. ISBN 978-0-521-24693-4.
- Potts, Daniel T. (2014). Nomadism in Iran: From Antiquity to the Modern Era. London and New York: Oxford University Press. pp. 1–558. ISBN 9780199330799.
- Greatrex, Geoffrey; Lieu, Samuel N. C. (2002). The Roman Eastern Frontier and the Persian Wars (Part II, 363–630 AD). New York, New York and London, United Kingdom: Routledge (Taylor & Francis). ISBN 0-415-14687-9.
- Morony, M. (1986). "ʿARAB ii. Arab conquest of Iran". Encyclopaedia Iranica, Vol. II, Fasc. 2. pp. 203–210.
- Howard-Johnston, James (2021). The Last Great War of Antiquity. Oxford University Press. ISBN 9780198830191.
- Maas, Michael (2015). The Cambridge Companion to the Age of Attila. Cambridge University Press. ISBN 978-1-107-02175-4.
