= Zarmihr Hazarwuxt =

Zarmihr Hazarwuxt was an Iranian military leader from the House of Karen, who served as the marzban of Sasanian Armenia briefly in 483.

== Biography ==
In 458, a Mamikonian princess, Sushanik, was murdered by her husband the Mihranid prince Varsken, who was a convert to Zoroastrianism. The reason for her murder was because she refused to convert and wanted to stay Christian. Varsken was then executed by Vakhtang I, king of Iberia. After hearing about the execution, Peroz I sent an army under commander Shapur Mihran to punish Vakhtang for intervening. However, Vakhtang was joined by the Armenians, and a revolt broke out in Persian Armenia, led by Vahan I Mamikonian.

Peroz I then sent another commander named Zarmihr Hazarwuxt, who laid siege to Dvin. Zarmihr, was however, defeated and only stayed in Persian Armenia during a short time until he set out to defeat the forces of Vakhtang I.

After hearing about the death of Peroz I during his war against the Hephthalites, Zarmihr left Iberia and returned to his son Sukhra in Ctesiphon, to protect the Sasanian Empire from the Hephthalites and to elect a new king. Balash, the brother of Peroz I, was crowned as the new king of the Sasanian Empire. However, it was in reality the son of Zarmihr, Sukhra who exercised real power over the Sasanian Empire. Zarmihr is thereafter no longer mentioned.

== Sources ==
- Schindel, Nikolaus (2013). "KAWĀD I i. Reign". Encyclopaedia Iranica, Vol. XVI, Fasc. 2. pp. 136–141.
- Pourshariati, Parvaneh (2008). Decline and Fall of the Sasanian Empire: The Sasanian-Parthian Confederacy and the Arab Conquest of Iran. London and New York: I.B. Tauris. ISBN 978-1-84511-645-3.
- Basmadjian, Krikor Jacob (1914). "Chronologie de l'histoire d'Arménie". Revue de l'Orient chrétien (in French). IX (XIX): 293–294.
- Grousset, René (1947). Histoire de l'Arménie des origines à 1071 (in French). Paris: Payot.
- Toumanoff, Cyrille (1990). "Vice-rois iraniens (Marzpans) d'Arménie". Les dynasties de la Caucasie chrétienne de l'Antiquité jusqu'au xixe siècle : Tables généalogiques et chronologiques (in French). Rome. pp. 506–507.
- Settipani, Christian (2006). Continuité des élites à Byzance durant les siècles obscurs. Les princes caucasiens et l'Empire du vie au ixe siècle (in French). Paris: de Boccard. ISBN 978-2-7018-0226-8.
- Dédéyan, Gérard (2007). Histoire du peuple arménien (in French). Toulouse: Éd. Privat. ISBN 978-2-7089-6874-5.

Preceded by Vahan I Mamikonian	Marzban of Persian Armenia; 483	Succeeded by Shapur of Ray
