= Sukhra =

Iranian nobleman (died 493)

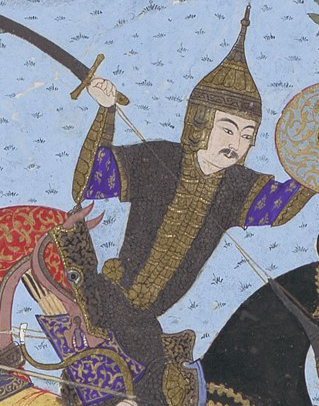
- Sukhra in the Shahnameh.
- Born: 5th-century Shiraz, Ardashir-Khwarrah, Pars
- Died: 493; Ctesiphon, Asoristan
- Military career
- Allegiance: Sasanian Empire
- Conflicts: Hephthalite–Persian Wars

Sukhra (also spelled Sufaray, Sufray, Surkhab, Sarafra'i) was an Iranian nobleman from the House of Karen, who was the de facto ruler of the Sasanian Empire from 484 to 493. He was active during the reign of shah Peroz I (r. 457-484), Balash (r. 484 – 488) and Kavad I (r. 488-496). He is often confused with his father Zarmihr Hazarwuxt and son Zarmihr Karen.

He first appears in 484, when Peroz I appoints him as the minister (wuzurg framadār) of the empire. Peroz I was defeated and killed the same year during a campaign against the Hephthalite Empire, which seized much of the empire's eastern territory. Sukhra then avenged Peroz I by invading Hephthalite territory and inflicting a major defeat on them.

When he returned from his campaign, he was praised by the Sasanian nobles, and Balash was elected as king. However, it was in reality Sukhra that had control over the empire. In 488, Sukhra had Balash deposed and installed Peroz I's son Kavad I as the new king. However, Sukhra still remained the power behind the throne. In 493, Kavad I had Sukhra exiled to Shiraz in order to minimize his power. Fearful of rebellion, Kavad I asked for the assistance of Shapur of Ray, who defeated Sukhra's loyalists, and had him captured and sent to Ctesiphon, where he was executed.

== Biography ==
=== The death of Peroz I and the reign of Balash ===
Sukhra was born in Shiraz in the administrative division of Ardashir-Khwarrah in Pars—he was the son of Zarmihr Hazarwuxt, a Sasanian commander who was active in Armenia. In 484, Peroz I, before invading the territory of the Hephthalite Empire, had his brother Balash installed as viceroy, and Sukhra appointed as his minister. Peroz I, however, suffered a major defeat to the Hephthalites and was killed at the battle of Herat. According to al-Tabari, Sukhra was the governor of Sakastan before his appointment as minister.

Sukhra then set out to avenge his death, and took the majority of the Sasanian army with him; when he reached Gorgan, the Hephthalite king Khushnavaz got informed of his plan to attack him, and quickly prepared his men for war. He then sent a message to Sukhra "asking him about his intentions and enquiring what his name and his official position were." Sukhra shortly sent a message back to Khushnavaz, informing him about his name and position. Khushnavaz thereafter sent another message, warning him of doing the same mistake as Peroz I.

However, his words did not discourage Sukhra, who then marched against Khushnavaz, and inflicted a heavy defeat on his men. Khushnavaz thereafter sued for peace, which Sukhra would only accept if he would give him everything Khushnavaz had seized from Peroz I's camp, which included his treasuries, the chief priest (mowbed) of the empire, and his daughter Perozdukht. Khushnavaz accepted his demands, and peace was made.

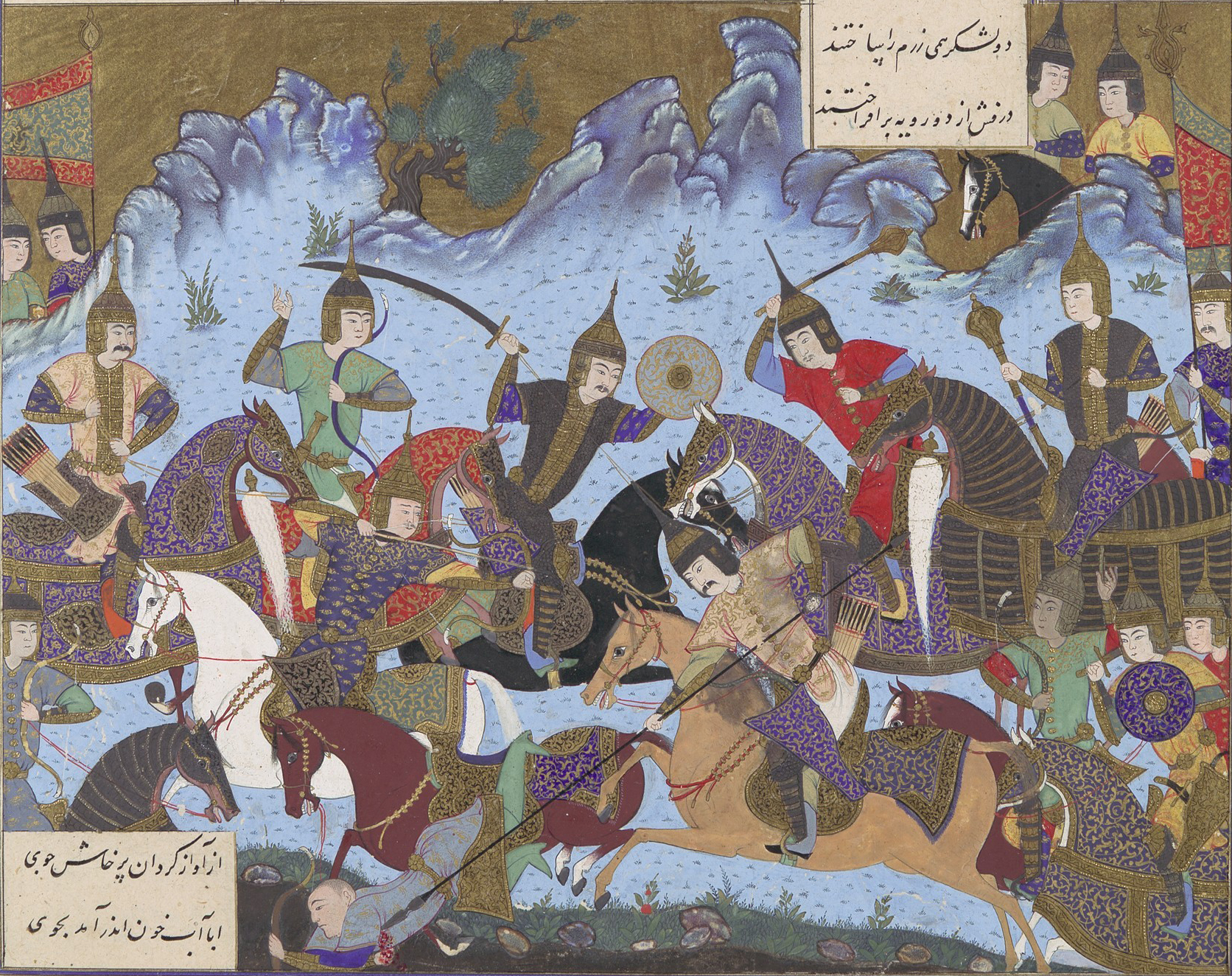
Sukhra fighting the Hephthalites in the Shahnameh.

After his victory, he returned to the Sasanian capital of Ctesiphon, where the nobles "received him with great honor, extolled his feats, and raised him to a lofty status such as none but kings were able to attain after him" Balash was thereafter crowned as the new king of the empire. However, he proved unpopular among the nobility and clergy who had him deposed after just four years in 488. Sukhra, who had played a key role in Balash's deposition, appointed Peroz I's young son Kavad I as the new shah of Iran. According to Miskawayh (d. 1030), Sukhra was Kavad's maternal uncle.

=== Reign of Kavad I and Sukhra's fall from power and death ===
Even after the ascension of a new Sasanian king, Sukhra still possessed a massive amount of power. The young and inexperienced Kavad was tutored by Sukhra during his first five years as shah. During this period, Kavad was a mere figurehead, whilst Sukhra was the de facto ruler of the empire. This is emphasized by al-Tabari, who states that Sukhra "was in charge of government of the kingdom and the management of affairs ... [T]he people came to Sukhra and undertook all their dealings with him, treating Kavad as a person of no importance and regarding his commands with contempt." Numerous regions and the representatives of the elite paid tribute to Sukhra not to Kavad. Sukhra controlled the royal treasury and the Iranian military. In 493, Kavad, having reached adulthood, wanted to put an end to Sukhra's dominance, and had him exiled to his native Shiraz in southwestern Iran. Even in exile, however, Sukhra was in control of everything except the kingly crown. He bragged about having put Kavad on the throne.

Alarmed by the thought that Sukhra might rebel, Kavad wanted to get rid of him completely. He lacked the manpower to do so, however, as the army was controlled by Sukhra and the Sasanians relied mainly on the military of the Seven Great Houses of Iran. He found his solution in Shapur of Ray, a powerful nobleman from the House of Mihran, and a resolute opponent of Sukhra. Shapur, at the head of an army of his own men and disgruntled nobles, marched to Shiraz, defeated Sukhra's forces, and imprisoned him in Ctesiphon. Even in prison, Sukhra was considered too powerful and was executed. This caused displeasure among some prominent members of the nobility weakening Kavad's status as shah.

== Legacy ==
Even after Sukhra's death, his family still possessed much power within the Sasanian Empire. His son, Zarmihr Karen, helped Kavad in 488 to reclaim the Sasanian throne from his younger brother Djamasp. In the same year, one of Sukhra's other sons, Bozorgmehr, was appointed as the minister of the empire, and continued serve under the office during the reign of Kavad's successor, Khosrow I (r. 531–579). He thereafter served as spahbed under Khosrow I's successor Hormizd IV. Zarmihr Karen, along with Sukhra's other son Karin, aided Khosrow I in his war against the Turks. As a reward for their aid, Zarmihr Karen was rewarded with land in Zabulistan, while Karin was rewarded with land in Tabaristan, thus starting the Qarinvand dynasty, which ruled until the 11th-century.

Sukhra's son Simah-i Burzin served as the spahbed of the kust of Khorasan during the reign of Khosrow I. A descendant of Sukhra, Burzin Shah, was the governor of Nishapur during the reign of Yazdegerd III (r. 632–651).

== Sources ==
- Bosworth, C. E., ed. (1999). The History of al-Ṭabarī, Volume V: The Sāsānids, the Byzantines, the Lakhmids, and Yemen. SUNY Series in Near Eastern Studies. Albany, New York: State University of New York Press. ISBN 978-0-7914-4355-2.
- Chaumont, M. L.; Schippmann, K. (1988). "Balāš, Sasanian king of kings". Encyclopaedia Iranica, Vol. III, Fasc. 6. pp. 574–580.
- Frye, R. N. (1983). "The political history of Iran under the Sasanians". In Yarshater, Ehsan (ed.). The Cambridge History of Iran: The Seleucid, Parthian and Sasanian Periods. Vol. 3(1). Cambridge: Cambridge University Press. ISBN 0-521-20092-X.
- Schindel, Nikolaus (2013). "KAWĀD I i. Reign". Encyclopaedia Iranica, Vol. XVI, Fasc. 2. pp. 136–141.
- Pourshariati, Parvaneh (2008). Decline and Fall of the Sasanian Empire: The Sasanian-Parthian Confederacy and the Arab Conquest of Iran. London and New York: I.B. Tauris. ISBN 978-1-84511-645-3.
