= Perozdukht =

Perozdukht (also spelled Perozduxt) was a late 5th-century Sasanian princess, who was captured after the defeat and death of her father Peroz I by the forces of the Hephthalite ruler Akhshunwar in 484. Perozdukht afterwards became a member of the Hephthalite court and bore the Hephthalite king a daughter, who later married Peroz I's son Kavad I.

== Sources ==
- Schindel, Nikolaus (2013). "Kawād I i. Reign". In Yarshater, Ehsan (ed.). Encyclopædia Iranica. Vol. XVI/2: Kassites–Kégl, Sándor. London and New York: Routledge & Kegan Paul. pp. 136–141. ISBN 978-1-934283-39-4.
- Rezakhani, Khodadad (2017). "East Iran in Late Antiquity". ReOrienting the Sasanians: East Iran in Late Antiquity. Edinburgh University Press. pp. 1–256. ISBN 9781474400305. JSTOR 10.3366/j.ctt1g04zr8. (registration required)
