= Balash =

Shahanshah of the Sasanian Empire from 484 to 488

Balash 𐭥𐭥𐭣𐭠𐭧𐭱𐭩
- King of Kings of Iranians and non-Iranians
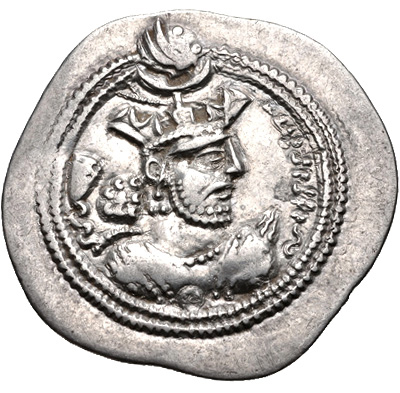
- Drachma of Balash, minted in Susa

Shahanshah of the Sasanian Empire
- Reign: 484–488
- Predecessor: Peroz I
- Successor: Kavad I
- Died: Unknown
- House: House of Sasan
- Father: Yazdegerd II
- Religion: Zoroastrianism

Balash (Middle Persian: 𐭥𐭥𐭣𐭠𐭧𐭱𐭩, Wardākhsh/Walākhsh) was the Sasanian King of Kings of Iran from 484 to 488. He was the brother and successor of Peroz I (r. 459–484), who was defeated and killed by the Hephthalites.

== Name ==
Balāsh (بلاش) is the New Persian form of the Middle Persian Wardākhsh/Walākhsh (Inscriptional Pahlavi: 𐭥𐭥𐭣𐭠𐭧𐭱𐭩 wrdʾḥšy; late Book Pahlavi forms gwlḥš- Gulakhsh- and Gulāsh-). The etymology of the name is unclear, although Ferdinand Justi proposes that Walagaš, the first form of the name, is a compound of words "strength" (varəda), and "handsome" (gaš or geš in Modern Persian).

The Greek forms of his name are Blases (Βλάσης) and Balas (Βάλας).

== Reign ==
In 484, Peroz I (r. 459–484) was defeated and killed by a Hephthalite (Note: The Hephthalites were a tribal group that was most prominent of the "Iranian Huns". In the second half of the 5th-century, they controlled Tukharistan and also seemingly chunks of southern Transoxiana.) army near Balkh. His army was completely destroyed, and his body was never found. Four of his sons and brothers had also died. The main Sasanian cities of the eastern region of Khorasan−Nishapur, Herat and Marw were now under Hephthalite rule. Sukhra, a member of the Parthian House of Karen, one of the Seven Great Houses of Iran, quickly raised a new force and stopped the Hephthalites from achieving further success. Peroz' brother, Balash, was elected as shah by the Iranian magnates, most notably Sukhra and the Mihranid general Shapur Mihran.

Immediately after ascending the throne, Balash sought peace with the Hephthalites, which cost the Sasanians a heavy tribute. Little is known about Balash, but he is perceived by eastern sources as a mild and tolerant ruler. He was very tolerant of Christianity, which earned him a reputation among Christian authors, who described him as a mild and generous monarch. Nevertheless, it would seem that Balash was only a nominee of the powerful nobleman and de facto ruler Sukhra.

At the announcement of the death of Peroz, the Iranian nobles of Sasanian Armenia, including the prominent nobleman Shapur Mihran, had become eager to go to the Sasanian capital of Ctesiphon to elect a new sovereign. This had allowed the Armenians under Vahan Mamikonian to proclaim independence from the Sasanians. Given the situation of the weakness in Iran, Balash did not send an army to fight the rebels, which forced him to conclude peace with the Armenians. The conditions of the peace were: all existing fire-altars in Armenia should be destroyed and no new ones should be constructed; Christians in Armenia should have freedom of worship and conversions to Zoroastrianism should be stopped: land should not be allotted to people who convert to Zoroastrianism; the Iranian shah should, in person, administer Armenia and through the aid of governors or deputies. In 485, Balash appointed Vahan Mamikonian as the marzban of Armenia. A few months later, a son of Peroz named Zarer rose in rebellion. Balash, with the aid of the Armenians, put down the rebellion, captured and killed him. In 488, Balash, who was an unpopular figure among the nobility and clergy, was deposed after a reign of just four years. Sukhra played a main role in Balash's deposition, and appointed Peroz's son Kavad as the new shah of Iran.

== Sources ==
- Payne, Richard (2015). "The Reinvention of Iran: The Sasanian Empire and the Huns". In Maas, Michael (ed.). The Cambridge Companion to the Age of Attila. Cambridge University Press. pp. 282–299. ISBN 978-1-107-63388-9.
- Potts, Daniel T. (2018). "Sasanian Iran and its northeastern frontier". In Mass, Michael; Di Cosmo, Nicola (eds.). Empires and Exchanges in Eurasian Late Antiquity. Cambridge University Press. pp. 1–538. ISBN 9781316146040.
- Pourshariati, Parvaneh (2008). Decline and Fall of the Sasanian Empire: The Sasanian-Parthian Confederacy and the Arab Conquest of Iran. London and New York: I.B. Tauris. ISBN 978-1-84511-645-3.
- Schindel, Nikolaus (2013). "Kawād I i. Reign". In Yarshater, Ehsan (ed.). Encyclopædia Iranica. Vol. XVI/2: Kassites–Kégl, Sándor. London and New York: Routledge & Kegan Paul. pp. 136–141. ISBN 978-1-934283-39-4.
- Shahbazi, A. Shapur (2005). "Sasanian dynasty". In Yarshater, Ehsan (ed.). Encyclopædia Iranica (Online ed.). Encyclopædia Iranica Foundation.
- Frye, R. N. (1983). "The political history of Iran under the Sasanians". In Yarshater, Ehsan (ed.). The Cambridge History of Iran: The Seleucid, Parthian and Sasanian Periods. Vol. 3(1). Cambridge: Cambridge University Press. ISBN 0-521-20092-X.
- Daryaee, Touraj (2009). Sasanian Persia: The Rise and Fall of an Empire. I.B.Tauris. pp. 1–240. ISBN 978-0857716668.
- Chaumont, M. L.; Schippmann, K. (1988). "Balāš, Sasanian king of kings". In Yarshater, Ehsan (ed.). Encyclopædia Iranica. Vol. III/6: Baḵtīārī tribe II–Banān. London and New York: Routledge & Kegan Paul. pp. 574–580. ISBN 978-0-71009-118-5.
- Daryaee, Touraj; Rezakhani, Khodadad (2017). "The Sasanian Empire". In Daryaee, Touraj (ed.). King of the Seven Climes: A History of the Ancient Iranian World (3000 BCE - 651 CE). UCI Jordan Center for Persian Studies. pp. 1–236. ISBN 9780692864401.
- Rezakhani, Khodadad (2017). ReOrienting the Sasanians: East Iran in Late Antiquity. Edinburgh University Press. pp. 1–256. ISBN 9781474400305.
- McDonough, Scott (2011). "The Legs of the Throne: Kings, Elites, and Subjects in Sasanian Iran". In Arnason, Johann P.; Raaflaub, Kurt A. (eds.). The Roman Empire in Context: Historical and Comparative Perspectives. John Wiley & Sons, Ltd. pp. 290–321. doi:10.1002/9781444390186.ch13. ISBN 9781444390186.

Balash Sasanian dynasty
Preceded by Peroz I	King of Kings of Iran and non-Iran; 484–488	Succeeded by Kavad I
