= Zarer =

Sasanian Empire rebel

Zarer (also spelled Zarir, Zariadres and Zareh) was a Sasanian prince who attempted to seize the throne from his brother Balash (r. 484–488) in 485. He only appears in the work of the contemporary Armenian historian Ghazar Parpetsi.

After the death of Peroz I (r. 459–484), Balash was elected as king by the nobility and clergy. Zarer, dissatisfied with the election, rebelled. Balash was thus forced to make peace with his enemy Vahan Mamikonian and sent him at the head of an army to suppress the rebellion of Zarer.

Zarer was shortly defeated, and fled to the mountains, but was quickly captured and "shot down like an animal".

== Bibliography ==
=== Ancient works ===
- Ghazar Parpetsi, History of the Armenians.

=== Modern works ===
- Chaumont, M. L.; Schippmann, K. (1988). "Balāš". Encyclopaedia Iranica, Vol. III, Fasc. 6. pp. 574–580.
- Daryaee, Touraj (2020). "Sasanian Coins & Kingship". Journal of Late Antiquity.
- Dédéyan, Gérard (2007). Histoire du peuple arménien (in French). Toulouse: Éd. Privat. ISBN 978-2-7089-6874-5.
- Grousset, René (1947). Histoire de l'Arménie des origines à 1071 (in French). Paris: Payot.
- Pourshariati, Parvaneh (2008). Decline and Fall of the Sasanian Empire: The Sasanian-Parthian Confederacy and the Arab Conquest of Iran. London and New York: I.B. Tauris. ISBN 978-1-84511-645-3.
