= Shapur of Ray =

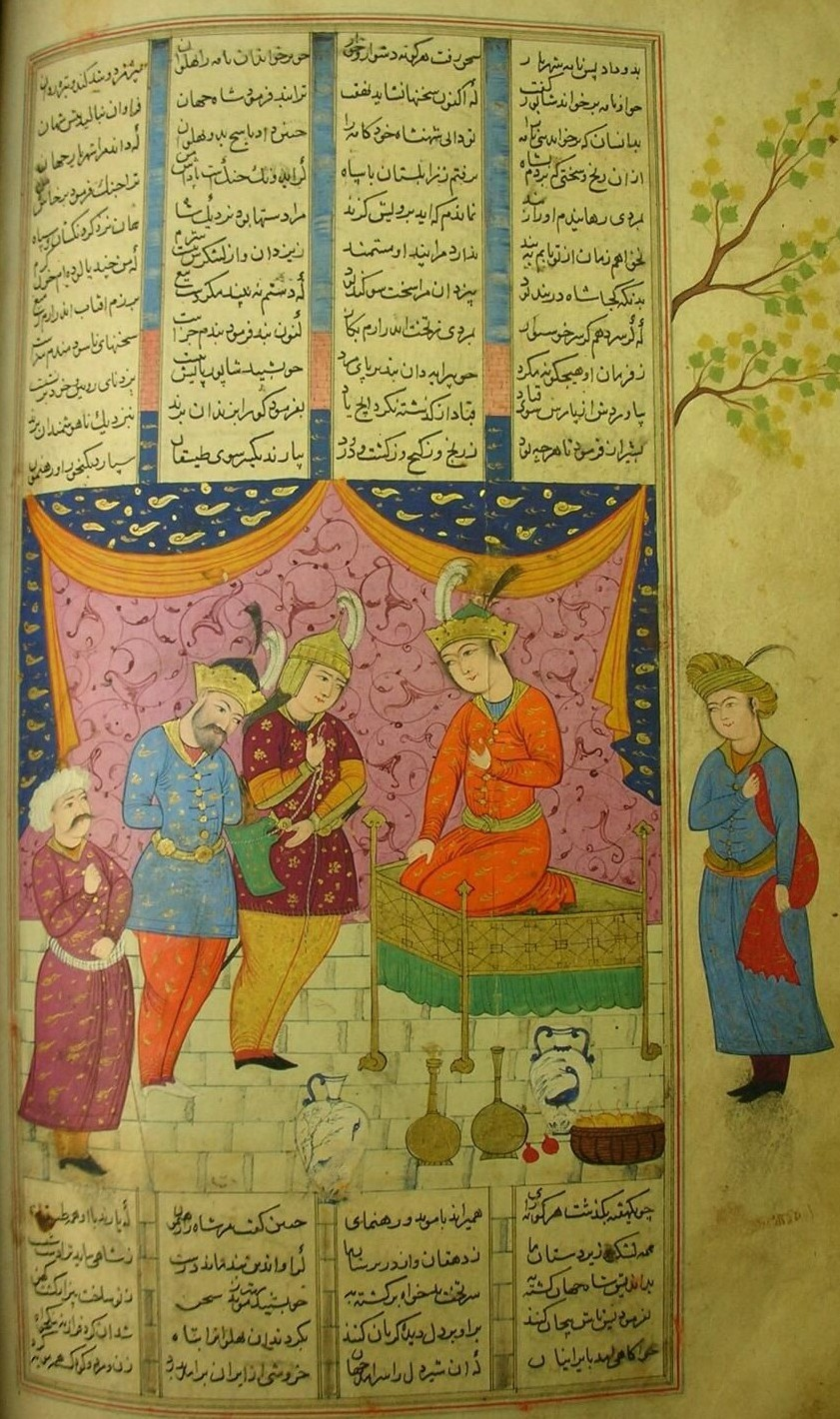
Shapur of Ray leads Sukhra before Kavad I, from a copy of the Shahnameh, dated 1592

Shapur of Ray was a Sasanian military officer from the Mihran family. The city Ray in his name was the seat of the Mihran family.

== Biography ==
According to Abu Hanifa Dinawari (d. 896), Shapur was the governor of the two Mesopotamian districts of Khutarniyah and Babylonia during Kavad I's reign. According to al-Tabari, he held the rank of "Supreme Commander of the Land" (iṣbahbadh al-bilād). Ferdowsi records him being recalled by Kavad I to destroy the powerful Sukhra of Karen family, who was also Shapur Razi's rival. Shapur Razi defeated and captured Sukhra in Shiraz. The Mihran-Karen rivalry became proverbial in the contemporary Sasanian society, as reflected in the expression "Sukhra's wind has died away, and a wind belonging to Mihran has now started to blow".

He briefly served as the governor (marzban) of Persian Armenia from 483 to 484.

== Sources ==
- Pourshariati, Parvaneh (2008). Decline and Fall of the Sasanian Empire: The Sasanian-Parthian Confederacy and the Arab Conquest of Iran. London and New York: I.B. Tauris. ISBN 978-1-84511-645-3.

Preceded by Zarmihr Hazarwuxt	Marzban of Persian Armenia; 483–484	Succeeded by Vahan Mamikonian
