= Gerard Delanty =

British sociologist (born 1960)

- Born: 1960 (age 65–66); Ireland
- Education: University College Cork
- Known for: Research on cosmopolitanism theory and modernity Editor of European Journal of Social Theory
- Scientific career
- Fields: Sociology
- Workplaces: University of Sussex; University of Liverpool

Gerard Delanty (born 1960) is a British-based sociologist and Professor of Sociology and Social & Political Thought at the University of Sussex. He is also the editor of European Journal of Social Theory.

== Bibliography ==
- Delanty, Gerard (2013) Formations of European modernity: a historical and political sociology of Europe. Palgrave Macmillan, London. ISBN 9781137287915 (In Press)
- Delanty, Gerard, ed. (2012) Handbook of cosmopolitanism studies. Routledge International Handbooks . Routledge. ISBN 9780415600811
- Delanty, Gerard, Giorgi, Liana and Sassatelli, Monica, eds. (2011) Festivals and the Cultural Public Sphere. Routledge Advances in Sociology . Routledge, Abingdon and New York. ISBN 9780415587303
- Delanty, Gerard and Turner, Stephen (2011) Routledge International Handbook of Contemporary Social and Political Theory. Routledge International Handbooks . Routledge, Abingdon and New York. ISBN 9780415548250
- Inglis, David and Delanty, Gerard, eds. (2010) Cosmopolitanism. Critical Concepts in the Social Sciences, 1-4 . Routledge. ISBN 9780415498814
- Delanty, Gerard (2009) The cosmopolitan imagination: the renewal of critical social theory. Cambridge University Press, Cambridge. ISBN 9780521695459
- Delanty, Gerard (2009) The European Heritage: History, Memory and Time. In: The SAGE Handbook of European Studies. SAGE Publications, London, pp. 36–51. ISBN 9781412933957
- Delanty, Gerard, Jones, Paul and Wodak, Ruth, eds. (2008) Identity, belonging and migration. Studies in Social and Political Thought . Liverpool University Press, Liverpool. ISBN 9781846311185
- Delanty, Gerard and Rumford, Chris (2005) Rethinking Europe: Social Theory and the Implications of Europeanization. Routledge, Abingdon and New York. ISBN 9780415347143
- Delanty, Gerard (2005) Social Science: Philosophical and Methodological Foundations (Second Edition). Concepts in the Social Sciences . Open University Press, Maidenhead. ISBN 9780335217212
- Delanty, Gerard (2003) Community. Key Ideas . Routledge, London. ISBN 9780415236867
- Delanty, Gerard and O'Mahony, Patrick (2002) Nationalism and Social Theory: Modernity and the Recalcitrance of Nation. Sage Publications Ltd., London. ISBN 9780761954514
- Delanty, Gerard (2001) Challenging knowledge: the university in the knowledge society. Open University Press, Buckingham. ISBN 9780335205783
- Delanty, Gerard (2000) Citizenship in the global age: culture, society and politics. Open University Press, Buckingham. ISBN 9780335204892
- Delanty, Gerard (2000) Modernity and postmodernity: knowledge, power, the self. SAGE Publications, London. ISBN 9780761959038
- Delanty, Gerard (1999) Social Theory in a Changing World: Conceptions of Modernity. Polity Press, Cambridge. ISBN 9780745619187
- Delanty, Gerard (1997) Social Science: Beyond Realism and Constructivism. Concepts in the Social Sciences . Open University Press, Buckingham. ISBN 9780335198610
- Delanty, Gerard (1995) Inventing Europe: Idea, Identity, Reality. Palgrave Macmillan, Basingstoke. ISBN 9780333622032
