= Jóhann P. Árnason =

Icelandic-born Australian sociologist (born 1940)

- Born: Jóhann Páll Árnason; 1940 (age 85–86); Dalvík, Iceland
- Awards: Humboldt Research Award (2008); Palacký Medal (2012)

Academic background
- Education: Charles University (1960–1966); University of Frankfurt am Main (PhD, 1970); Bielefeld University (Dr. phil. hab., 1975)
- Doctoral advisor: Jürgen Habermas

Academic work
- Discipline: Sociology
- Sub-discipline: Historical sociology
- School or tradition: Phenomenological post-Marxism
- Institutions: Heidelberg University (1972–1975); La Trobe University (1975–2003); University of Akureyri (2007–?); Charles University (2007–2015)

Jóhann Páll Árnason (born 1940) is an Icelandic-born European and Australian historical sociologist. He is particularly known for his early work on phenomenological Marxism, following Karel Kosík and Cornelius Castoriadis, and for his later post-Marxist hermeneutic phenomenological analyses of civilizations, particularly in collaboration with Shmuel Eisenstadt on "multiple modernities" and the Axial Age. He is a member of the Academia Europaea and was the recipient of the 2008 Humboldt Research Award.

Árnason is a professor of sociology emeritus at La Trobe University in Australia, where he was an editor of the journal Thesis Eleven. After his retirement at La Trobe, he also worked at the University of Akureyri in Iceland and taught at Charles University in the Czech Republic.

== Early life and education ==
Árnason was born in Dalvík, Iceland, in 1940. He first visited Bohemia in 1959 to take a Czech language course in Mariánské Lázně. He then studied philosophy and history in Prague at Charles University 1960–1966, where he witnessed de-Stalinization and the Prague Spring. While there, he became a student of Karel Kosík and Jan Patočka and developed an interest in phenomenological Marxism, particularly through Kosík's Dialectics of the Concrete (1963).

After the Prague Spring, he continued his studies with Jürgen Habermas at the University of Frankfurt am Main 1968–1970, earning his doctorate with a dissertation on Herbert Marcuse and historical anthropology. In 1970, he became a Humboldt Research Fellow hosted by Habermas. He received his habilitation from Bielefeld University with a thesis on the critical theory of the subject.

== Career ==
Árnason's first professorial position was at Heidelberg University 1972–1975, after which he was briefly a visiting professor at Bielefeld University. By the end of 1975, he had accepted a position at La Trobe University in Melbourne, Australia, where he worked as a sociologist through his retirement emeritus in 2003. At La Trobe, Árnason was an editor of the post-Marxist journal Thesis Eleven from 1987 to 2003.

In the 1970s, he became interested in the work of philosopher Cornelius Castoriadis, and he studied with Castoriadis directly while visiting Paris in the 1980s. In this work, he developed a response to Habermas's critical theory of communicative action from hermeneutic phenomenology, culminating in the book Praxis und Interpretation: Sozialphilosophische Studien (1988). He was later recognized for combining Castoriadis's ideas with study of Maurice Merleau-Ponty and Max Weber to develop a phenomenological approach to historical sociology and civilizational analysis in terms of "cultural articulations of the world," a translation of Merleau-Ponty's mise en forme du monde.

He is also known for his collaborations with the Israeli sociologist of civilization Shmuel Eisenstadt, which began as collaboration on analysis of Japanese civilization that Árnason published in the 1990s. Their work together has been particularly recognized for its contribution to debates on the nature and dynamics of the Axial Age, for instance in Axial Civilizations and World History (2005), which Árnason co-edited with Eisenstadt and Björn Wittrock, as well as its developments of Eisenstadt's "multiple modernities" research program.

After his retirement from La Trobe, Árnason continued to write and teach. He moved back to Europe in 2006 and then worked in Iceland at the University of Akureyri and at various visiting appointments, especially in the Czech Republic; he taught winter semesters annually at Charles University in Prague 2007–2015.

In 2008, Árnason received the Humboldt Research Award. He was the subject of a festchrift special issue of the European Journal of Social Theory in 2011. In 2012, he won the František Palacký Medal of the Czech Academy of Sciences. He was elected to membership of the Academia Europaea in 2021. He holds honorary doctorates from the University of Iceland (Philosophy, 2011) and Jan Evangelista Purkyně University in Ústí nad Labem (Historical Sciences, 2014).

== Selected works ==
=== Books ===
- Praxis und Interpretation: Sozialphilosophische Studien (in German). Suhrkamp, 1988.
- The Future that Failed: Origins and Destinies of the Soviet Model. Routledge, 1993.
- Social Theory and Japanese Experience: The Dual Civilization. Sage, 1997.
- Civilizations in Dispute: Historical Questions and Theoretical Traditions. Brill, 2003.
- Co-edited with S.N. Eisenstadt and Björn Wittrock: Axial Civilizations and World History. Brill, 2005.
- Co-edited with Kurt Raaflaub: The Roman Empire in Context: Historical and Comparative Perspectives. Malden, 2011.
- Co-edited with Björn Wittrock: Nordic Paths to Modernity. Berghahn Books, 2012.

=== Articles ===
- Arnason, Johann P. (1989). "The Imaginary Constitution of Modernity". Revue européenne des sciences sociales. 27 (86): 323–337. JSTOR 40369875.
- Arnason, Johann P. (August 1993). "Merleau-Ponty and Max Weber: an Unfinished Dialogue". Thesis Eleven. 36 (1): 82–98. doi:10.1177/072551369303600105.
- Arnason, Johann P.; Habermas, Jürgen (November 2000). "Globalism, Ideology and Traditions: Interview with Jürgen Habermas". Thesis Eleven. 63 (1): 1–10. doi:10.1177/0725513600063000002.
- Arnason, Johann P. (Winter 2000). "Communism and Modernity". Daedalus. 129 (1): 61–90. JSTOR 20027615.
- Arnason, Johann P. (2002). "The Forgotten 1968 and the False End of History". Thesis Eleven. 68 (1): 89–94. doi:10.1177/0725513602068001007.
- Arnason, Johann P. (2007). "Civilizational Analysis: A Paradigm in the Making". In Holton, Robert J.; Nasson, William R. (eds.). Encyclopedia of Life Support Systems. Vol. World Civilizations and History of Human Development. Eolss Publishers. pp. 1–34.
- Arnason, Johann P. (Autumn 2017). "Theorizing the History of Religions: The Weberian Agenda and its Unresolved Issues". Social Imaginaries. 3 (2): 109–143. doi:10.5840/si20173216.
- Arnason, Johann P. (November 2022). "Civilizational approaches and contemporary challenges". MAUSS International (2): 388–406. JSTOR 48848658.

== Sources ==
- Adams, Suzi; Smith, Karl E.; Vlahov, George (February 2011). "Introduction: Arnason's social theory". European Journal of Social Theory. 14 (1): 3–8. doi:10.1177/1368431010394500.
- Adams, Suzi (April 2019). "Beyond a socio-centric concept of culture: Johann Arnason's macro-phenomenology and critique of sociological solipsism". Thesis Eleven. 151 (1): 96–116. doi:10.1177/0725513619830433.
- Arnason, Johann P.; Černý, Karel (2013). "Rozhovor s Johannem P. Arnasonem". Sociologický Časopis / Czech Sociological Review (in Czech). 49 (4): 625–644. JSTOR 23535954.
- Beilharz, Peter (May 2006). "Thesis Eleven – 25 Years on". Thesis Eleven. 85 (1): 6–7. doi:10.1177/0725513606062948.
- Blokker, Paul; Delanty, Gerard (February 2011). "An interview with Johann P. Arnason: Critical theory, modernity, civilizations and democracy". European Journal of Social Theory. 14 (1): 119–132. doi:10.1177/1368431010394516.
- Wittrock, Björn (2006). "Reviewed Work: Civilizations in Dispute: Historical Questions and Theoretical Traditions by Johann P. Arnason". European Journal of Sociology. 47 (3): 407–416. JSTOR 23998952.
