= European Journal of Social Theory =

- Discipline: Social theory, Sociology
- Language: English
- Edited by: Gerard Delanty

Publication details
- History: 1998-present
- Publisher: SAGE Publications
- Frequency: Quarterly
- Impact factor: 2.333 (2019)

Standard abbreviations
- ISO 4: Eur. J. Soc. Theory

Indexing
- ISSN: 1368-4310 (print); 1461-7137 (web)
- OCLC no.: 41551775

Links
- Journal homepage; Online access; Online archive

The European Journal of Social Theory (EJST) is a quarterly peer-reviewed academic journal that covers all aspects social theory. The editor-in-chief is Gerard Delanty (University of Sussex). The journal was established in 1998 and is published by SAGE Publications.

== Abstracting and indexing ==
The journal is abstracted and indexed in:

- Scopus
- Social Sciences Citation Index
- Sociological Abstracts
- Journal Citation Reports
- Worldwide Political Science Abstracts
- The Philosopher's Index
- Anthropological Index Online
- International Political Science Abstracts
- Academic Search Elite

According to the Journal Citation Reports, its 2019 impact factor is 2.333.

== See also ==
- Social theory
- Sociology
- Academic journal
- Peer review
- Social science
- Impact factor
- Scopus
- Social Sciences Citation Index
