= Akhshunwar (title) =

Title used by Hephthalite kings

Akhshunwar (Sogdian: əxšōnδār, Middle Persian: Xašnawāz) was a ruling title used by the Hephthalite kings in the 5th and 6th-centuries.

The title is of Eastern Iranian origin; according W.B. Henning, its original form was ʾxšʾwndʾr (axšōndār), meaning "king", "ruler." G. Widengren, however, suggests that the original form was the Sogdian ʾxšʾwnwʾr, "power bearer." In the New Persian epic Shahnameh ("The Book of Kings") of the medieval Persian poet Ferdowsi, it was transformed into Khushnawaz (meaning "the beautiful player, musician"), and was used as a name instead. Some scholars support the theory that the name of the Kidarite king Kunkhas shared the same origin as Akhshunwar, which has in turn led to the suggestion that Akhshunwar was initially a title used by Kidarites, later to be adopted by Hephthalites when they supplanted them.

== Sources ==
- Brunner, C. J. (1984). "Aḵšonvār". In Yarshater, Ehsan (ed.). Encyclopædia Iranica. Vol. I/7: Ahriman–Alafrank. London and New York: Routledge & Kegan Paul. pp. 729–730. ISBN 978-0-71009-096-6.
- Yarshater, Ehsan, ed. (2018). "Ḵušnawār/Ḵušnawāz". Encyclopædia Iranica (Online ed.). Encyclopædia Iranica Foundation.
- Rezakhani, Khodadad (2017). ReOrienting the Sasanians: East Iran in Late Antiquity. Edinburgh University Press. ISBN 9781474400305.
