= Kurt Raaflaub =

Swiss historian of ancient Greece and Rome (1941–2023)

Kurt Arnold Raaflaub (15 February 1941 – 12 September 2023) was a Swiss and American historian and emeritus named chair professor of classics and ancient history at Brown University, where he taught Greek and Roman history. He was a president of the Society for Classical Studies in 2008 and won the American Historical Association's 2004 James Henry Breasted Prize for his book The Discovery of Freedom in Ancient Greece.

== Early life and education ==
Raaflaub was born to Fritz Raaflaub and Heidi Ninck on 15 February 1941 in Buea, Cameroon, where his father worked as a missionary. After returning to his Swiss hometown of Basel at age seven, he graduated from the University of Basel with a doctorate in classics and ancient history in 1970. He served in the Swiss military.

== Career ==
Raaflaub was first employed at the Freie Universität Berlin, Germany in 1972, and earned his habilitation there in 1979. After a junior fellowship at the Center for Hellenic Studies in Washington, D.C. 1976–1977, in 1978 he became a professor at Brown University in Providence, Rhode Island, remaining in this position until his retirement in 2009. Before his retirement, he held several named chairs, beginning with the John Rowe Workman Distinguished Professorship of Classics and the Classical Tradition (1989–1992) and retiring as David Herlihy University Professor (2001–2023).

He was elected to corresponding membership of the German Archaeological Institute in 1995. He and his wife Deborah Boedeker co-directed the Center for Hellenic Studies from 1992 to 2000. In 2004, he received the James Henry Breasted Prize (now the AHA Prize in History Prior to CE 1000) from the American Historical Association for his book The Discovery of Freedom in Ancient Greece, published earlier that year. He was the 2008 president of the Society for Classical Studies.

After his retirement he continued to work, and he was awarded a Mellon Emeritus Fellowship in 2010.

== Personal life and death ==
Raaflaub was married to Deborah Boedeker. He was the brother of conductor Beat Raaflaub.

Raaflaub died after a fall on 12 September 2023, in Providence, Rhode Island, at the age of 82.
