= Denshapuh =

5th-century Iranian aristocrat

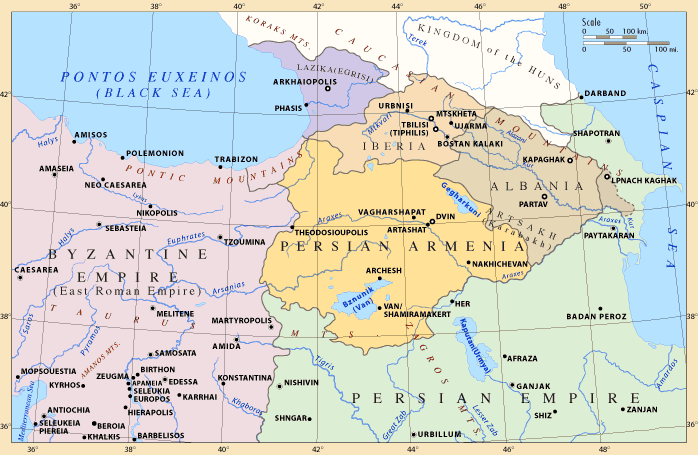
Map of Sasanian Armenia.

Denshapuh (shorter form of Vehdenshapuh, Middle Persian: Wehdēnšābuhr), was a 5th-century Iranian aristocrat who served as the quartermaster (hambarakapet) of Yazdegerd II (r. 438–457). He took part in the Sasanian campaign to force the Christian Armenians to renounce their religion and return to Zoroastrianism.

== Biography ==
In 447, Denshapuh was sent as Yazdegerd II's representative to Sasanian Armenia, allegedly to superintend the population count. However, he had in reality been invested with even greater authority than governor (marzban) Vasak of Syunik, and was appointed to re-establish Zoroastrianism in the country to distance it from Byzantine influence. He shortly started making several decrees, which greatly angered the Armenian church and its supporters.

According to the Armenian historian Stepanos Tarawnaci, Denshapuh "increased adultery and lit an Ohrmazd fire in Rshtunik," a region in Vaspurakan. However, this statement is a overexaggerated reference to the Sasanian crackdown of clerical celibacy, incitement of marriage between relatives, and transforming churches into fire temples, such as at the prominent Etchmiadzin Cathedral. Yazdegerd II's efforts to convert the Christian population resulted in a rebellion in the country, where the Sasanians eventually emerged victorious at Avarayr against the forces of Vardan Mamikonian. It is unknown if Denshapuh took part in the battle or what happened to him, as his name is no longer mentioned. A gem with his name written is conserved in the British Museum in London.

== Sources ==
- Russell, James (1994). "Denšapuh". Encyclopaedia Iranica, Vol. VII, Fasc. 3. p. 292.
- Payaslian, S (2008). The History of Armenia: From the Origins to the Present. Springer. p. 41. ISBN 978-0-230-60858-0.
