= Vardanank (novel) =

1943 novel by Derenik Demirchian

- Author: Derenik Demirchian
- Language: Armenian
- Genre: Historical novel
- Publication date: 1943
- Publication place: Armenia

Vardanank (Armenian: Վարդանանք) is an Armenian historical novel by Derenik Demirchian. It is about the Armenian rebellion in 450–451 against Sasanian Iran.

== Characters ==
- Vardan Mamikonian- leader of the Armenia
- Vasak of Syunik - regional governor of Armenia
- Yazdegerd II - Persian king
- Mihrnerseh
- Ghevond Erets
- Yeghishe
- Yeznik of Kolb
- Nershapuh of Artsrunik
- Artak of Mokk
- Atom of Gnunik
- Vahan Amatuni
- Gadisho of Khorkhorunik
- Artak of Rshtunik
- Gedeon
- Gyut of Vahevunik
- Garegin Srvandztyan
- Arsen Ishkhan
- Hamazasp Mamikonian
- Zohrak Mamikonian - son of Vardan Mamikonian
- Shushanik Mamikonian - daughter of Vardan Mamikonian
- Great Lady - mother of Vardan Mamikonian
- Mamikonian Lady - wife of Vardan Mamikonian
- Araqel
- Sahak
- Arten uncle
- Nerseh of Urts
- Tirots Bagratuni
- Astghik - daughter of Gedeon
- Anahit - daughter of Gedeon, wife of Artak of Mokk
- Ester - wife of Gedeon
- Moses of Chorene
- Denshapuh
- Vormizd
- Dareh
- Artashir
- Varazvaghan
- Varazdukht
- Parandzem - wife of Vasak of Syunik
- Atrnerseh - son of Vasak of Syunik
- Babken - son of Vasak of Syunik
