= Derenik Demirchian =

Armenian writer

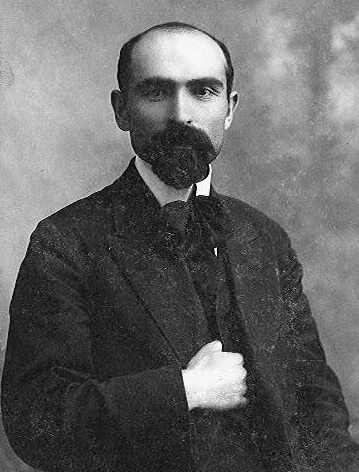
- Born: February 18, 1877; Akhalkalaki, Russian Empire
- Died: December 6, 1956 (aged 79); Yerevan, Armenian SSR, Soviet Union
- Citizenship: Russian Empire, Soviet Union
- Education: Gevorgian Seminary; Nersisian School; University of Geneva
- Occupations: Poet, novelist, translator and playwright
- Children: Vahe
- Writing career
- Period: 1890s-1956
- Notable works: Vardanank, Kaj Nazar
- Notable awards: Order of Lenin, Order of the Red Banner of Labour

Derenik Karapeti Demirchian (Note: Also Demirchyan) (Armenian: Դերենիկ Կարապետի Դեմիրճյան; February 18 [O.S. February 6], 1877 – December 6, 1956) was a Soviet and Armenian writer, novelist, poet, translator and playwright. He began his career as a poet, but later transitioned into prose writing. He was a prolific writer whose works deal with a wide variety of subjects. He is perhaps best known for his historical novel Vardanank (1943), which is a dramatization of the 5th-century Armenian rebellion led by Vardan Mamikonian.

== Life and career ==
=== Early life and education ===
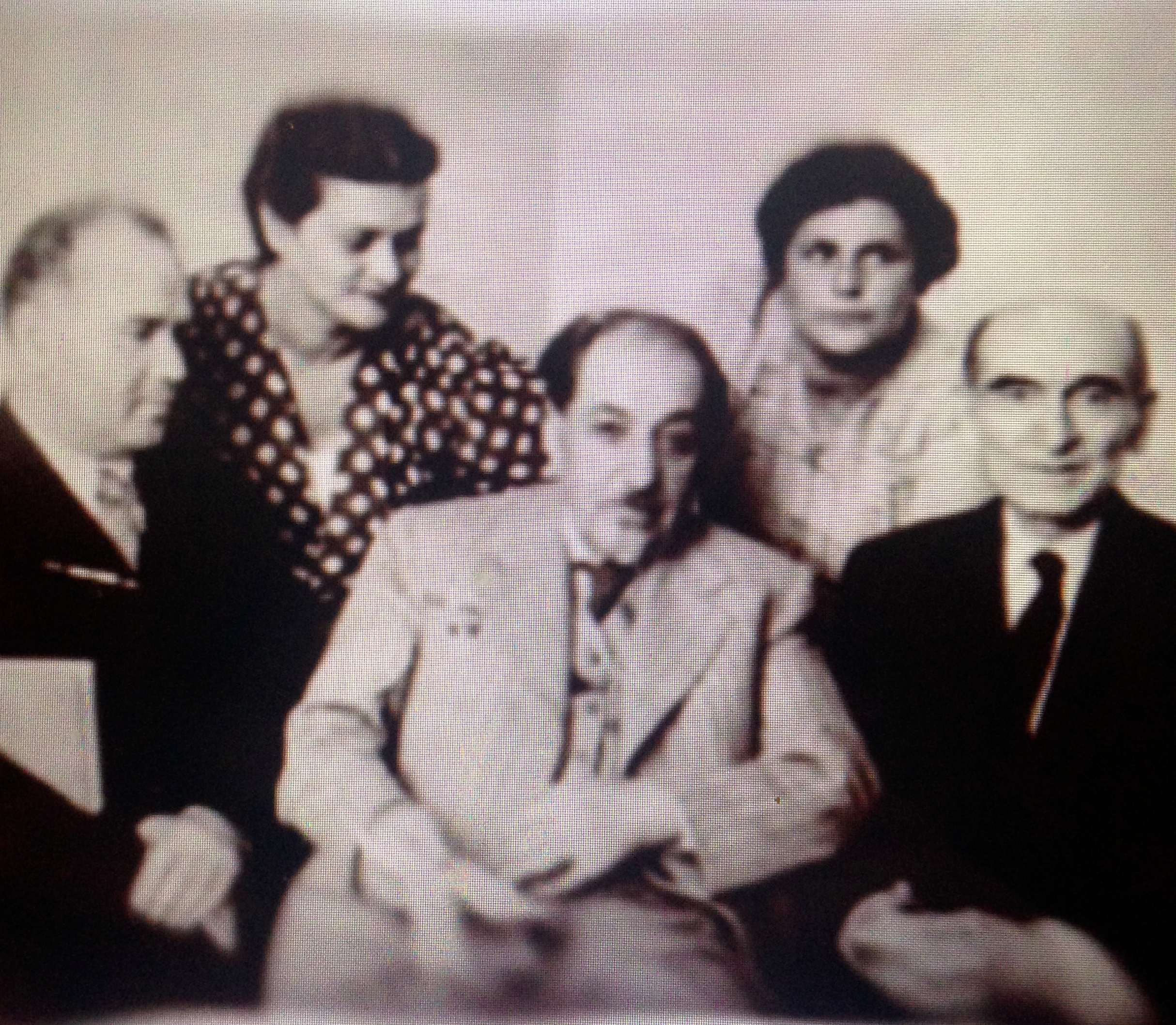
Front row, left to right: Armenian writers Hmayak Siras, Avetik Isahakyan, and Derenik Demirchian

Derenik Demirchian (originally Demirchoghlian) was born on February 18, 1877, in Akhalkalaki in the region of Javakheti in southern Georgia, then a part of the Russian Empire. He received his primary education at his hometown's Armenian parish school. Two years after finishing school, he moved to Ardahan (then a part of the Russian Empire, now in Turkey), where he continued his education under S. Ter-Meliksedekian.

In 1892, he was accepted into the Gevorgian Seminary in Etchmiadzin, where he was taught by the poet Hovhannes Hovhannisyan, who influenced Demirchian's views on literature. While at the seminary, he became familiar with world literature, reading authors such as Lermontov, Pushkin, Tolstoy, Goethe, Heine, Byron, and Shakespeare. In 1898, he graduated from the Nersisian School in Tiflis (present-day Tbilisi), then worked in Ardahan.

=== Early career ===
Demirchian began his literary career as a poet, publishing his first poem, titled "Apagan" ('The future'), in the journal Taraz ('Dress') in 1893. After this, he wrote for a number of Armenian journals, including Taraz, Murch ('Hammer') and Nor hosank ('New current'). He published his first booklet of poetry under the title Banasteghtsutyunner ('Poems') in 1899. His early works have been described as expressing feelings of hopelessness, sorrow and solitude.

In 1900, he settled in Tiflis, where he became a member of the Armenian literary group Vernatun, so named because its members met in the top-floor apartment of poet Hovhannes Tumanyan. In 1903, he worked as a cafeteria administrator at a factory in Baku owned by the Russian Armenian businessman Alexander Mantashev. Also in 1903, he moved to Moscow with the intention of studying music, but returned to Tiflis after a nervous breakdown.

Demirchian attended the University of Geneva from 1905 to 1910, graduating from the pedagogical faculty. He then returned to Tiflis, where he worked as a teacher. According to S. Hovhannisian, the Russian Revolution of 1905-1907 marked a turning point in Demirchian's career, after which he focused on "becoming spiritually closer to the people." This is symbolized by his patriotic poem "Lenktemur" ('Tamerlane'), in which Demirchian praises the strength of the people.

In 1913, he published his second collection of poems, and in 1920, he published another collection titled Garun ('Spring'), which contains his quatrains from the period 1902 to 1919. After 1919, Demirchian mostly wrote prose and plays. His play Vasak, about the 5th-century governor of Armenia who sided with the Persians against an Armenian rebellion, was performed in Tiflis in 1914. In 1919, his play Azgayin khaytarakutyun ('National disgrace') was produced. In 1922, the newly established Yerevan State Theater performed Demirchian's play Datastan ('Judgment'). In 1925, he moved to Yerevan and worked at the artistic department of the Institute of Science and Art.

=== Career in Soviet Armenia ===
Demirchian was one of the leading members of the "companions'" group of Soviet Armenian authors who did not follow either of the two main factions attempting to lead the way for the new Armenian literature. For some time, Demirchian avoided politically charged literature and his works were usually poorly received by official critics. However, he gained widespread popularity with his play Kaj Nazar ('Nazar the Brave'), a rags to riches comedy written in 1923 and first performed in 1924. Demirchian gave the play the subtitle "a folk tale-comedy in five acts for childlike adults and adultlike children."

Kaj Nazar was based on an Armenian folk tale which had been compiled from 66 sources by Hovhannes Tumanyan in 1908 and had already been adapted by notable authors such as Tumanyan and Avetik Isahakyan. In Kevork Bardakjian's view, Demirchian succeeded in "creating a remarkably witty comedy" by elaborating on the simple plot of the folk tale. Kaj Nazar was subsequently given professional productions in Yerevan, Tiflis, and Baku, and adapted into an opera and later a film (1940).

Several of Demirchian's plays from the 1930s, such as Fosforayin shogh ('Phosphoric ray', 1932), Napoleon Korkotyan (1934) and Kaputan (1938) deal with the socio-economic transformations in the Soviet Union at that time. Demirchian came under official criticism for his comedy Napoleon Korkotyan, which depicted corruption in a sovkhoz. In 1938, Demirchian wrote Yerkir hayreni ('Fatherland'), a drama about the 11th-century Armenian king Gagik II and his struggle with the Byzantines.

Demirchian's most notable work is Vardanank (parts 1 and 2, 1943–46, revised ed., 1951), a monumental patriotic novel about the 5th-century Armenian Christian rebellion led by Vardan Mamikonian against Sasanian Iran. This was one of several works written by Demirchian during World War II in support of the Soviet war effort. In Vardanank, Demirchian depicted the Armenian rebellion as primarily a political struggle to preserve Armenian national identity, rather than as a religious one. He maintained the traditional view of Vasak Siuni as a traitor.

From the mid-1920s, in addition to writing plays, Demirchian began writing and publishing in other prose genres, including short stories, novels, and children's stories. He also wrote articles on various subjects, including literary criticism, history, linguistics, and art criticism. He was also known as a translator from Russian into Armenian. His translation of the first volume of Nikolai Gogol's Dead Souls is the most highly regarded of his translations.

In the last years of his life, Demirchian worked on a novel about the inventor of the Armenian alphabet titled Mesrop Mashtots, which remained incomplete. According to Hrachya Kochar, the idea for Mashtots was given to Demirchian by Anastas Mikoyan. The writer received a number of state honors and medals for his literary achievements. In 1953, he became a member of the Armenian SSR Academy of Sciences. Demirchian died in Yerevan on December 6, 1956, and is buried at Yerevan's Central Cemetery. The annual Derenik Demirchian State Prize was established in 1980. The Derenik Demirchian House–Museum has operated since 1977 in Yerevan, in the house where the writer lived from 1929 to 1956.

== Plays ==
- Vasak, 1912
- Azgayin khaytarakutyun ('National disgrace'), 1919
- Hovnan Metsatun ('Wealthy Hovnan'), 1919
- Datastan ('Judgement'), 1922
- Kaj Nazar ('Nazar the Brave'), 1923
- Haghtakan siro yerge ('The song of victorious love'), 1927
- Fosforayin shogh ('Phosphoric ray'), 1932
- Kaputan, 1938
- Yerkir hayreni ('Fatherland'), 1939
- Napoleon Korkotyan, 1934
- Enkerner ('Comrades'), 1942
