= Syunik (historical province) =

Region of historical Armenia

Coordinates: 39.2500°N 46.2500°E

Syunik Սիւնիք
- Province of Kingdom of Armenia
- 189 BC–428 AD
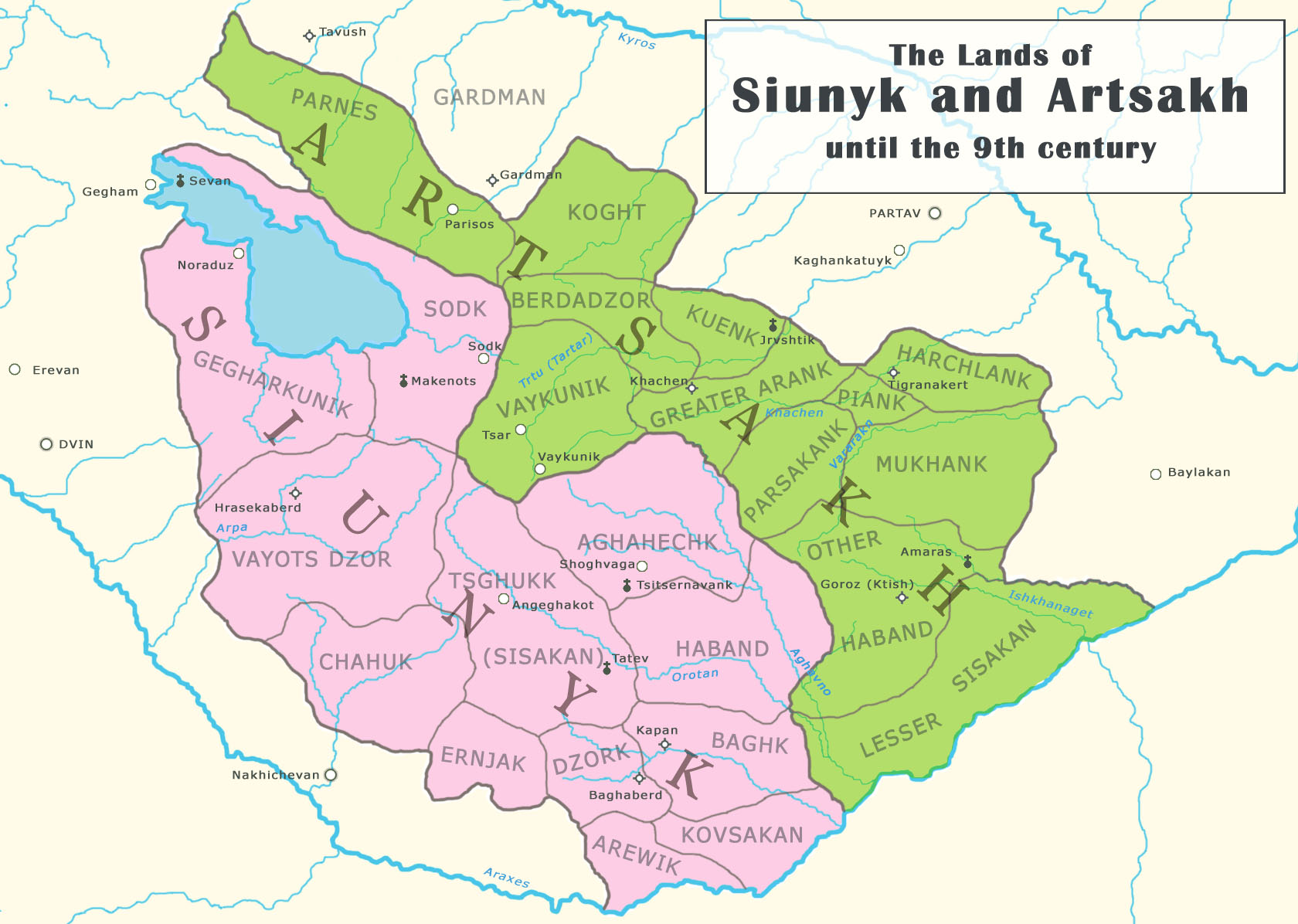
- Demonym: Syunetsi
- Historical era: Antiquity, Middle Ages
  - Established: 189 BC
  - Province of Armenia: 189 BC – 428 AD
  - Disestablished: 428 AD
- Today part of: Armenia, Nagorno-Karabakh, Azerbaijan, Iran

Syunik (Old Armenian: Սիւնիք, romanized: Siwnik') was a region of historical Armenia and the ninth province (nahang) of the Kingdom of Armenia from 189 BC until 428 AD. From the 7th to 9th centuries, it fell under Arab control. In 821, it formed two Armenian principalities: Kingdom of Syunik and principality of Khachen, which around the year 1000 was proclaimed the Kingdom of Artsakh, becoming one of the last medieval eastern Armenian kingdoms and principalities to maintain its autonomy following the Turkic invasions of the 11th to 14th centuries.

== Name ==
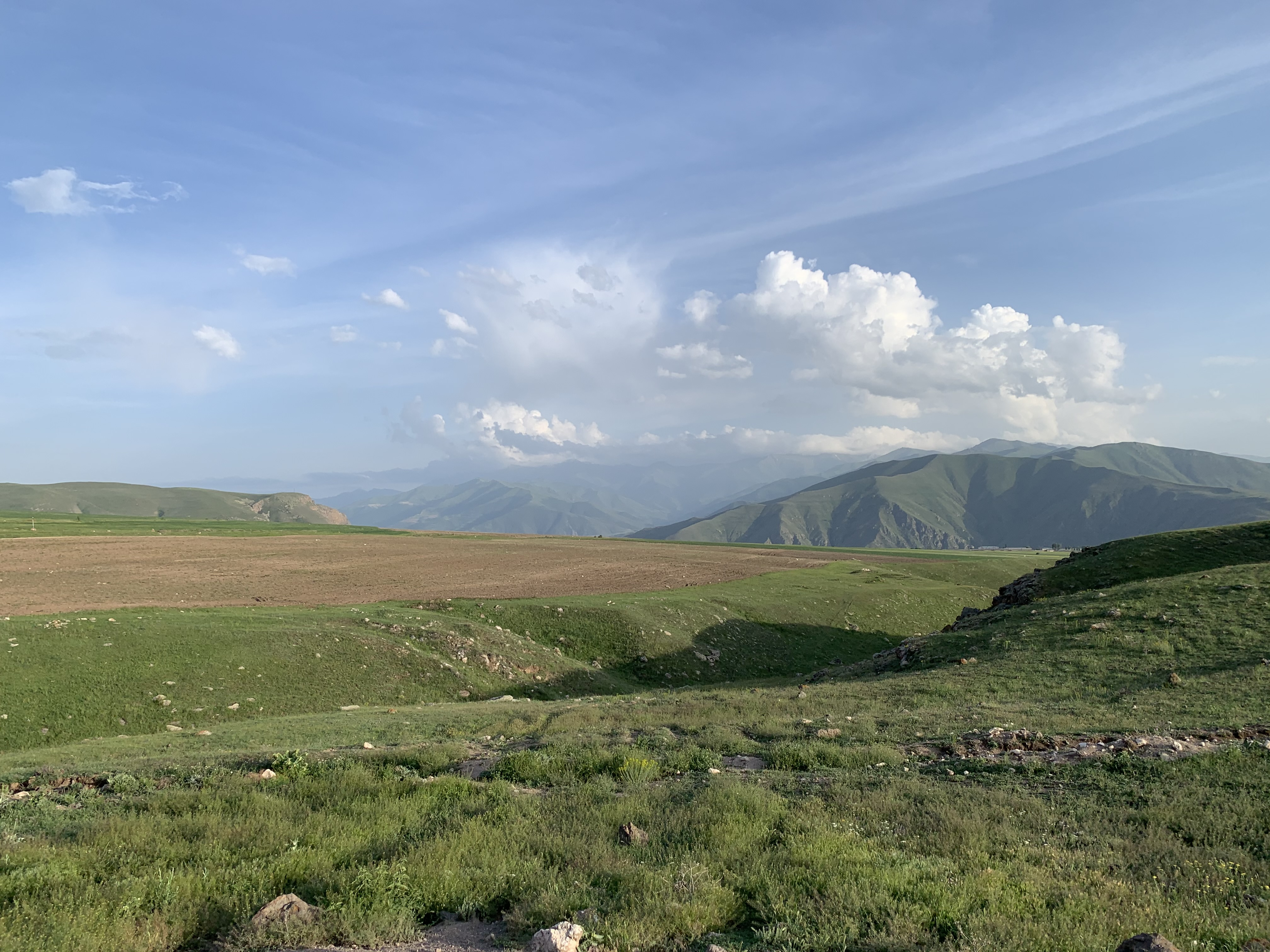
Views of Syunik

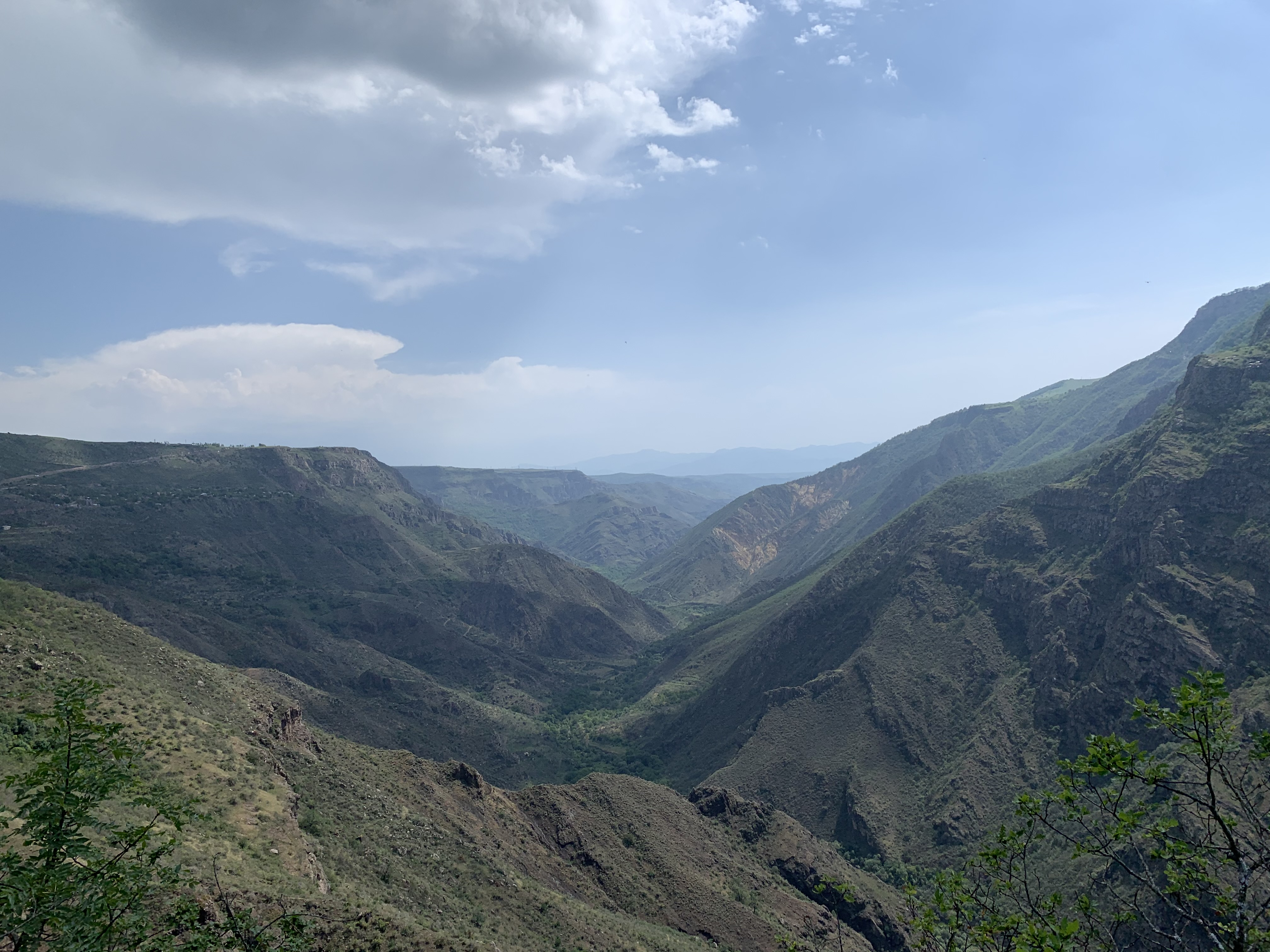
Views of Syunik

The name Syunik is ancient and appears in the earliest Armenian written sources.Sisakan, a later name for the province of Iranian origin, first appears in the 6th-century Syriac chronicle of Pseudo-Zacharias; it is first mentioned in Armenian sources in the history of Movses Khorenatsi, who explains this name as deriving from Sisak, the name of one of the descendants of the legendary Armenian progenitor Hayk. Strabo mentions a region of Armenia called Phaunitis, which some scholars read as *Saunitis and connect with Syunik. If Phaunitis is not to be identified with Syunik, then the earliest mention of the name in Greek sources is by Eusebius in the 4th century, who refers to it as Saunia. Later, in the 6th century, the Byzantine historian Procopius refers to the inhabitants of the province as Sounitai. In the Ravenna Cosmography (c. 700), Syunik is referred to in Latin as Siania Caucasorum. In Georgian sources, Syunik is typically called Sivnieti, while Arabic sources knew it as Sisajan, borrowed from Persian.

The ultimate etymology of the name Syunik is unknown. At first glance, it appears to be the plural of Siwni, the name of the ancient princely dynasty of Syunik (the noble house, like the province, is also alternatively called Sisakan). Historian Armen Petrosyan has suggested that Syunik is related to the name of the Urartian sun god Shivini/Siwini (itself a borrowing from the Hittites), noting the similarity between the names and the high number of sun-related placenames in the region.Robert H. Hewsen writes that Syunik is probably identical with the place name Ṣuluqū mentioned in Urartian cuneiform inscriptions.

== Geography ==
Syunik was a big region in the east of historical Armenia. In the west and north-west, it bordered on the Ayrarat Province; in the east, the natural border between Syunik and Artsakh passed through the Hakari river (left inflow of the Aras). In the north-west, Syunik shared a border with lands situated in the direct neighborhood of Ganja, and in the south-west, it bordered on Nakhichevan (Vaspurakan Province). The north of Syunik comprised Gegharkunik and Sotk which lied on the coast of Lake Sevan. In the south, the territory of Syunik extended to the Aras River.

According to Ashkharhatsuyts in the 7th century, Syunik was divided into 12 administrative-territorial regions (gavars):

9. To the east from Ayrarat - between Yeraskh (Araks) and Artsakh - Syrunik has 12 regions: 1. Alijna, 2. Chaguk, 3. Vayots Dzor, 4. Gelakuni with the sea, 5. Sotk, 6. Agaghechk, 7. Tsgak, 8. Gaband, 9. Bagk or Balk, 10. Dzork, 11. Arevvik, 12. Kusakan. The province is known for such endemic plant species as myrtus, gereri (?) and grenade. It also has many mountainous areas.

— Anania Shirakatsi, Ashkharhatsuyts

Ptolemy refers to the Sotk region as Sodukena (from the ancient Greek Σοδουκην) in the following record: "The regions of Armenia at the junction of the rivers Euphrates, Kir ad Aras; here's the essence: Kotarzen – near the Moschian Mountains, above the so-called "heavenly creatures" (?), Tosarensk (?) and Otene – along the river Kir, Koltensk (?) – along the river Aras, and Sodukensk – below it; Sirekan and Sakasensk at the foot of Mounts Sirekan and Sakasensk".

=== Arevik ===
Arevik was the southernmost province of Syunik. The name has ancient origins, likely linked to the Sun god of the tribe of the same name. It is one of the smallest provinces in Syunik, and its territory roughly corresponds to the basin of the Meghri River. In ancient times, Arevik was part of Goghtn, but it later separated and joined Syunik. In 1226, the province was devastated by Emir Harun, who had previously captured Meghri in 1158. Several historical and geographical sites in Arevik are closely tied to the medieval history of Syunik.

=== Kovsakan ===
Kovsakan was also known as Kusakan, Kosakan, or Grham (named after its main fortress). It was primarily located in the basin of the Tsav River and along several right-bank tributaries of the Voghji River, including the Bekh, Vachagan, and Geghanush streams. The most notable site in Kovsakan before the 13th century was the Grham fortress, which existed between the 10th and 12th centuries. This fortress was likely located opposite the Shariblu station of the present-day Kapan-Minjevan railway, on the left bank of the Voghji River.

=== Dzork ===
The province of Dzork stretched across the upper reaches of the Kapan River. Starting from the 11th century, it was renamed Kapan, after the city located there. Dzork is the most mountainous region of Syunik; a significant part of it remains covered by dense forests today. The province was home to several famous medieval monasteries.

=== Baghk ===
Between the 10th and 12th centuries, this province covered a larger area than in ancient times. Baghk was bordered by Kovsakan to the south, Dzork and Tsghukk to the west, Haband to the north, and the Aghavno River to the east. The province was divided into two parts: Western and Eastern Baghk. The exact locations of several historical sites in Baghk, such as the fortresses of Andok, Barkushat, Kashatagh, and Pahu, have not yet been fully clarified.

=== Tsghuk ===
Tsghuk was bordered by Aghahejk and Haband to the east, and by Jahuk and Vayots Dzor to the west (with the border running along the watershed of the Syunik Mountains). The name Tsghukk likely has ethnic origins. Because it served as the residence (vostan) of the princes of Syunik, the province was often called Syunik or Sisakan. The town of Shaghat was the seat of both the Syunian princes and the Bishop of Syunik.

=== Haband ===
In ancient times, the province of Haband was relatively unknown to historians. The Ashkharhatsuyts (Ancient Armenian Geography) mentions two Habands: one in Syunik and the other in Artsakh. An ancient list belonging to the Tatev Monastery records 79 villages in this province. According to tradition, the patriarch Dzagik built a fortress here called Dzagezor (or the Fortress of Haband); the canyon where the fortress stood was subsequently named "Dzagezor" after him.

=== Yernjak ===
This province was located in the basin of the Yernjak River (now Alinja-chay). It was surrounded by the provinces of Goghtn, Tsghukk, Jahuk, and Nakhichevan. Since ancient times, the southern part of Yernjak has been famous for its choice fruits, including apricots, pomegranates, figs, and pears. Regarding the name Yernjak, the historian Orbelian mentions a legend stating that the name originated from a Syunian noblewoman named Yerinjik.

=== Jahuk ===
Jahuk was located northwest of Yernjak. It was bordered by Vayots Dzor and Tsghuk to the north, Yernjak and Nakhichevan to the southeast and south, and the Sharur province of Ayrarat to the west.

=== Aghahejk ===
There is very little information about this province, though it was quite extensive. It was located in the northeastern part of Syunik, bordered by Tsar (in Artsakh) and the Syunik provinces of Tsghukk and Haband. The tax registers of the Bishopric of Tatev mention 43 settlements in Aghahejk.

=== Vayots Dzor ===
Vayots Dzor is one of the most prominent provinces of Syunik. There are numerous references to this region and its landmarks in both Armenian and foreign sources. The geographer Vardan calls it "Yeghegyats Dzor." It is a mountainous, water-rich province with fertile lands. In the middle centuries, the number of settlements in Vayots Dzor reached 91.

=== Gegharkunik ===
The province of Gegharkunik occupied the largest part of the Lake Geghama (Sevan) basin, while the smaller portion consisted of the Sodk province. Gegharkunik was located in the northwestern part of the basin, while Sodk was in the southeast. The name is traditionally associated with the name of Gegham.

=== Sodk ===
Sodk extended along the southeastern and eastern shores of Lake Geghama. Its territory almost entirely coincides with parts of the modern-day Martuni and Vardenis regions. It is a lowland area with fertile soil and cold springs. The gold mines near the Zod Pass have been exploited here since ancient times.

== History ==
=== Ancient Period: Kingdom of Armenia ===
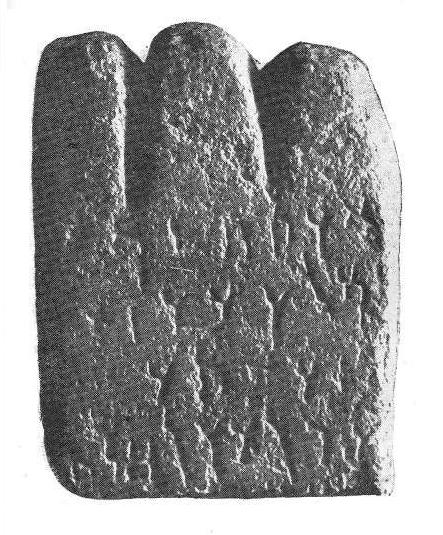
Boundary stone of Artaxias I with an Aramaic inscription found in Syunik

From 189 B.C. onwards, Syunik was part of the Kingdom of Greater Armenia which was ruled by representatives of the Artaxiad dynasty. Inscriptions by King Artashes I have been found on the territory of Syunik.

Starting in at least the 3rd century B.C., Syunik was ruled by representatives of the ancient Armenian Siunia dynasty identifying themselves as descendants of Hayk, the legendary patriarch and founder of the Armenian nation. The story was recounted by Movses Khorenatsi in his 5th-century History of Armenia.

To the east, along the borders of the Armenian language (he appointed) two governors - ten-thousanders - from the noble families of Sisakan and Kadmean (?) ...

— Movses Khorenatsi, History of Armenia

The first known Nakharar ruler was Vaghinak Siak (c. 330) and his successor was his brother Andok or Andovk (Antiochus, c. 340). In 379 Babik (Bagben) the son of Andok was re-established as a Naxarar by the Mamikonian family. Babik had a sister called Pharantzem who had married the Arsacid Prince Gnel, nephew of the Armenian King Arsaces II (Arshak II) and later married Arsaces II as her second husband. Babik's rule lasted for less than ten years and by about 386 or 387, Dara was deposed by the Sassanid Empire. Valinak (c. 400–409) was followed by Vasak (409–452). Vasak had two sons: Babik (Bagben), Bakur and a daughter who married Vasak's successor, Varazvahan (452–472). Varazvahan's son Gelehon ruled from 470–477, who died in 483. Babik (Bagben) the brother of Varazvahan became the new Naxarar in 477. Hadz the brother of Gelehon died on September 25, 482. The Syunik Province was later governed by Vahan (c. 570), Philip (Philipo, c. 580), Stephen (Stephanos, c. 590–597), Sahak (Isaac, c. 597) and Grigor (Gregory, until 640).

Syunik was one of the most powerful houses of nakharars in ancient Armenia. Ancient records which have survived to the present bear vivid evidence. Thus, according to Zoranamak, a state register regulating the quantity and order of military troops in the ancient states, the province of Syunik displayed its cavalry designed for 9,400 chevaliers in wartime. According to Gahnamak, a register of noble families in the ancient Armenian state, the prince of Syunik ranked the first among the Armenian aristocrats in the royal palace.

In the early 4th century, Syunik was Christianized along with the rest of Armenia. The princes of Syunik, together with other Armenian magnates, accompanied Gregory the Illuminator to Caesarea for holy orders.

After the Peace of Acilisene concluded in 387 A.D., Syunik remained part of the vassal Kingdom of Armenia. The division of the Armenian statehood between Byzantine and Persia drastically reduced Armenia's territory. In the second half of the 390s, Mesrop Mashtots, a great Armenian enlightener and scholar, engaged in enlightening Alinja, a gavar in the Syunik province, and after the invention of the Armenian alphabet in 406, he opened the first schools there with the help of princes Vaghinak and Vasak Siwni to teach the new Armenian scripts to his apprentices.

Afterwards, he left for Syunakan, a region bordering on (Goghtn). There he received the God-loving and docile acceptance of Vaghinak, the prince of Syunik. While travelling across the province, he (Mashtots) benefited from his great assistance in the realization of the task set before him.

— Koryun, The Life of Mashtots

There are also available records left by Stephen Orbelian, an historian of Syunik.

After the dissolution of the Kingdom of Armenia in 428 A.D, Syunik was integrated into Sasanian Armenia in the Marzpanate period. The Sasanians appointed Prince Vasak Siwni as the ruler of the entire Armenian state. During the 451 Battle of Avarayr, Vasak Siwni failed to stand up for the defense of the Armenian troops led by Vardan Mamikonian and took sides with the Persians, his move predetermining the adversary's victory. It was apparently from that moment on that the Siwnis committed themselves also to the defense of the Derbent fortress, thereby reinforcing the positions of the princes of Syunik.

=== 6th–9th centuries ===
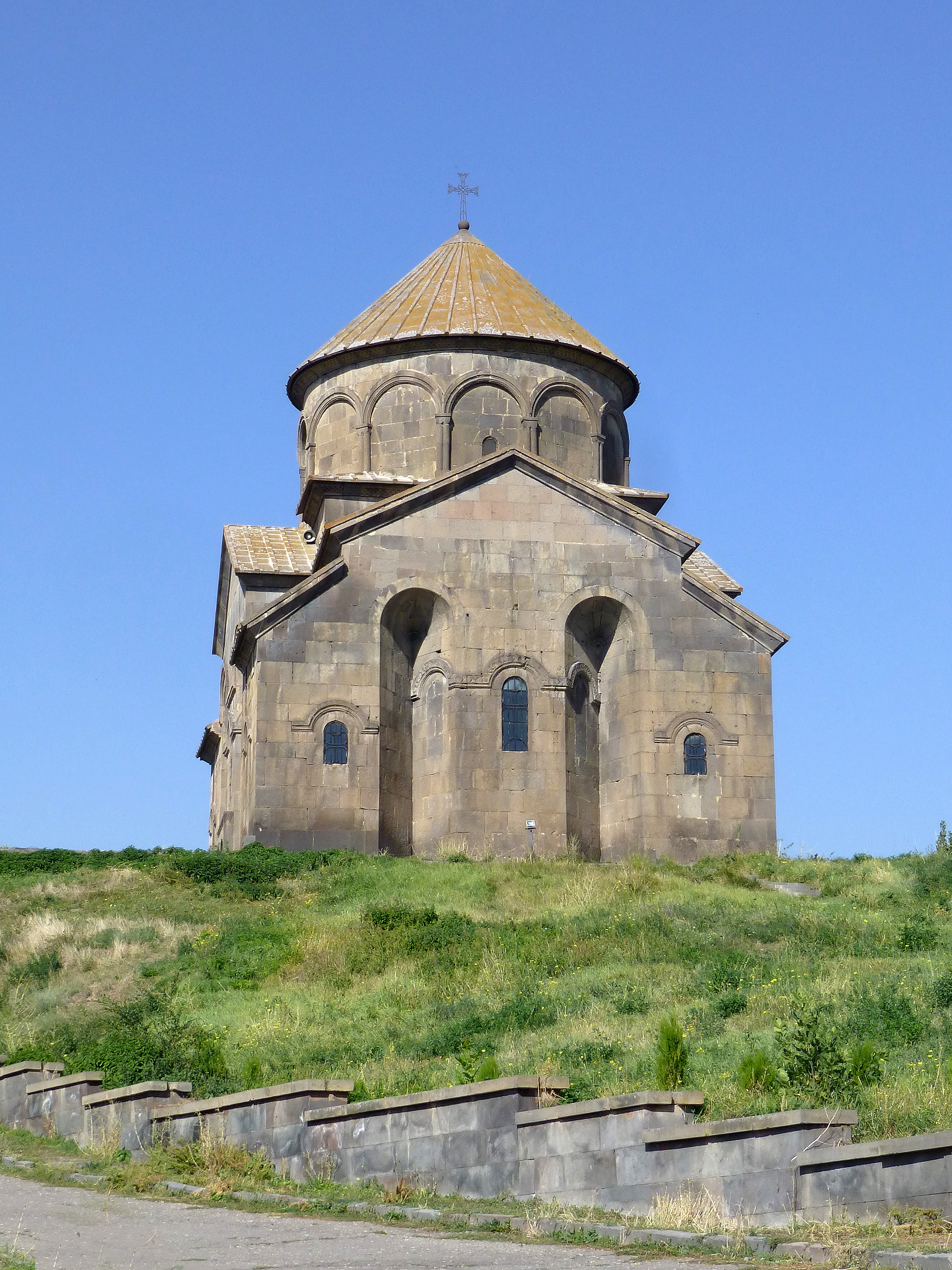
Saint Gregory Church, Sisian, 7th century

The princes descending from the Siunia dynasty were among the more influential Armenian kingdoms. Movses Khorenatsi localizes the royal family's possessions "at the eastern end, along the borders of the Armenian language". Stephen Syunetsi, a local scholar and a theologian, left records about the Syunik dialect of the Armenian language at the close of the 7th century.

It is also important to know all the regional dialects of one's own language ... of both Ispir and Syunik and Artsakh in addition to classical Armenian (middle and central) ...

— Stephen Syunetsi, Interpretation of Grammar

After the Byzantine-Sasanian peace pact in 591, Syunik, along with several other regions of Armenia, was recognized as part of the Sasanian Dynasty.

With the onset of the Arab invasion in the early 8th century, the Armenian Syunik, along with Eastern Georgia and the territory of the former Sasanian Albania, was integrated into one of the regions of Armaniya, a vicegerency also known as Ostikanate of Arminiya.

From 821 onwards, a larger part of Syunik belonged to Vasak Siwni, who ruled the province in the status of a protector. Later the same year, Syunik was invaded by the Arab forces; however, Prince Vasak managed to clear the region of Arabs by seeking aid from Babak Khorramdin, the Khurramites' leader. The subsequent war with the Khurramites (826–827) left the gavars of Balk (south of Syunik) and Gegharkunik (vicinity of Lake Sevan) devastated. After Vasak Siwni's demise, his sons, Philip and Sahak, ruled the province. The former became the ruler of Eastern Syunik and Vayots Dzor and the latter the ruler of Western Syunik and the founder of the family of Haykazuns (who reigned over Gegharkunik).

Between 831–832 Syunik was involved in the rebellions against the Arab vicegerent, Hall. In 853 the province was invaded by Bugha al-Kabir, an Arab commander; Princes Vasak Ishkhanik and Ashot were taken captive and sent to Samarra. Before Vasak Ishkanik's return, the sovereign of Gegharkunik was Vasak Gabur. "At that time, Ishkhanats Ishkhan (Prince of Princes) Ashot appointed Vasak Haykazn (also known as Gabur) the Prince of Syunik, giving him a royal honor ...".

In the run-up to the rebellion by the centralized Armenian state, Syunik was one of the three major political units of Armenia (along with the Artsruni and Bagratuni dynasties).

=== Bagratid Armenia: Kingdom of Syunik ===
Bagratuni Armenia circa 1000

The Siunia dynasty supported Ashot I upon ascension to the throne, recognizing his reign over Syunik. In 875 B.C., Grigor Supan II and Vasak Ishkhanik took part in the assembly of the Armenian intellectuals convened upon the initiative of George II of Armenia (who proposed the Khalif to bring Ashot II to the Armenian throne). Vasak Ishkhanik acknowledged the Vassal dependence on Ashot Bagratuni, the Prince of Princes. In an early X century record, Hovhannes Draskhanakerttsi wrote:

However, Vasak, the great prince of Syunik diminutively referred to as Ishkhanik (little prince), obeyed the Prince of Princes, Ashot with an irrevocable discretion, tacit modesty and totally of his own will. He closely heeded his advice in just the same way as he respected the law, keeping it all in his heart.

— Hovhannes Draskhanakerttsi, History of Armenia

In 885, Syunik formed part of Bagratid Armenia. An early 10th-century Arab author, Istakhri, referred to the place name Sisijan, which he said was situated on the roadway connecting Bardva with Dvin (the Armenian Highlands, the kingdom of Smbat and Ashot I). Byzantine Emperor Constantine VII Porphyrogenitus addressed his officials letters "to the Prince of Syne, Armenia; to the Prince of Vaitzor, Armenia".

In the early 10th century, the sovereigns of Syunik attempted to take possession of Nakichivan, the neighboring gavar. In 904, King Smbat I, in an attempt to undermine the princedom of Vaspurakan, handed over Nakhichivan to Syunik. Upon the demand of the Artsrunis, the rulers of Vaspurakan at the time, the Sajid emir, Yusuf, attacked Armenia in 909 and, devastating settlements and fortresses across Syunik, annexed Alinja to his possessions.

After the death of sovereign Ashot, (ca. 909), Syunik was divided into two princedoms between his sons. Prince Smbat came into possession of Western Syunik (Chaguk) and his brother, Sahak of the eastern part, the region of Balk along the river Akera. During the reign of King Ashot II, the northern part of Syunik – along Lake Sevan (to the north of Vardenis ridge) – was united to the estates of the Bagratid family.

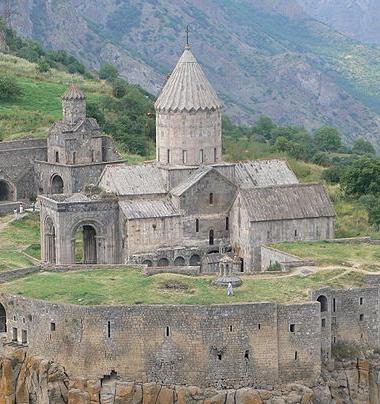
Tatev monastery, 9th–13th centuries

From 970 until 980 the political center of the province extended to the south of the gavar of Balk, with the rights of the sovereign being bestowed upon Prince Smbat (the grandson of Ashot Siwni). The latter, taking advantage of the undermined Armenian statehood, in 978 proclaimed Syunik an independent kingdom. "They crowned Smbat, the Armenian and the superb husband, the paramount leader of Syunik," Stephen Orbelian writes. A year later, however, he had to acknowledge the vassal dependence upon the Bagratid Armenia. Both before and after the formation of the vassal Kingdom of Syunik, the paramount leaders of the region took part in all the politico-military actions of the Armenian statehood (974, 998, 1003, 1040), remaining true to the Bagratids' allies. In the early 990s, King Gagik I annexed the sovereign possession of Vayots Dzor while uniting Armenian lands under a centralized authority and a range of other Syunik regions to the Ani Kingdom. The records of Stephen Taronetsi, a contemporary historian, state:

Sembat's brother, Gagik, was enthroned in the city of Ani the very day he [the king] died in the winter of 989 A.D.

— Stephen Taronetsi, General History

The Kingdom of Syunik reached its peak in the first half of the 11th century under Kings Vasak and Smbat II, achieving sovereignty with the fall of the Kingdom of Ani in 1045. Despite the Seljuk invasions led by Arp Aslan in the mid-11th century, Syunik, along with Tashir, remained invincible unlike most other regions of Armenia. After death of Grigor I (about 1072), the last remaining heir to the throne, Senekerim, became the King of Syunik, his authority being affirmed by Sultan Malik Shah I of the Seljuk Empire. Shortly afterwards, however, Senekerim was killed, presumably by the Emir of the Shaddadids. The latter, according to a medieval historian "cheated the Armenian king into death, seizing the land of Syunik". Afterwards, the territory of Syunk, like a range of other regions of Armenia, passed, little by little, under Seljuk control. In early 1103, the Seljuks, led by Chortman, destroyed Kapan, the kingdom's capital city. In 1104, they invaded the fortress of Vorotan and a year later Bghen. Below are Stephen Orbelian's recounts of the events:

A thick fog broke over the Armenian nation. All the churches of Armenia and Christianity plunged into mourning, Yet, Baghaberd, Geghi, Kakaverd, Shlorut, Karchavavan, Meghri and Krkham remained untouched thanks to the grandsons of Ashot, King Grigor, and Smbat.

— Stephen Orbelian, History of Sisakan Region

In 1126, Kapan and the region of Arevik were devastated by the troops of Amir Kharon. In 1152, the Seljuks invaded the Fortress of Shlorut, and in 1157 the Fortress of Meghri. Between 1166 and 1169, Shams al-Din Ildeniz, Eldigüz, the Seljuk atabek at the time, annexed the fortresses of Grgham, Geghi, Kakavaberd and Kanots to his possessions. In 1170, Baghaberd was invaded, with over 10,000 Armenian manuscripts being burnt, thereby closing the chapter on the Armenian Kingdom of Syunik. "Thus, also that candlestick was extinguished there, marking the beginning of the Persian reign", writes Vardan Areveltsi, a 13th-century Armenian historian.

The Seljuk raids had a crucial impact on the Armenian ethnicity. Before the Seljuk invasion, Syunik had an estimated 1,000 settlements, whereas in the late 13th century, the number was reduced by a third.

=== Syunik Principality: Armenia in the 13th–15th centuries ===
From the 12th century onwards, the Armenian intellectual elite, uniting its efforts with the Georgian Kingdom and relying on the Armenian population's support, embarked on the expulsion of the Sekjuks form Eastern Armenia and the major part of Central Armenia. As early as in 1196, Gegharkunik was liberated. In 1211, Armenian-Georgian troops, led by Zakare and Ivane Zakaryan, liberated the entire Syunik from the Seljuk yoke. A historian of Syunik, Stephen Orbelian, left the following record in the 13th century: "They made enormous efforts to liberate our country, Armenia, from the Persian yoke ... in 660 (1211), they liberated Syunik, Vorotan and Bkhen." Kirakos Gandzaketsi, another historian of the same century, adds:

... they stood out with a great valor during the battles. They conquered and seized most of the Armenian regions under Persian and Muslim control - gavars located around the Gagarkuni sea, Tashir, Ayrarat, the city of Bjni, Dvin, Anberd, the city of Ani, Kars and Vayots Dzor, the region of Syunik and the fortresses nearby, as well as towns and gavars.

— Kirakos Gandzaketsi, History of Armenia

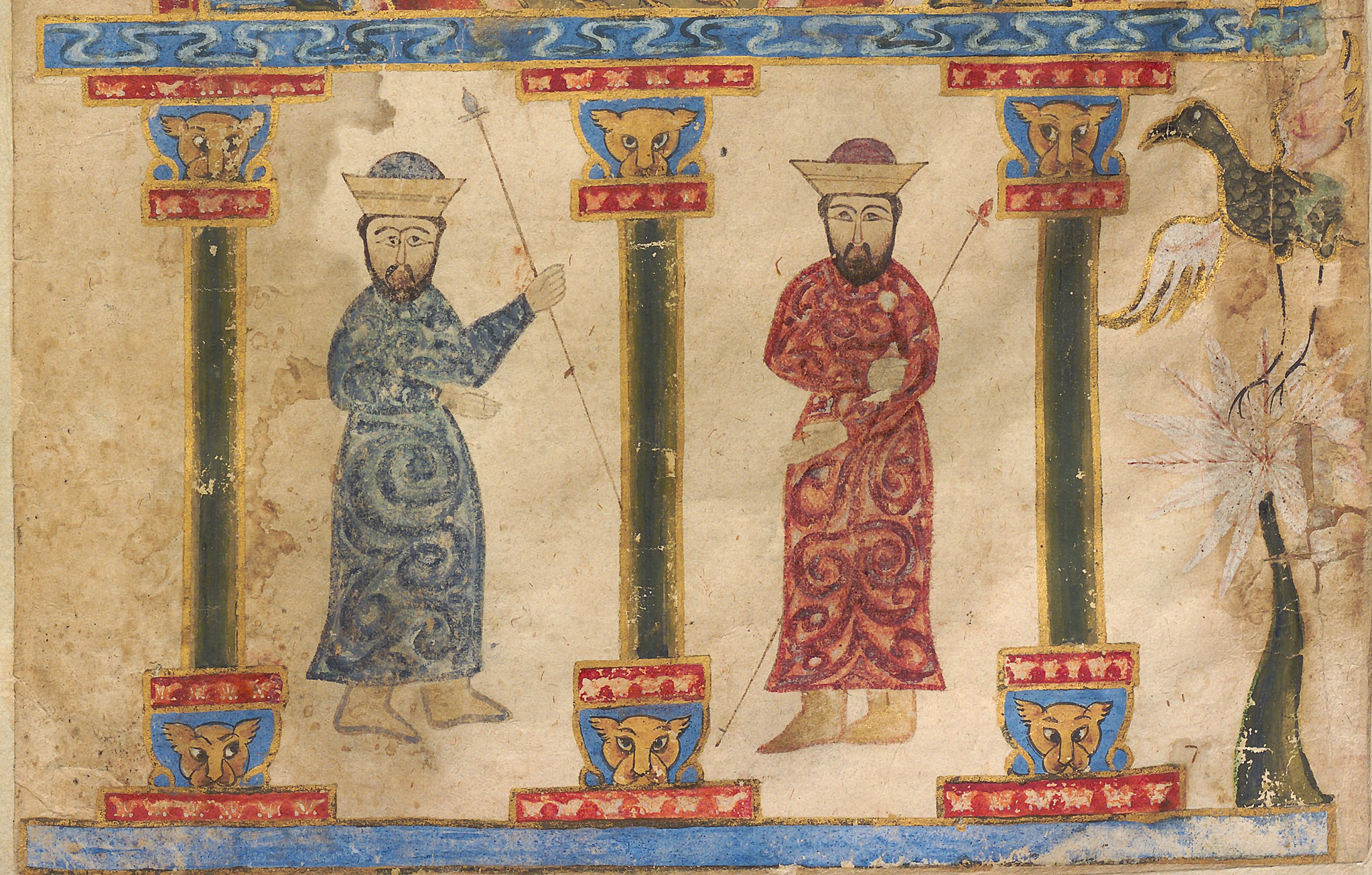
Princes Bughta and Burtel Orbelians, 1306

Two princedoms – the Orbelians and Proshians (Khaghabakyans) (formerly the Zakaryans' vassals) – were formed there after the region's liberation. The founders of those dynasties received their possessions for merits in the war against the Seljuks. The Orbelians in Syunik traced their ancestral roots to Liparit, Elikum's son, while Vasak descended from the from Khakhbakyan dynasty who came from the neighboring Armenian region of Khachen. As recounted by Kirakos, a 13th-century historian, "They were natives of Khachen, people of noble origin. adherents of the Christian creed and Armenians by nationality". Enthroned in Syunik, the Orbelians were among the influential princedoms of Armenia. Their liberation from the Seljuk hegemony contributed to the cultural development of the district. The Proshyans extended their authority mainly to the Gavars of Gegharkunik in the south-west of Lake Sevan, and Vayots Dzor, holding their residence in the small city of Srkghunk. In 1236, both dynasties were forced to recognize the Mongol authority over them (after the latter's invasion of Armenian lands). In 1251, Smbat Orbelian obtained the right inju from the Mongol royal palace. Those rights were retained also by Hulagu Khan and his successors. The lands under Stephen Orbelyan's control extended to the borders of Nakhichivan and those owned by the younger branch of the princedom covered the shore of Sevan. Thanks to the rulers, as well as the right to immunity, the conditions in that part of Armenia were relatively tolerable, which in turn promoted economic and cultural life across the region. A glaring example is the most prominent institution of higher learning of the time, the University of Gladzor, which functioned here. Meantime, the region also became the main stronghold of the national and state establishment across the entire territory of historical Armenia where the Armenian state anatomy was still preserved.

Smbat's successor, Tarsaich Orbelian (1273–1290) concentrated in his hands the entire province, including Vayots Dzor and Gegharkunik. Under Elikum Orbelian (1290–1300), relative peace dominated Syunik as opposed to the other regions of Armenia. His heir, Prince Burtel (ca. 1300–1344), reigned over the region for more than four decades, bringing his contribution to its cultural development.

Tokhtamysh, who attacked Armenia in 1380, captivated tens of thousands of Armenians from Syunik, Artsakh and Parskahayk, while just a few years later – in 1387 – Syunik was invaded by Tamerlan. Nevertheless, at the close of the 15th century, the province was among the remaining semi-autonomous Armenian princedoms still populated by the local Armenian feudal intelligentsia.

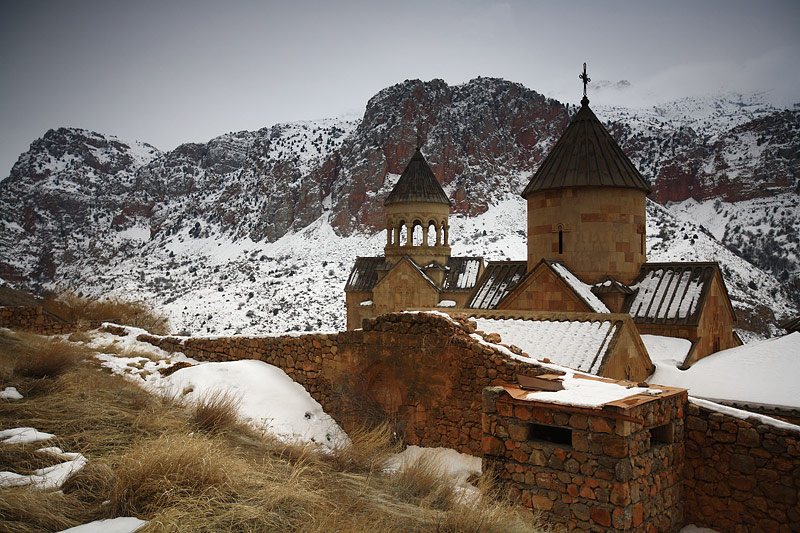
Noravank, Surb Karapet Church, 1216–1227

In 1403, the Princes Smbat and Burtel were captured and exiled to Samarkand. However, they were liberated soon and re-appointed as the rules of the lands under their control. In that period, Syunik fell under the power of Qara Qoyunlus (Black Sheep Turkomans), a united Turkish nomadic tribe who were later replaced by the Aq Qoyunlu rulers. The invasion of Mongol ilkhans, especially the Qara Koyunlu and Ak Qoyunlu tribes, had severe consequences: with the powerful forces disintegrated, a part of the population was looted and annihilated, and cultural monuments were destroyed. The local population was robbed of its lands which later became home to the nomad re-settlers; a part of the Armenian population was forced into exile from the historic homeland.

In 1410, Qara Yusuf, the Qara Qoyunlu leader, appropriated Smbat Orbelian's possessions, forcing the latter to flee to Georgia with his sons Ivane, Beshken and Shah. In 1417, Ivane and Pashken were re-appointed as rulers of the lands under their control. According to Tovmen Motspatsi, a contemporary historian who served as the main Armenian source of that particular period, the early years of the Qara Qoyunlu rule were relatively peaceful. That quiet period, however, was disrupted by the arrival of Iskandar who turned Armenia into a "desert", "devastating and looting" the country. Nevertheless, Isander Khan also made attempts of reconciliation with the feudals and the clergy. Thus he adopted the title of Shah-i-Armen (King of Armenians), as well as appointed an ethnic Armenian advisor, Rustam, who was Prince Beshken Orbelian's son. Between 1425 and 1430, Rustam was the governor of Ayrarat, with Yerevan being the center of the province. His authority extended to Syunik which was ruled by his father (still holding the title of "prince of princes").

However, in 1435, as Shah Rukh launched his third raid against the Qara Qoyunlu; Syunik was devastated, and Beshken, with 6,000 liegemen, had to flee to Georgia, having received the Armenian region of Lori from Alexander, his father-in-law.

... The king, hypocritically offering him honor, handed over the Lori Fortress to him. Pious and theopathetic, he established orders with love and similarly treated the poor with love, offering his appeals and gathering them all. He showed reverence and supplied bread, food and clothing to all [the representatives] of the Armenian nation who turned to him for help. The bloodthirsty and ruthless beast, [King Alexan], out of fear - stemming from vain and false suspicions lest all the Armenians head towards his palace in a crowded march eventually leading up to the devastation of all the regions of Iberia (heard especially from the mouths of evil Ishkhans /princes/), gave him poison through an Armenian's husband...

— Thomas of Metsoph, The History of Lenk Temur And His Successors

Under the next Qara Qoyunlu leader, Jahan Shah (reign: 1436–1467), the feudals of Syunik and Vayots Dzor obtained control over several regions and were even granted permission to use the title ishkhan. In the meantime, Jahan Shah sought the Armenians' support in the fight against his enemies. Yet those princes no longer enjoyed great authority. After Jahan Shah's death, the Qara Qoyunlus' possessions passed under the control of their main rivals, the united nomadic tribes identifying themselves as Aq Qoyunlu (White Sheep Turkomans). In 1501, the Aq Qoyunlus' state was overtaken by the Qizilbash led by Ismail Safavid, the founder of the Safavid Persia (which gained control over all the territorial conquests by the Aq Qoyunlus).

=== 16th—18th centuries։ National liberation movements ===
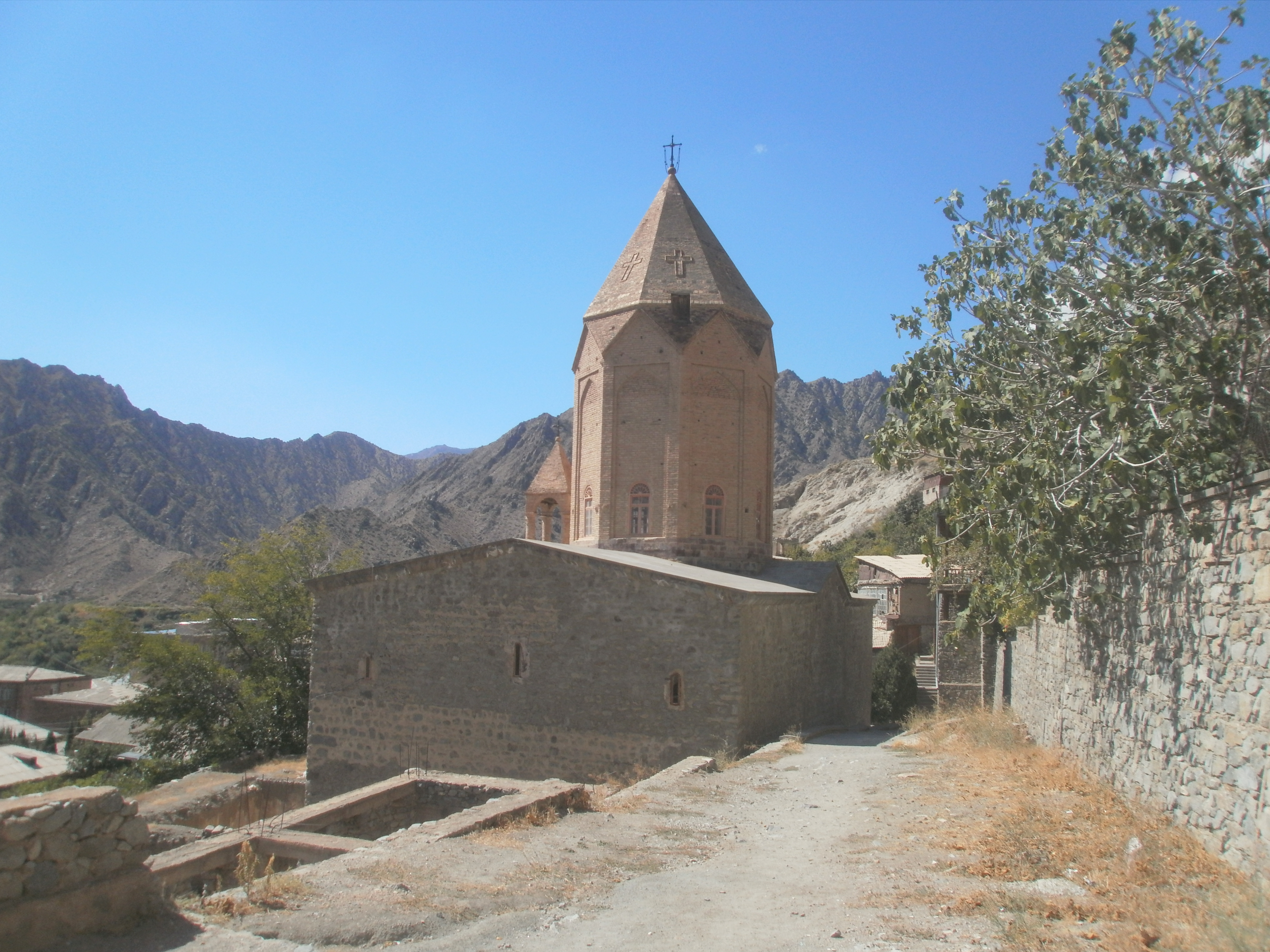
Holy Mother of God Church in Meghri, consecrated in 1673

Due to the Ottoman expansion spanning from the 16th century until the first half of the 18th century, Armenia and the adjacent regions repeatedly became an arena of war between the Ottoman Empire and Iran. The 1555 Peace Treaty of Amasya, which ended the four-decade-long war, redefined Eastern Armenia as part of the Safavid dynasty. In 1590, it passed under Ottoman control but was returned to the Safavids in 1639 subject to the terms of the Qasr-e-Shirin Treaty.

Between the 16th and 17th centuries, the Armenian feudal possessions, i.e. the Melikdoms, were preserved in Syunik and the neighboring Nagorno-Karabakh (with their own armed squadrons) despite the Muslim tribes which had settled on the territory of Eastern Armenia. The most outstanding among them included those owned by Melik-Shahnazar in Gegharkunik, Melik Haykaz in Kashatagh, and Melik-Safraz in Angeghakot.

In the early 17th century, Persian King Abbas the Great (Shah Abbas) populated the lands between Artsakh (Nagorno-Karabakh) and Syunik with Kurdish tribes (with a goal of undermining and disengaging the regions under the Armenian meliks' rule). When Shah Abbas dispossessed a population of 250,000 during the 1604 Great Sürgün, the residents of Syunik were also deported. A contemporary of the events, Arakel of Tabriz, makes the following remark in a 17th-century record:

... he turned Armenia into an uninhabited [desert]. For upon resettlement, he exiled to Persia [residents] of not just a few but a vast number of Gavars, starting from the borders of Nakhivivan and reaching the Geghama coasts, the gavars of Lori, Hamzachiman and Aparan through Yeghegnadzor ...

— Arakel of Tabriz, Book of Histories

In the period between the 17th and 18th centuries, the south of Syunik – Zangezur – became a center of the Armenian people's struggle for national liberation. The meliks of Syunik took part in the 1677 Echmiadzin assembly aimed at organizing the struggle for the liberation of Armenia. In 1699, Melik Israel Ori, the son of the Melik Israel of Syunik, organized a secret assembly in Angheghakot, bringing together 11 meliks. They adopted an appeal to a range of Western European countries with a request for help in the Armenian national liberation movement. Israel Ori was the first leader to opt for a Russian orientation. In 1701, he headed to Moscow to introduce to King Peter I his consideration on the liberation of Armenia (with the engagement of the armed formations of Syunik and Artsakh, as well as Russian support) and gain promises of a collaboration. In 1711, Israel Ori died without carrying his task to completion (see also Persian Campaign of Peter the Great between, 1722–1723).

In 1722, the Armenians of Syunik rebelled against the Persian yoke. The uprising was led by David Bek who liberated the region's south, including the city of Kapan. Also part of the Nakhichivan was liberated in the rebellion; in particular, David Bek seized the village Agulis. In the meantime, he also led successful battles against the Ottoman troops attempting to seize control over the region in the period between 1725 and 1727. Of especially great significance was the 1727 victory near Halidzor. The same year, the Safavids also recognized David Bek's authority over the region, with the military leader himself gaining the right to mint coins. Sometime later, however, the strife among the heads of the movement caused some of them to enter into negotiations with the Turkish authorities under the leadership of priest Ter-Avetis. The developments eventually led to the handover of Halidzor to the Turks. After David Bek's death in 1728, Mkhitar Sparapet took over the campaign for independence, managing to gain control over the town of Ordubad. Two years later – in 1730 – the Armenian military leader was killed, and the Armenians' uprising for Syunik gradually appeared at a low ebb. After accession to power in the 1730s, Nader Shah recognized the semi-autonomous status of the meliks of Syunik and Karabakh.

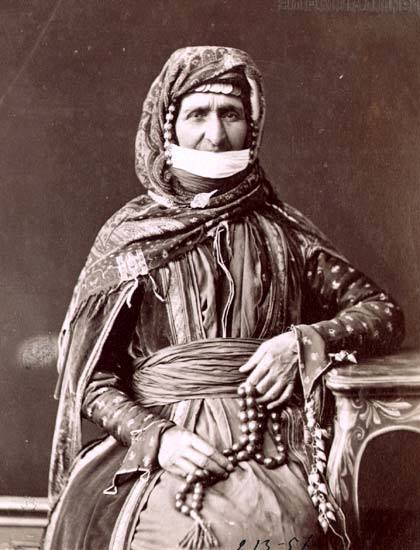
Armenian elderly woman Syunik, around 1900

From the 17th to the 18th centuries, the territory of historical Syunik fell within the boundaries of different territorial-administrative units: the coast of Lake Sevan formed part of Chokhur-e Sa'd. In the second half of the 18th century, Vayots-Dzor, Chakhuk, Shahaponk and Alinja were annexed to the Tabriz Khanate to later become part of the Khanate of Nakhichivan. Arevik, Tghuk, Aghaechk and Aband were incorporated into the wilayah of Karabakh, with Dzork, Bal and Arevik forming part of Tabriz. From the mid-18th century onwards, the coast of Sevan was within the boundaries of the Erivan Khanate and southern Syunik within the boundaries of the Karabakh Khanate.

=== 19th and early 20th centuries ===
Under the 1805 Treaty of Kurakchay, Zangezur was integrated into the Russian Empire, gaining independence from Persia. From that moment on, also regions to the north-east of Lake Sevan (de jure, starting from 1813, i.e. after the entry into force of the Treaty of Gulistan). After the 1826–1828 Russo-Persian War, Eastern Armenia entirely passed under Russian control. In the 1830s, the western regions of Syunik (Gegharkunuk, Sotk, Vayots-Dzor, Chakhuk, Shahaponk, Alinja) were incorporated into the Armenian Oblast, while the eastern regions became part of the Karabakh province. Despite the centuries-long expulsions and deportations, the Armenians remained a majority population in Syunik. After the formation of the Erivan Governorate, several regions of Syunik (Gelakunik, Sotk, Vayots-Dzor, Chakhuk, Sahapon, Alinka, Dzork, Balk, Arevik and part of Kovsakan) formed part of the province. Tsghuk, Shahaponl and the rest of Kovsakan were integrated into the Shamakhi Governorate. Between the late 19th and early 20th centuries, the regions to the west of the Zangezur Mountains formed part of the Erivan Governorate, with those in the eastern part being on the territory of the Elisabethpol Governorate (Zangezur Uyezd).

=== After the October Revolution ===
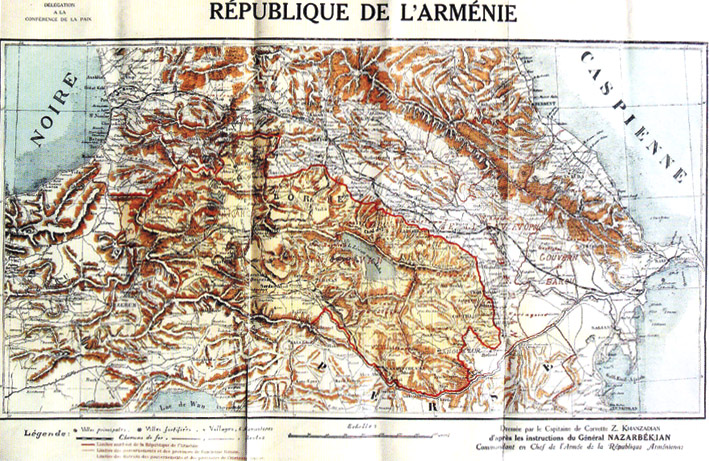
First Republic of Armenia, 1919

In September 1919, Garegin Nzhdeh and Poghos Ter-Davtyan were appointed respectively as the defense chiefs of southern and northern Zangezur (Kapan and Sisian). In November, the Armenian troops managed to halt the Azerbaijanis' attack and launched a subsequent counterattack. On August 10, 1920, an agreement proposing the Red Army's control over the disputed regions (including Zangezur) was concluded between the Russian Soviet Federative Socialist Republic (RSFSR) and the Republic of Armenia. Nzhdeh and Ter-Davtyan did not recognize the accord and organized a partisan battle against the Red Army and the Turkish defense units allying with the latter (Ter-Davtyan died shortly afterwards, with Nzhdeh alone concentrating in his hands the military command in Zangezur). In early October, a mass rebellion broke out in Zangezur, leading to the region's full liberation by late November. A congress held in the Tatev Monastery on December 25, 1920, proclaimed the "Autonomous Republic of Syunik", with Nzhdeh being its de facto leader and accepting the ancient title of sparapet (military leader). As a result, Nzhdeh extended his authority also to a part of Nagorno-Karabakh, uniting with the rebels there. On April 27, 1921, the Republic of Mountainous Armenia was proclaimed, with Nzdeh holding different government posts, including that of the prime minister, defense minister and minister of foreign affairs. On July 1, Mountainous Armenia was renamed the Republic of Armenia as the successor of the First Republic. Simon Vratsian, formerly the prime minister of the short-lived independent state, was declared its prime minister.

The Red Army troops soon went on the offensive, and on July 9, Nzhdeh, obtaining the guarantees of Soviet Armenia's leadership (regarding the maintenance of Syunik as part of Armenia), headed to Iran with the remaining rebels.

=== Soviet and post-Soviet eras ===
After the fall of the rebellious state of Zagezur, Syunik was incorporated into the Armenian Soviet Socialist Republic, and some time later, and certain parts of historical Syunik – the territories of Chakhuk and Alinja – into the Nakhichivan Autonomous Republic. The Soviet years marked a boom era in the region. The Zangezur Copper and Molybdenum Combine was founded in the town of Kajaran.

After the re-establishment of Armenia's independence in 1991, the marzes (provinces) were formed in the Armenian part of the historical province: Syunik, Vayots-Dzor and Gegharkunik. In the period of the Nagorno-Karabakh war, Syunik was in the zone of the Armenian-Azerbaijani conflict. The region presently stands out especially with its developing tourism; particularly, in 2010, Wings of Tatev, the world's longest cableway so far, was launched in Syunik. Also Jermuk, a popular mountain spa town, is situated here. The Iran-Armenia gas pipeline, a strategic underground communication channel, runs across the province.

== Cultural life ==
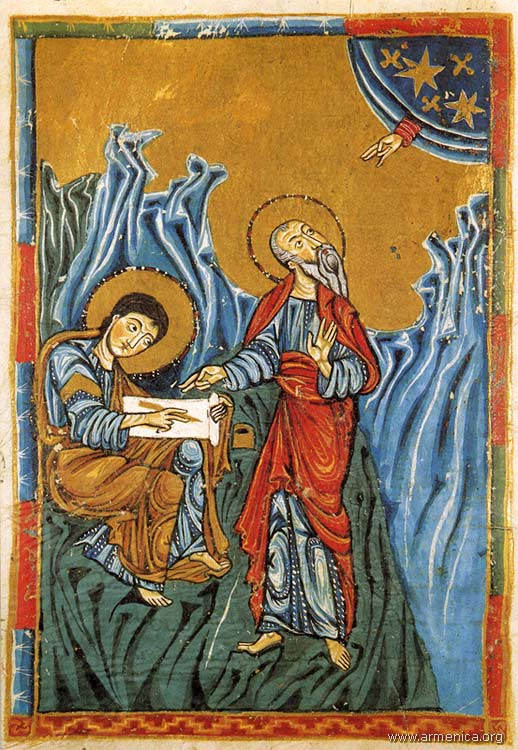
Gladzor School of Miniature, Toros Taronetsi, 1318

Syunik was one of the cultural centers of Medieval Armenia. It is where Mesrop Mashtots, a prominent medieval Armenian scholar, practiced enlightenment in the late 9th and early 10th centuries. Also the Seminary of Syunik, a distinguished institution of the time (from the 8th century onwards, part of the Mekenis monastery, Sotk), was founded in the province. Many outstanding representatives of Armenian culture were born in Syunik. Stephen Syunetsi (I), a historian and a hymnographer, has been known since the 5th century. The province was also home to Petros Syunetsi, Matusagh and Stephen Syunetsi, who lived here in the 6th, 7th and 8th centuries, respectively. The episcopacy of Syunik which, since the reign of Catholicos Nerses IV the Gracious has enjoyed the status of a metropolitan area with 12 subordinate episcopacies, played a paramount role in the history of the Armenian Church. The metropolitan of Syunik held the title of a "protofrontes" of Greater Armenia. A historian of Syunik, Bishop Stephen Orbelian, provides the following characterization of its jurisdictions:

the boundaries of the parishional regions subject to him were as follows: Syunik, Baghk, Arevik, Ordvat, Argulik, Vanand, Alinja, Nakhichivan, Jugha (up to the boundaries of the river Yeraskh, Chakhuk, Vayots-Dzor, Gegharkunik ... the entire territory of Porakn which provoked many disagreements yet received the Armenian catholicoses' acceptance, albeit highly indignant. Also the borders with Aluank are determined: Rambadzor, Zar and Agaech (?) through which the Hakari river runs, stretching to Karavazin ....

— Stephen Orbelian, History of Sisakan region

In 895 a higher education institution under the Tatev Monastery was established, becoming initially famed as a key cultural center of pan-Armenian importance. In the 10th and 11th centuries, Armenian culture experienced the most liberal ever period of its development in Syunik – and the rest of the Armenian states – since the 5th century. The relative political calm in the province in the late 8th and early 14th centuries, increased Syunik's prominence as the main cultural and intellectual center of Armenia at the time. A distinguished educational institution since the 1280s, the University of Gladzor situated in Vayots-Dzor reached the peak of its prosperity under Burtel Orbelian in the early 14th century.It was the most famous Armenian monastic center of the time, which also preserved the traditions of the Armenian monophysistic culture. The university attracted young people from across Armenia who came there to study. Among the outstanding students of the institution were Stephen Orbelian, the historian of Syunik and the author of History of the Province of Sisakan, architect Momik, miniature artists Toros Taronetsi and Tiratur Kilikietsi, theologian Mkhitar Sasnetsi and others. In 1373, a student of University of Gladzor, Hovan Vorotnetsi, founded the University of Tatev (14th–15th centuries) which later became home to Grigor Tatevatsi (1346–1409 or 1410), a distinguished medieval scholar who carried out his creative activity there. The Monastery of Tatev is also known as an intellectual center of medieval Armenia as it housed a large library and developed the school of Armenian miniature art.

Numerous Armenian manuscripts, including "The Testament of Gladzor", are known as prominent samples of national script art originated in Syunik. The school of fine arts (Syunik school) representing monuments of architecture and stone ornamentations, developed in the Vayots Dzor between the 13th and 14th centuries, also becoming famed for its illuminated manuscripts. Syunik was a major center of creative art in early 14th-century Armenia. One of the most ancient illuminated manuscripts, the Gospel Book dating from 989, was written in the Monastery of Noravank.

Among the best known architectural monuments are Tatev (895–906), Noravank (13th–14th centuries), Vahanavank (911), Makenis (10th century), Bgheno-Noravank (11th century), Sisavan (7th century), Vorotnavank (9th–11th centuries), and Zorats (14th century). In the late 13th century, Stephen Orbelian compiled a long list of the monasteries in that part of Armenia.

== Famous Figures ==
- Vaghinak Syuni — State and military figure of Greater Armenia, early 4th century.
- Andovk Syuni — State and military figure of Greater Armenia, mid-4th century.
- Parandzem — Queen of Armenia, wife of Arshak II (350–368).
- Hovsep Vayotsdzoretsi — Catholicos of All Armenians (440–454).
- Vasak Syuni (5th century) — Statesman, Marzban (Governor) of Armenia (442–451).
- Stepanos Syunetsi (5th century) — Grammarian/rhetorician (Kertogh), hymnographer.
- Petros Syunetsi (6th century) — Bibliographer, chronicler/historian.
- Stepanos Syunetsi (6th–8th centuries) — Grammarian, poet.
- Sahakdukht (8th century) — Musician, poetess.
- Mashtots I Yeghivardetsi — Catholicos of All Armenians (897–898).
- Vahan I Syunetsi — Catholicos of All Armenians (968–969).
- Mesrop Vayotsdzoretsi (10th century) — Ecclesiastical writer.
- Grigor Tuteordi (12th–13th centuries) — Ecclesiastical figure.
- Stepanos Orbelian (13th century) — Historian, ecclesiastical figure.
- Momik (13th–14th centuries) — Architect, miniaturist, sculptor.
- Hovhan Vorotnetsi (14th century) — Philosopher, educator.
- Arakel Syunetsi (14th–15th centuries) — Poet, philosopher.
- Movses III Tatevatsi (Syunetsi) — Catholicos of All Armenians (1629–1632).
- Yeremia Meghretsi (17th century) — Linguist, lexicographer.
- Israel Ori — Figure of the national liberation movement (1690–1711).
- Davit Bek — Leader of the Syunik liberation struggle (1720s).
- Petros Ghapantsi — 18th-century poe

== See also ==
- Kingdom of Armenia (antiquity)
- Kingdom of Artsakh
- Zangezur
- Vayots dzor
- Gegharkunik

== Gallery ==
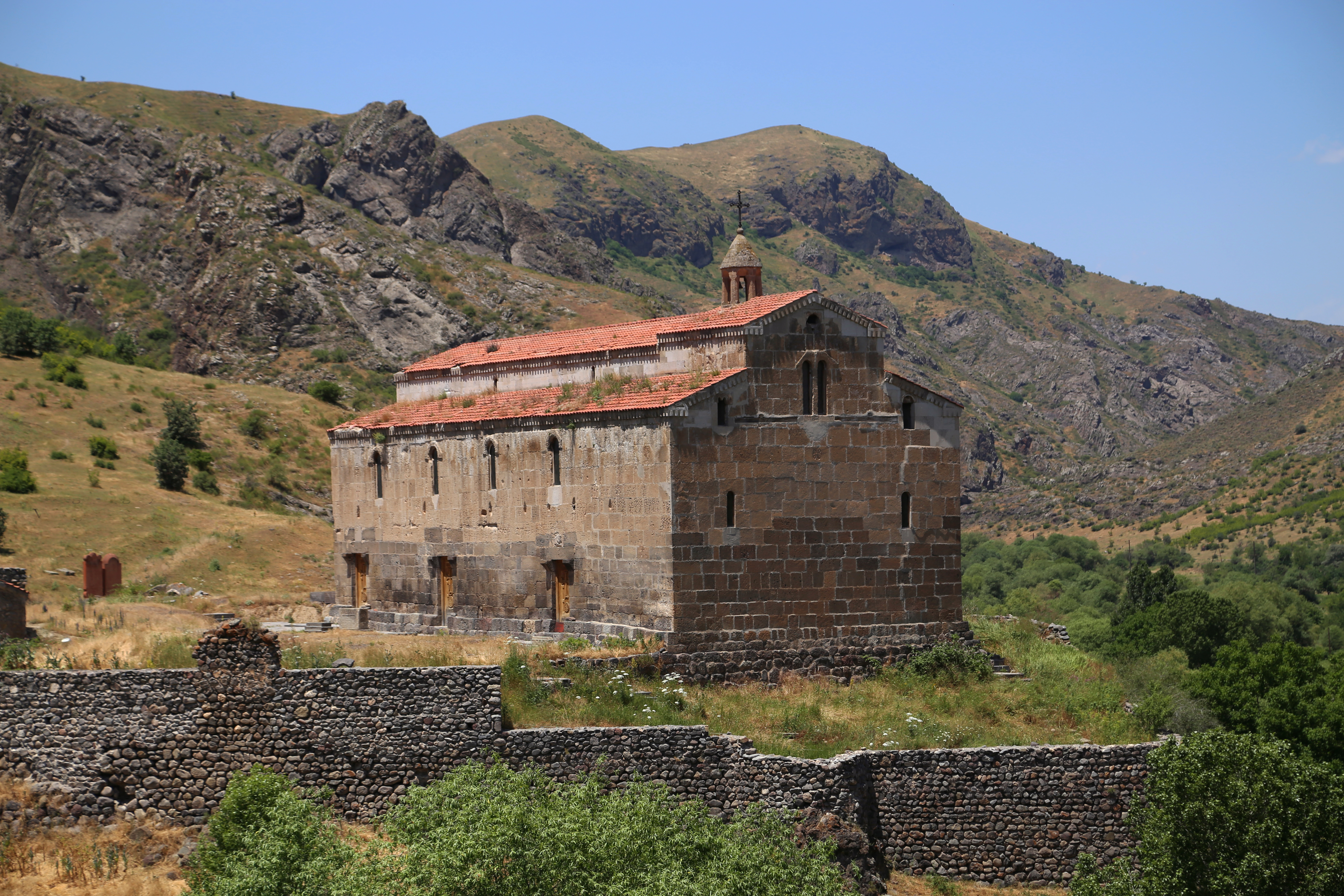
Tsitsernavank Monastery, 4th–6th centuries

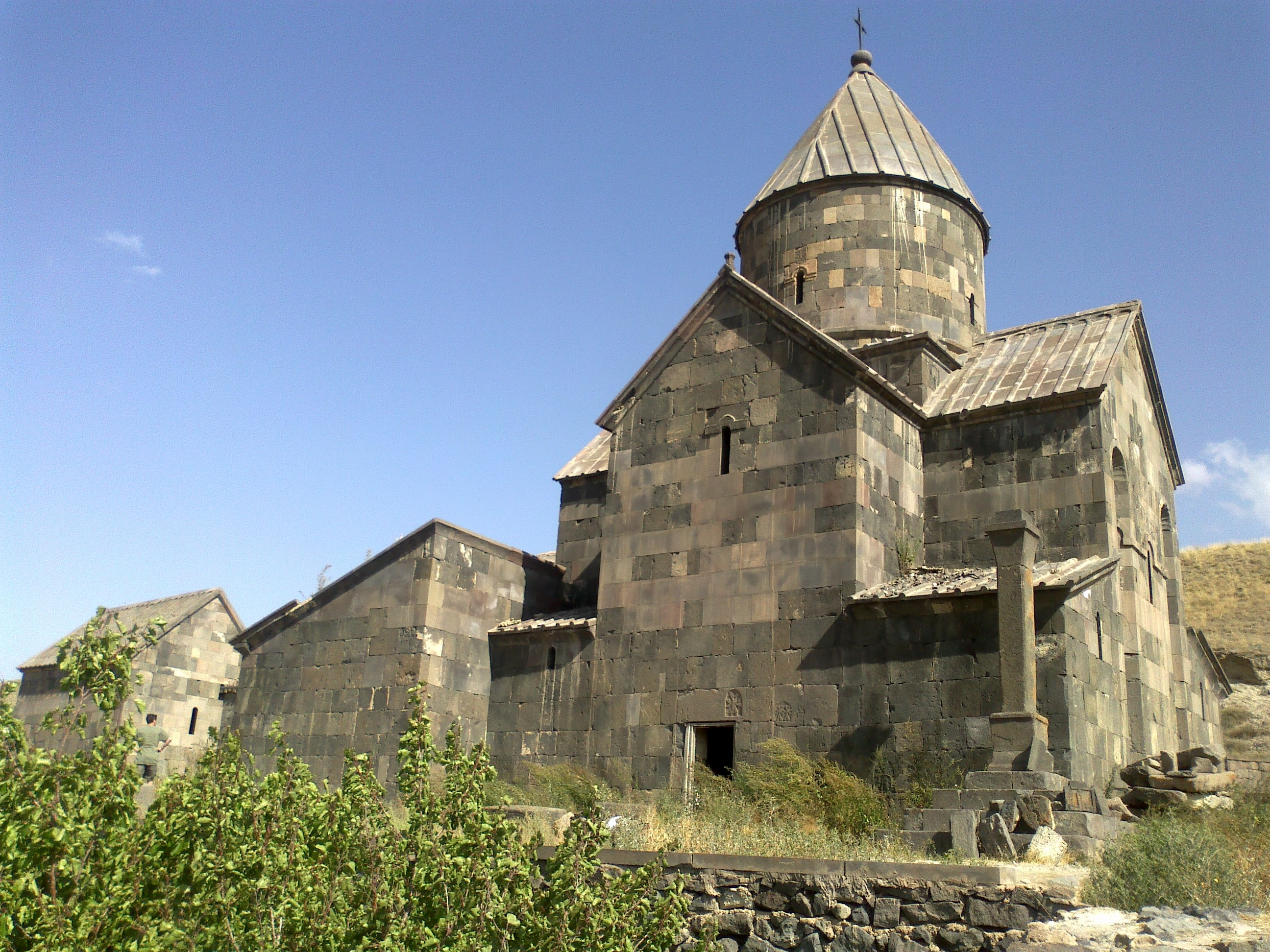
Vorotnavank, 9th–11th centuries

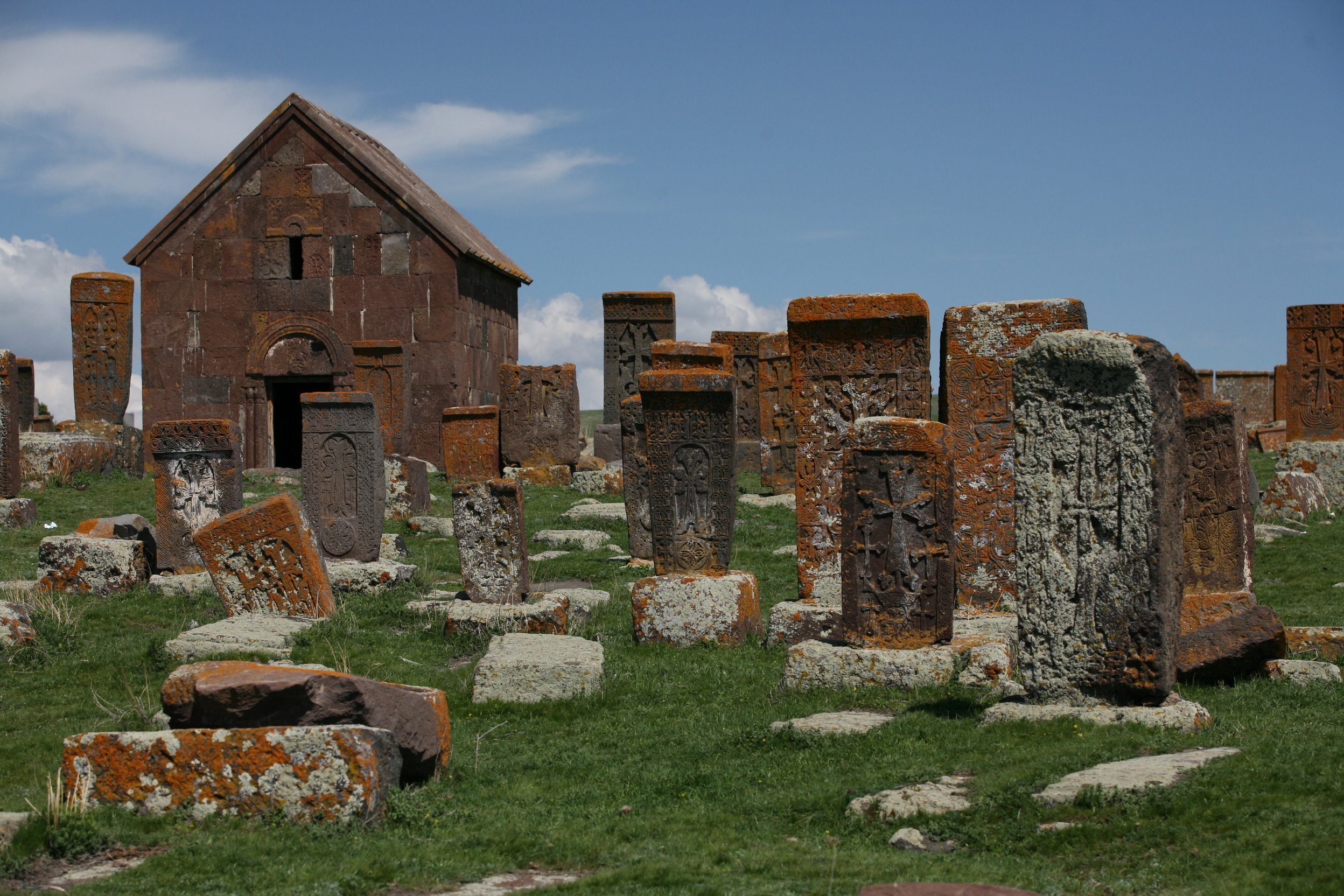
Khachkar from Noratus, 10th–13th centuries

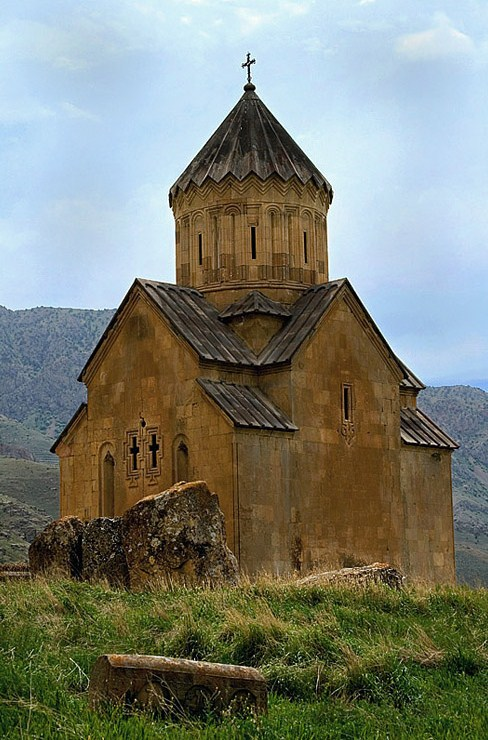
Areni Church, 1321

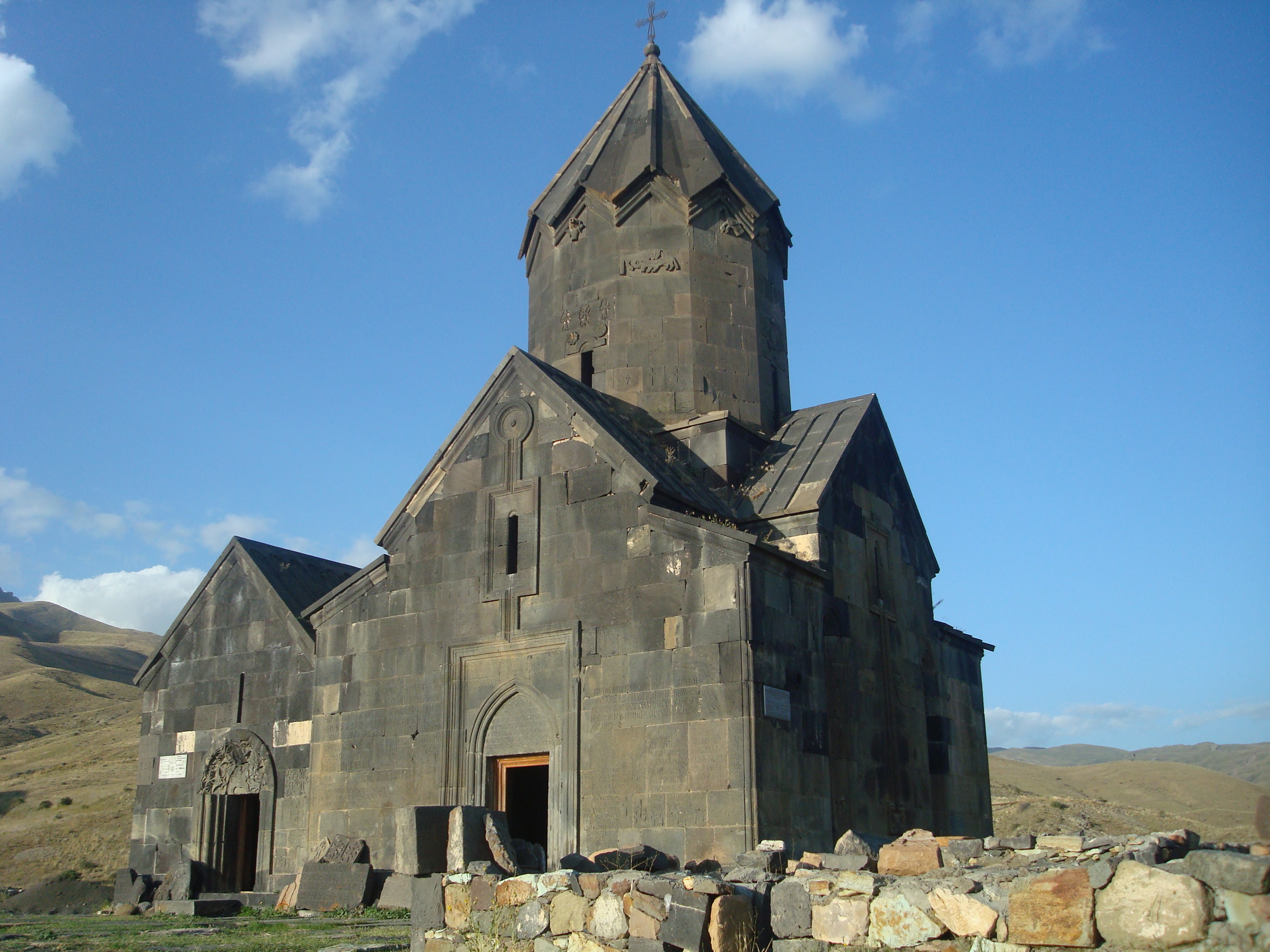
Tanahat Monastery, 1273–1279

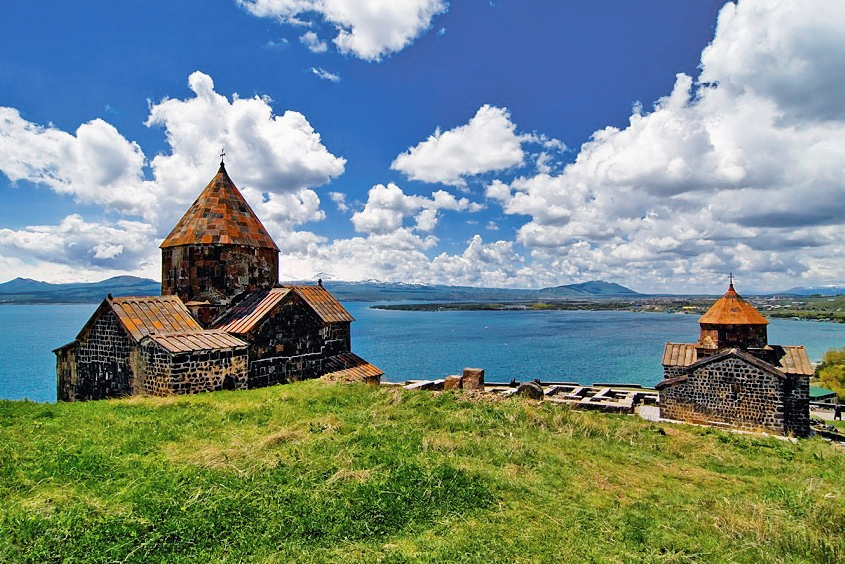
Sevanavank, 874

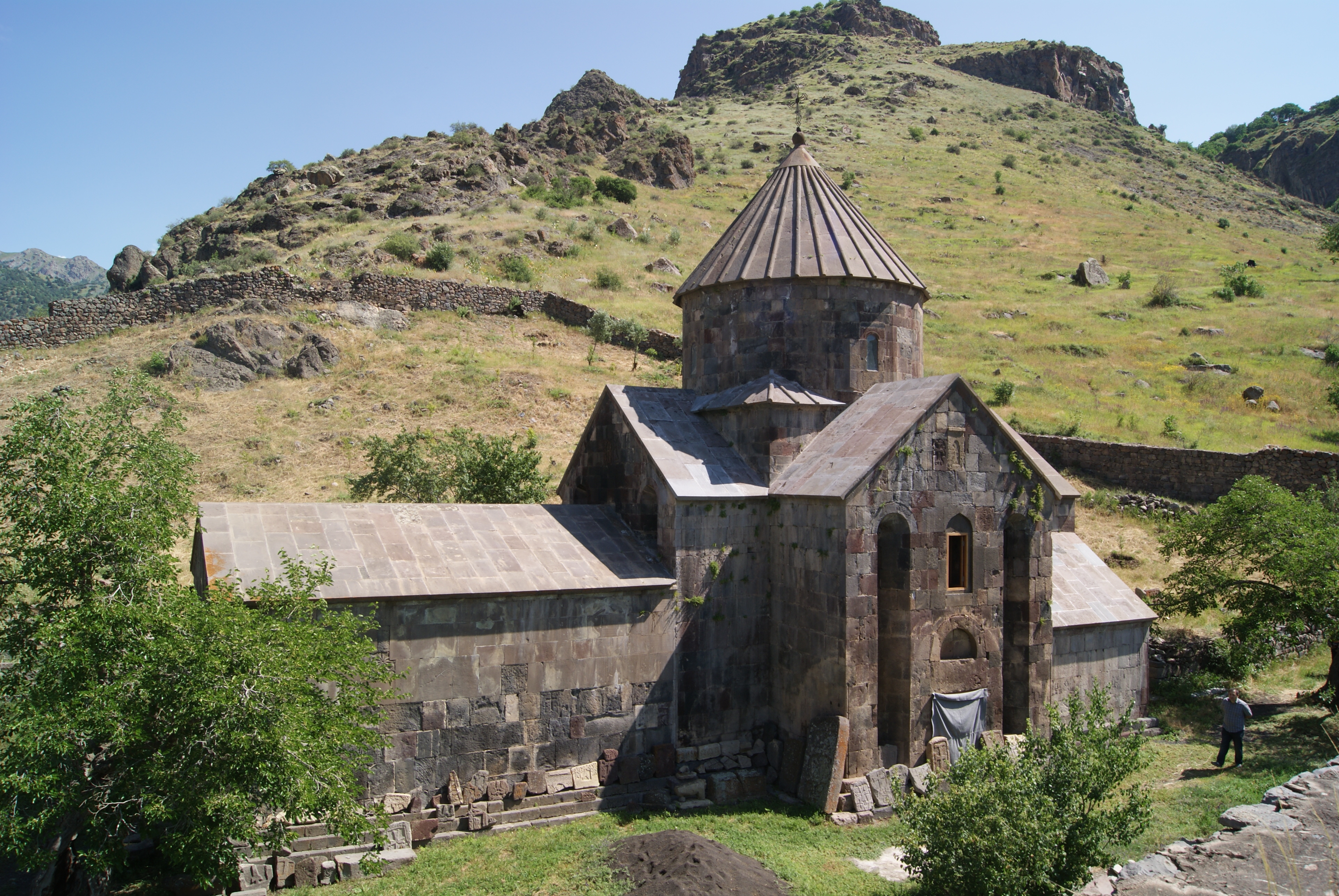
Gndevank, 930

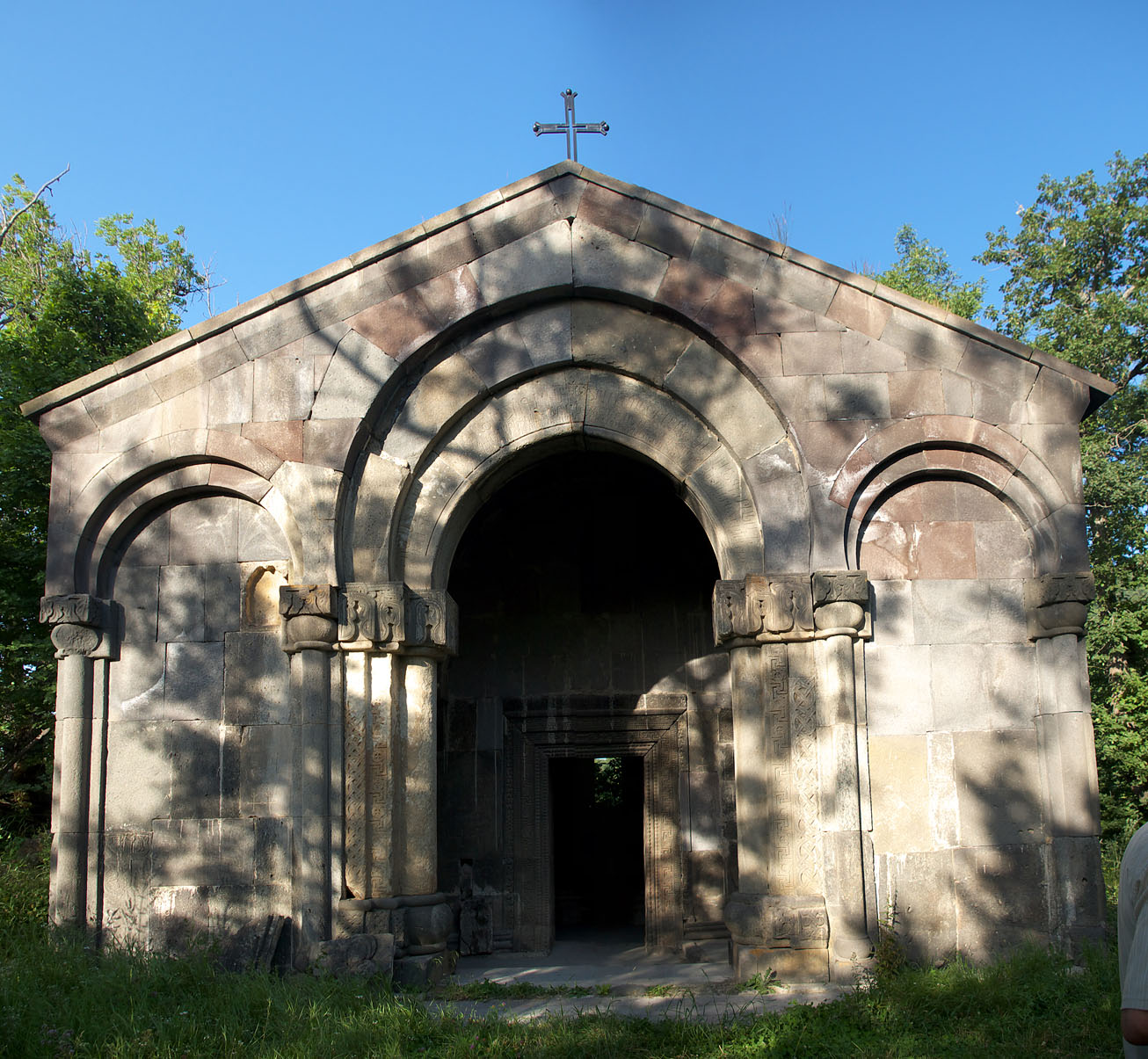
Bgheno-Noravank, 1062

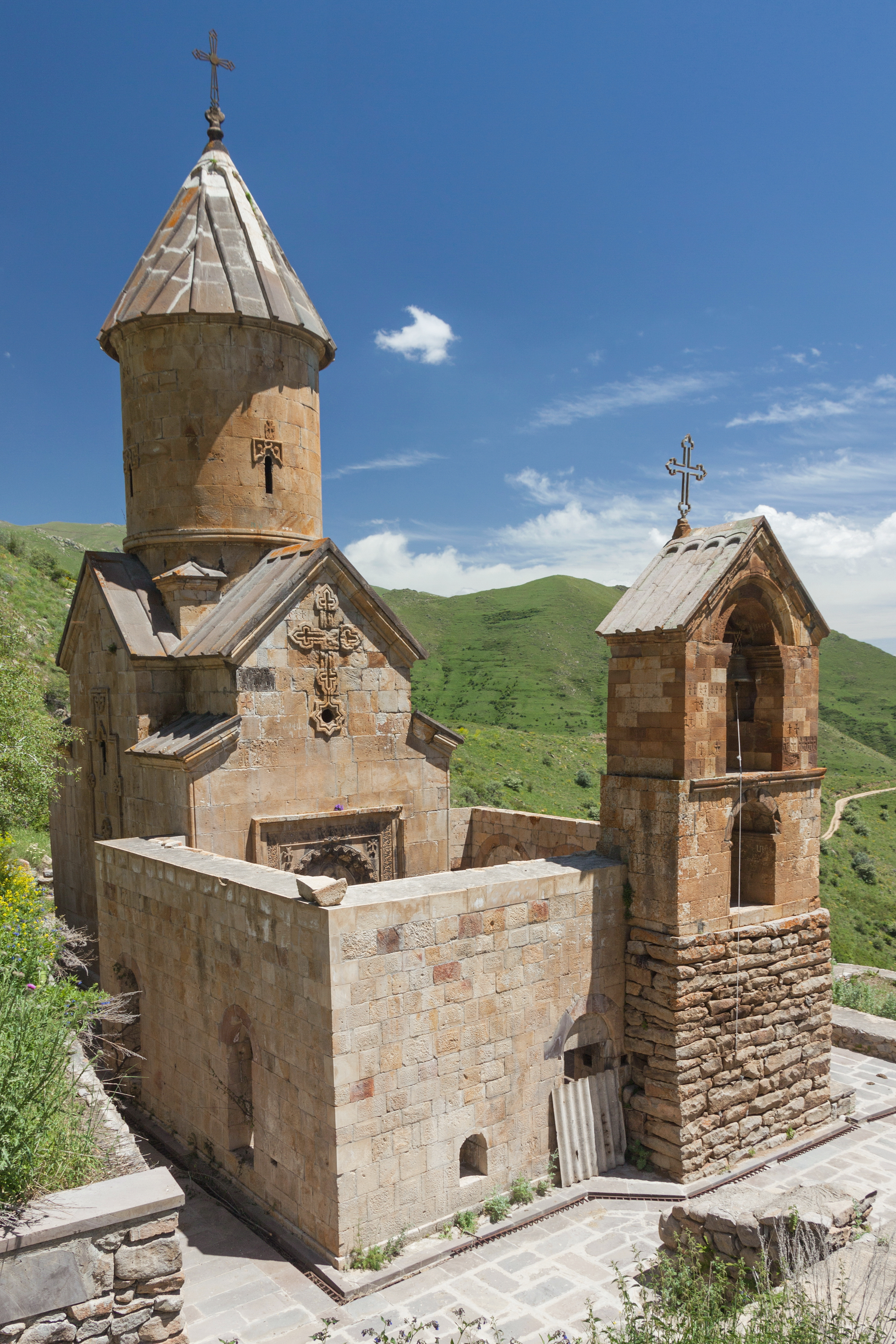
Spitakavor Monastery, 1320–1330

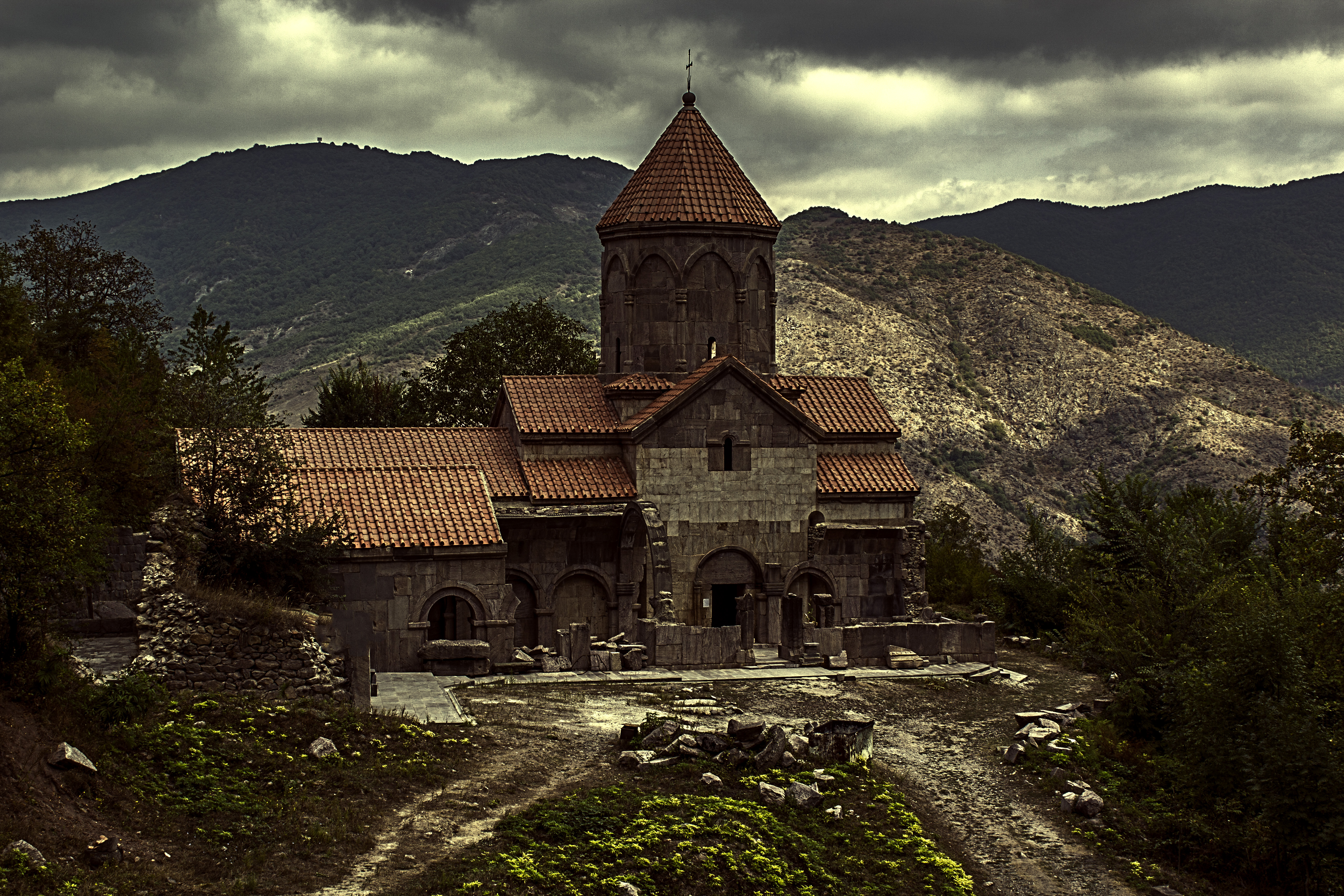
Vahanavank, 10th–11th centuries

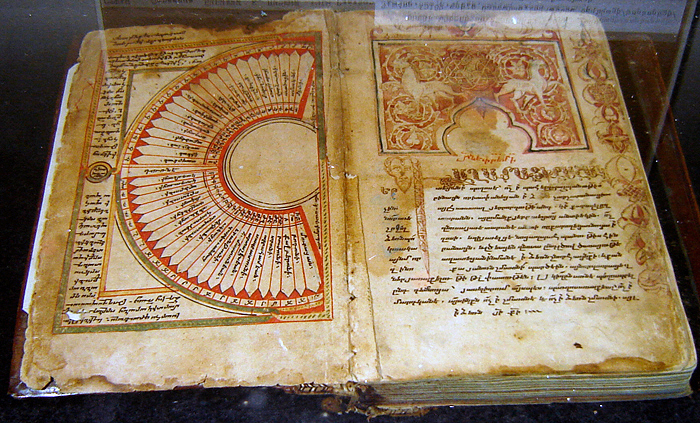
13th-century Armenian manuscript

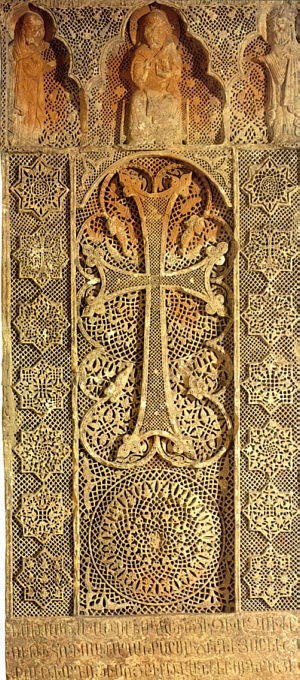
Khachkar of master Momik, 1306

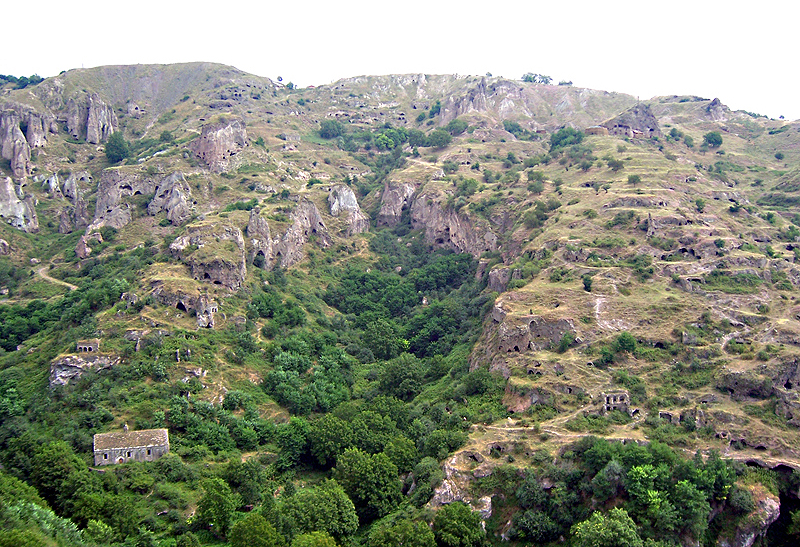
Khndzoresk

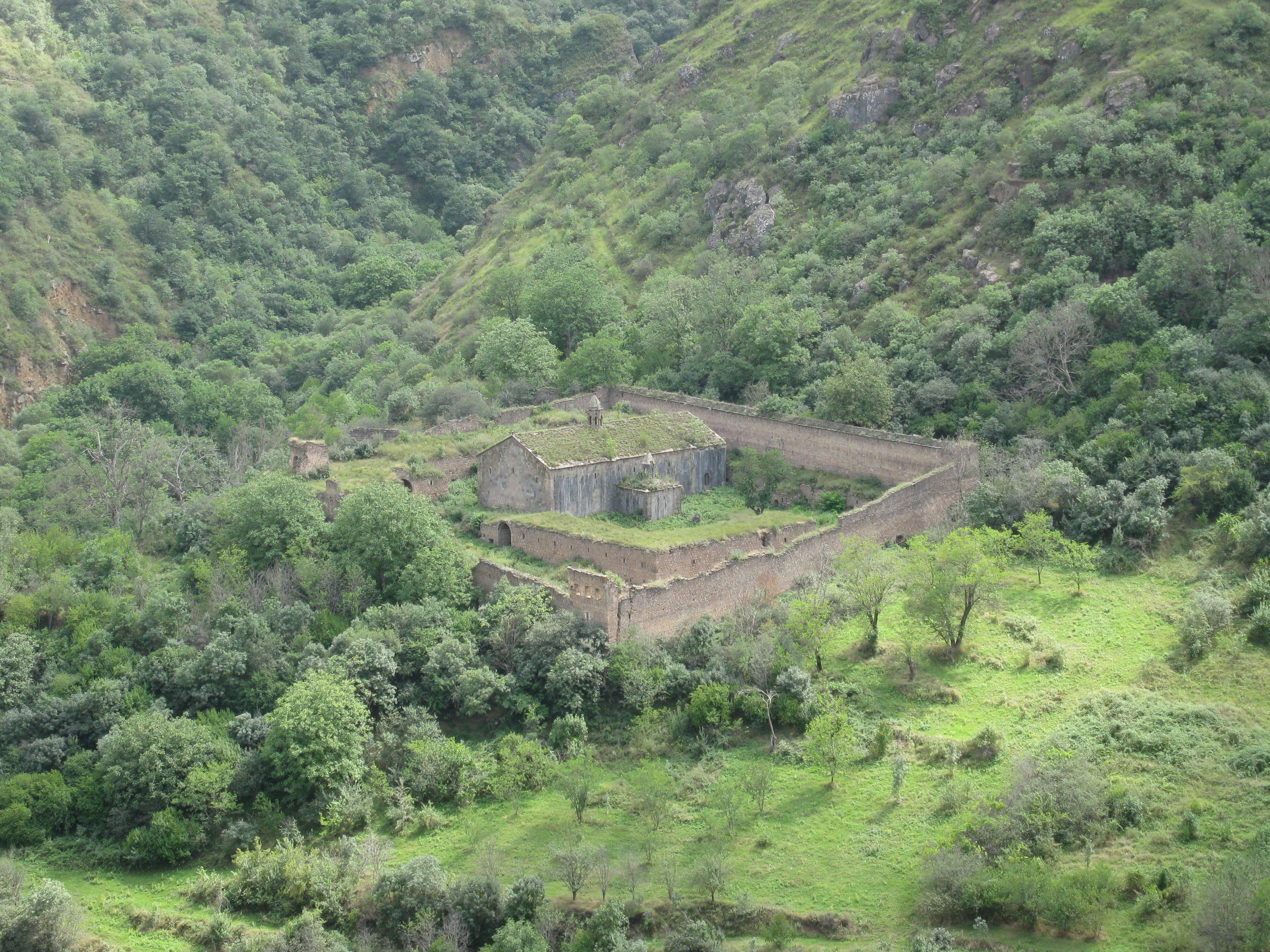
Tatevi Anapat,4-th centuries
