= Avarayr Plain =

Plain in northwestern Iran

Coordinates: 39°20′19.65″N 45°3′25.53″E

The Avarayr Plain (Armenian: Ավարայրի Դաշտ) is the location of the Battle of Avarayr in 451, and is described as being along the banks of the Ṭłmut River (Տղմուտ գետ) (Rūd-e Zangemār, Iran), apparently the Armeno-Persian frontier at that time. At the time, the Avarayr plain was part of the Armenian region of Vaspurakan. The plain is located today in northwestern Iran close to the village of Chors near the border with Nakhchivan.

== See also ==
- Battle of Avarayr
- Vaspurakan
