= Mushkan Niusalavurt =

5th-century Iranian military officer

Map of the Caucasus

Mushkan Niusalavurt was a 5th-century Iranian military officer, who was active during the reign of the Sasanian King of Kings (shahanshah) Yazdegerd II (r. 438–457). When the Christian Armenians rebelled in 450 under the leadership of Vardan Mamikonian, the wuzurg-framadar (minister) Mihr-Narseh appointed Mushkan as the head of Iranian forces. The following year (451), he took part in the Battle of Avarayr, where the insurgents were defeated, and nine of their generals killed, including Vardan. Mushken survived but was heavily wounded.

The contemporary Armenian historians Elishe and Lazar Parpetsi both give differing reports of the aftermath of the battle, albeit with the same outcome. According to Elishe, Mushken was greatly upset at the heavy casualties the Iranians had suffered in the battle, and thus gave the pro-Iranian Armenian prince Vasak Siwni free rein in Armenia. However, this resulted in even more bloodshed and turmoil, which led to the protest of many Armenian notables, and also by Mushkan himself. As a result, Vasak was imprisoned, while Adhur-Hormizd was installed the marzban (margrave) of Armenia. According to Lazar, however, Mushkan was dismissed and sent back to Iran after he reported the Iranian losses to Yazdegerd II, who then appointed Adhur-Hormizd as the marzban of Armenia. Not long after, Vasak was imprisoned due to his deception towards the Armenians which had caused further turmoil.

== Sources ==
- Thomson, Robert W. (1982). History of Vardan and the Armenian War. Cambridge: Harvard University Press. pp. 1–353. ISBN 9780674403352.
