= Hambarakapet =

Hambarakapet (meaning "overseer-of-stores, quartermaster") was a high-ranking Sasanian office which was equivalent to the office of quartermaster.

== Sources ==
- Rapp, Stephen H. (2014). The Sasanian World through Georgian Eyes: Caucasia and the Iranian Commonwealth in Late Antique Georgian Literature. Ashgate Publishing, Ltd. ISBN 978-1472425522.
- Russell, James (1994). "Denšapuh". Encyclopaedia Iranica, Vol. VII, Fasc. 3. p. 292.
