= Battle of Avarayr =

Battle between Christian Armenians and the Sasanian Empire (451 CE)

Coordinates: 39°20′20″N 45°3′26″E

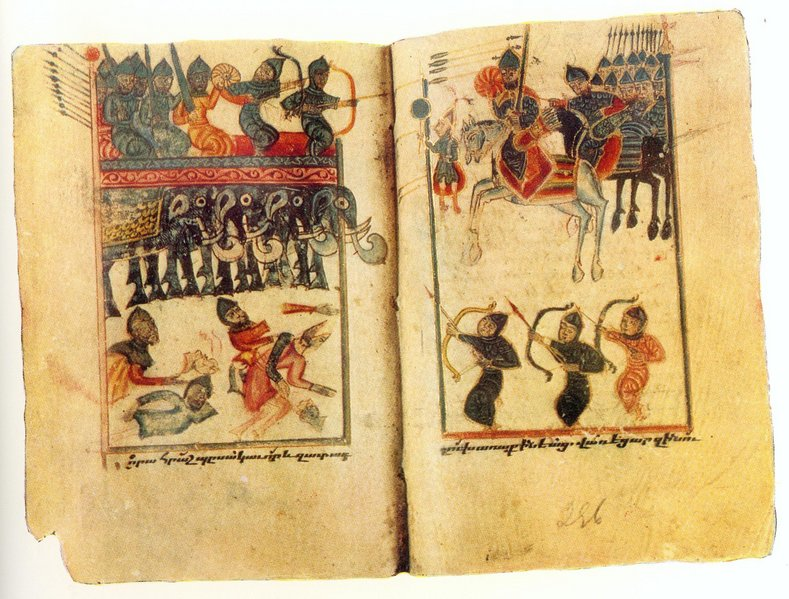
- A 15th-century Armenian miniature depicting the battle
Date	26 May 451
Location	Avarayr Plain, Canton of Artaz, Vaspurakan, Greater Armenia (modern-day Chors, Chaypareh County, West Azerbaijan Province, Iran)
Result	Sasanian victory

Belligerents
Sasanian Empire; Pro-Sasanian Armenians	Christian Armenians

Commanders and leaders
Mushkan Niusalavurt (WIA); Vasak of Syunik (executed)	Vardan Mamikonian †; Ghevond Vanandetsi

Strength
300,000 Sasanians; 60,000 Armenian loyalists Unknown number of elephants	66,000 Armenians (Perhaps exaggerated)

Casualties and losses
Very heavy (3,544 dead)	Very heavy (1,036 dead)

The Battle of Avarayr (Armenian: Ավարայրի ճակատամարտ, romanized: Avarayri chakatamart) was fought on 26 May 451 on the Avarayr Plain in Vaspurakan between a Christian Armenian army under Vardan Mamikonian and Sassanid Persia. It is considered one of the first battles in defense of the Christian faith. Although the Persians were victorious on the battlefield, it was a pyrrhic victory. The Armenians were allowed to continue practising Christianity freely.

The battle is seen as one of the most significant events in Armenian history. The commander of the Armenian forces, Vardan Mamikonian, is considered a national hero and has been canonized by the Armenian Apostolic Church.

== Background ==
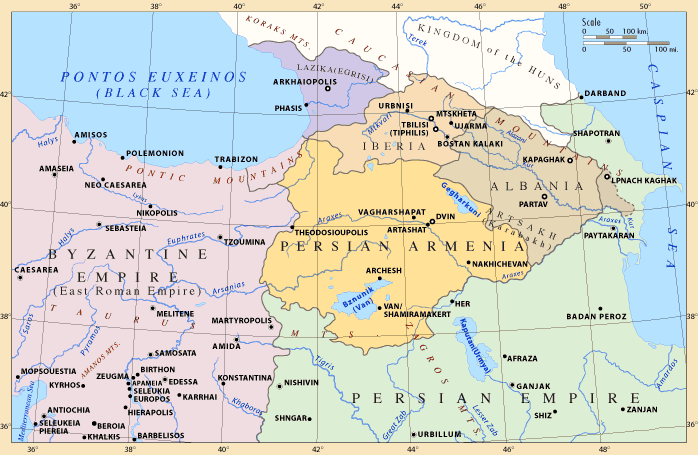
The area of Armenia under Persian rule

The Kingdom of Armenia under the Arsacid dynasty of Armenia was the first nation to officially convert to Christianity, in 301 under Tiridates III. In 428, Armenian nobles petitioned Bahram V to depose Artaxias IV. As a result, the country became a Sassanid dependency with a Sassanid governor. The Armenian nobles initially welcomed Persian rule, provided they were allowed to practise Christianity; but Yazdegerd II, concerned that the Armenian Church was hierarchically dependent on the Latin- and Greek-speaking Christian Church (aligned with Rome and Constantinople rather than the Aramaic-speaking and Persian-backed Church of the East) tried to compel the Armenian Church to abandon Rome and Byzantium in favour of the Church of the East or simply convert to Zoroastrianism. He summoned the leading Armenian nobles to Ctesiphon, and pressured them into cutting their ties with the Orthodox Church as he had intended.

The unsteadiness of the empire was ever-increasing under Yazdegerd II, who had an uneasy relationship with the aristocracy and was facing a great challenge by the Kidarites in the east. Yazdegerd II needed the cooperation of the aristocracy so that he could have an organized government to combat the external and internal issues endangering the empire. His policy of integrating the Christian nobility into the bureaucracy led to a major rebellion in Armenia. The cause of the rebellion was the attempt by his minister Mihr-Narseh to impose the Zurvanite variant of Zoroastrianism in Armenia. His intentions differed from those of Yazdegerd II. As a result, many of the Armenian nobles (but not all) rallied under Vardan Mamikonian, the supreme commander (sparapet) of Armenia. The Armenian rebels tried to appeal to the Romans for help, but to no avail. Meanwhile, another faction of Armenians, led by the marzban (governor) Vasak Siwni allied themselves with the Sasanians.

== Battle ==
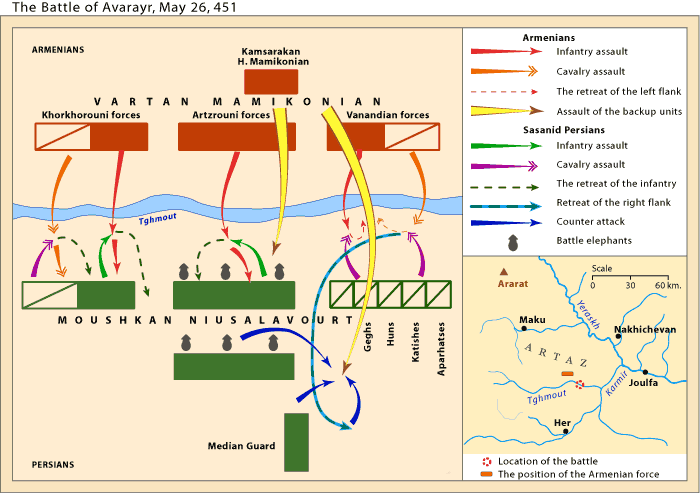
A tactical overview of the battle

The 66,000-strong Armenian army took Holy Communion before the battle. The army was a popular uprising, rather than a professional force, but the Armenian nobility who led it and their respective retinues were accomplished soldiers, many of them veterans of the Sassanid dynasty's wars with Rome and the nomads of Central Asia. The Armenians were allowed to maintain a core of their national army led by a supreme commander (sparapet) who was traditionally of the Mamikonian noble family. The Armenian cavalry was, at the time, practically an elite force greatly appreciated as a tactical ally by both Persia and Byzantium. In this particular case, both officers and men were additionally motivated by a desire to save their religion and their way of life. The Persian army, said to be three times larger, included war elephants and the famous Savārān, or New Immortal, cavalry. Several Armenian noblemen with weaker Christian sympathies, led by Vasak Siuni, went over to the Persians before the battle, and fought on their side; in the battle, Vardan won initial successes, but was eventually slain along with eight of his top officers.

== Outcome ==
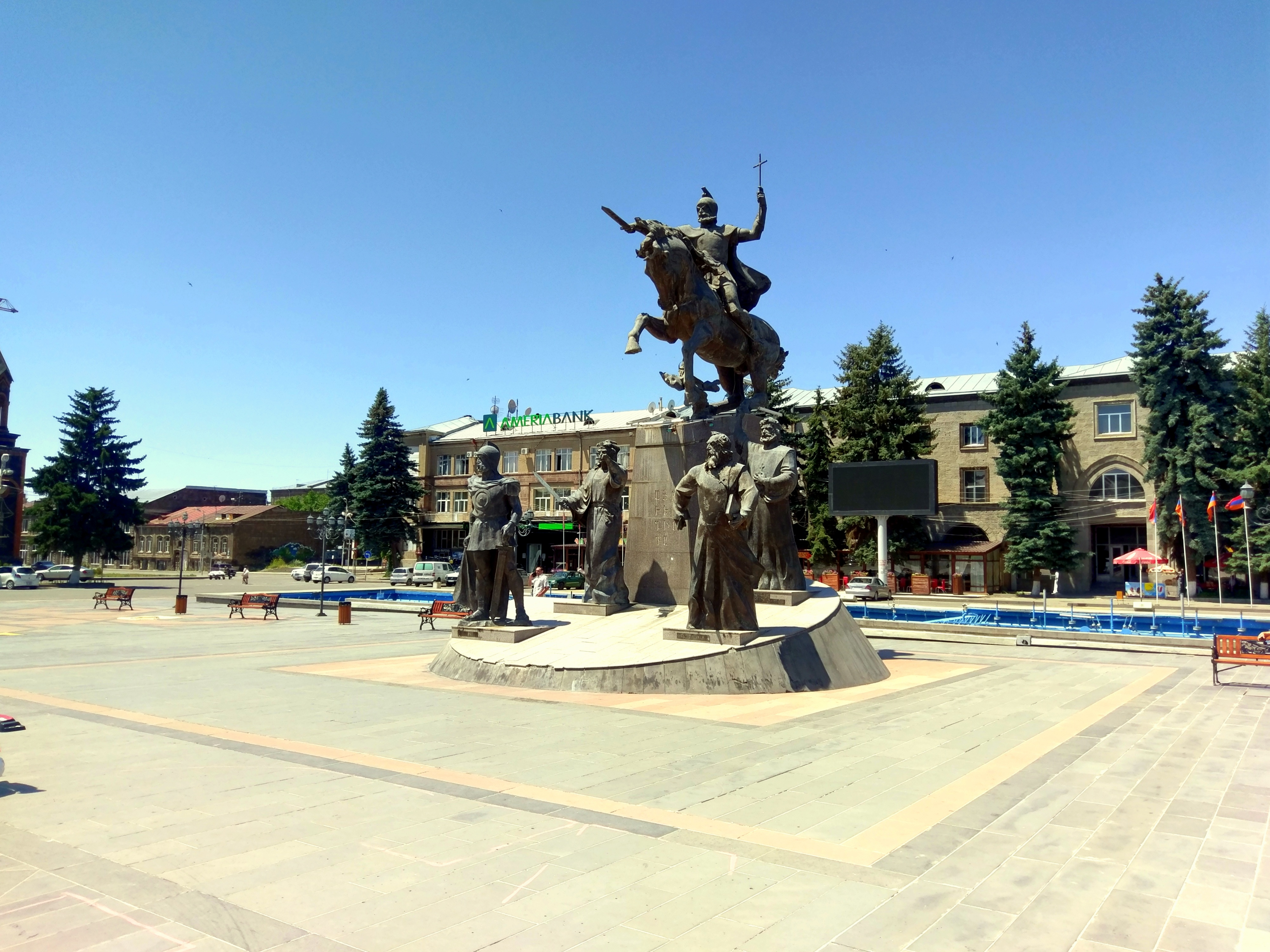
Memorial to the Battle of Avarayr in Gyumri, Armenia

Nine generals, including Vardan Mamikonian, were killed, with a large number of the Armenian nobles and soldiers meeting the same fate. The Sasanians, however, had also suffered heavy losses due to the resolute struggle by the Armenian rebels. Yazdegerd II dismissed Vasak Siwni and allowed religious freedom in Armenia. Although tensions continued until 510 when a kinsman of Vardan Mamikonian, Vard Mamikonian, was appointed marzban by Yazdegerd II's grandson, Kavad I (r. 488–531).

== See also ==
- Sasanian Armenia
- War elephant
- Zoroastrianism in Armenia
