= Vasak Siwni =

- Վասակ Սյունի

Lord of Syunik
- In office 413–452

Marzban of Persian Armenia
- In office 442–452
- Monarch: Yazdegerd II
- Preceded by: Veh Mihr Shapur
- Succeeded by: Adhur Hormizd

Personal details
- Died: 452 Ctesiphon

Vasak Siwni (Armenian: Վասակ Սիւնի; d. 452) was an Armenian prince, who was the lord of the principality of Syunik from 413 to 452, and also served as marzban (margrave) of Sasanian Armenia from 442 to 452. He renounced Christianity and joined the Sasanian forces against the leaders of the Armenian rebellion in 450/1, which culminated in the defeat of the rebel forces at the battle of Avarayr.

The contemporary Armenian historians Elishe and Lazar Parpetsi both give differing reports of the aftermath of the battle, albeit with the same outcome. According to Elishe, the Iranian general Mushkan Niusalavurt was greatly upset at the heavy casualties the Iranians had suffered in the battle, and thus gave Vasak Siwni free rein in Armenia. However, this resulted in even more bloodshed and turmoil, which led to the protest of many Armenian notables, and also by Mushkan himself. As a result, Vasak was imprisoned, while Adhur-Hormizd was installed as the marzban of Armenia. According to Lazar, however, Mushkan was dismissed and sent back to Iran after he reported the Iranian losses to Yazdegerd II, who then appointed Adhur-Hormizd as the marzban of Armenia. Not long after, Vasak was imprisoned due to his deception towards the Armenians which had caused further turmoil.

== Sources ==
- Avdoyan, Levon (2018). "Vasak Siwni". In Nicholson, Oliver (ed.). The Oxford Dictionary of Late Antiquity. Oxford: Oxford University Press. ISBN 978-0-19-866277-8.
- Thomson, Robert W. (1982). History of Vardan and the Armenian War. Cambridge: Harvard University Press. pp. 1–353. ISBN 9780674403352.
