= Varsken =

Mihranid prince

Bidaxsh of Gugark
- Reign: 470–482
- Predecessor: Arshusha II
- Successor: Arshusha III
- Died: 482
- Consort: Shushanik; Unnamed daughter of Peroz I
- Issue: Arshusha III
- Dynasty: Mihranids
- Father: Arshusha II
- Mother: Anushvram Artsruni
- Religion: Christianity (before 470); Zoroastrianism (after 470)

Varsken (Middle Persian: Vazgēn) was an Iranian prince from the Mihranid family of Gugark, who served as the bidaxsh (margrave) of the region from 470 to 482. He was the son and successor of Arshusha II.

Upon the death of his father, Varsken went to the Sasanian capital of Ctesiphon and was received by the shahanshah Peroz I (r. 459–484), converting to the family's former religion, Zoroastrianism. As a reward for his conversion, he was given the viceroyalty of Caucasian Albania and a daughter of Peroz in marriage.

Espousing his pro-Iranian position, Varsken attempted to force his family to convert to Zoroastrianism, including his first wife Shushanik, which eventually resulted in her martyrdom, dying from the violence inflicted by her husband. His policies were unacceptable to the Iberian king Vakhtang I (r. 447/49–502/22), who had him killed and then revolted against Iran in 482. Varsken was succeeded by Arshusha III.

== Biography ==
Map of the Caucasus

Varsken was the son of Arshusha II, who was the bidaxsh (margrave) of Gugark, a historical area in the Caucasus, which had originally been part of the Kingdom of Armenia, but fell under the authority of the Iberian kings after the Sasanians and Romans partitioned Armenia in 387. Not much earlier, the Iberian Kingdom had fallen under the authority of the Sasanians, who under Shapur II (r. 309–379) installed Aspacures II on the Iberian throne in 363.

The family of Varsken—the Mihranids—had under Peroz established themselves as the bidaxshes of Gugark in c. 330, thus supplanting the previous Gusharid bidaxshes. Albeit the family claimed descent from the Persian Sasanian rulers of Iran, they were in reality a branch of the House of Mihran, one of the Seven Great Houses of Iran. Under Peroz the family abandoned its Zoroastrian beliefs in favour of Christianity. The Mihranids of Gugark enjoyed close relations with the Iberian kings (also of Mihranid descent), with whom they intermarried.

Varsken's mother was Anushvram Artsruni, an Armenian noblewomen from the Artsruni family, who was the sister-in-law of the Armenian military leader Hmayeak Mamikonian, himself brother of the Armenian rebel and martyr Vardan Mamikonian. Varsken's father, Arshusha II, was a hostage of the Sasanian court at Ctesiphon, and could not participate in the Christian Armenian rebellion in 451, led by Vardan Mamikonian. After the defeat of the Armenian rebels at Avarayr, Hmayeak Mamikonian was killed at Tao. Hmayeak's sons, Vahan Mamikonian, Vasak, Vard and Artaxias, were then taken hostage and sent to Ctesiphon, where they met Arshusha II. Arshusha was later able to buy his freedom back. He then freed the sons of Hmayeak, and took them back to Armenia with their mother. Later, Arshusha organized the wedding of his son Varsken with Shushanik, daughter of Vardan Mamikonian.

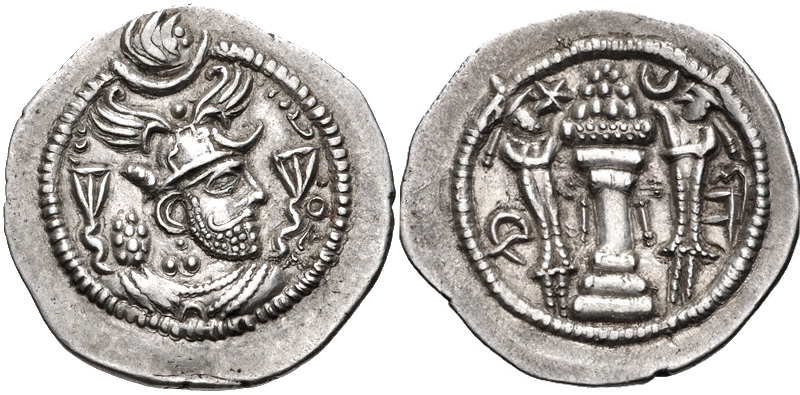
Coin of Peroz I (r. 459–484)

Upon the death of his Arshusha, Varsken went to Ctesiphon and was received by the Sasanian shahanshah Peroz I (r. 459–484), converting to the family's former religion, Zoroastrianism. He also shifted his allegiance from the Christian Iberian monarchy to the Sasanian Empire. As a reward for his conversion, he was given the viceroyalty of Caucasian Albania and a daughter of Peroz in marriage.

The basilica of Bolnisi Sioni in Iberia is a testimony of the growing Sasanian influence there. It was constructed in 478/479 in the southern part of the country, which had fallen under the control of the Mihranids. The iconography of the basilica showed Iranian characteristics, while its inscription, written in Old Georgian, mentions the shahanshah Peroz I. Under Varsken and his predecessors, the city of Tsurtavi was transformed into one of the seats of the bidaxshate. The reports of the contemporary Iberian historian Iakob Tsurtaveli indicates that Varsken was a sovereign in his own right, and acknowledged the suzerainty of the shahanshah only as a counterbalance to the Iberian kings.

Espousing his pro-Iranian position, Varsken attempted to force his family to convert to Zoroastrianism, including Shushanik, which eventually resulted in her martyrdom, dying from the violence inflicted by her husband. His Zoroastrianizing efforts were seemingly only limited to that of his family. There are no reports of attempts to convert his Christian subjects, and the main source for Shushanik's life—the Martyrdom of the Holy Queen Shushanik—does not consider the martyrdom of his wife as part of a systematic Christian persecution. His policies were unacceptable to the Iberian king Vakhtang I (r. 447/49–502/22), who had him killed and then revolted against Iran in 482. Varsken was succeeded by Arshusha III.

== Genealogy ==
Ancestors of Varsken

8. Arshusha I
4. Bakur II
2. Arshusha II
1. Varsken
12. Vache II Artsruni
6. Vasak I Artsruni
3. Anushvram Artsruni

== Sources ==
- Bonner, Michael (2020). The Last Empire of Iran. New York: Gorgias Press. pp. 1–406. ISBN 978-1463206161.
- Bosworth, C. Edmund (1986). "ARRĀN". In Yarshater, Ehsan (ed.). Encyclopædia Iranica. Vol. II/5: Armenia and Iran IV–Art in Iran I. London and New York: Routledge & Kegan Paul. pp. 520–522. ISBN 978-0-71009-105-5.
- Chaumont, M. L. (1985). "Albania". In Yarshater, Ehsan (ed.). Encyclopædia Iranica. Vol. I/8: Alafrank–Alp Arslan. London and New York: Routledge & Kegan Paul. pp. 806–810. ISBN 978-0-71009-097-3.
- Daryaee, Touraj (2009). "Šāpur II". In Yarshater, Ehsan (ed.). Encyclopædia Iranica (Online ed.). Encyclopædia Iranica Foundation.
- Dédéyan, Gérard (2007). History of the Armenian people. Tolosa: Privat. ISBN 978-2-7089-6874-5.
- (in French) Histoire de l'Arménie: des origines à 1071, Paris, 1947.
- Grousset, René (1947). Histoire de l'Arménie des origines à 1071. Paris.
- Kia, Mehrdad (2016). The Persian Empire: A Historical Encyclopedia [2 volumes]: A Historical Encyclopedia. ABC-CLIO. ISBN 978-1610693912.
- Rapp, Stephen H. (2014). The Sasanian World through Georgian Eyes: Caucasia and the Iranian Commonwealth in Late Antique Georgian Literature. Farnham: Ashgate Publishing. ISBN 978-1-4724-2552-2.
- Suny, Ronald Grigor (1994). The Making of the Georgian Nation. Indiana University Press. pp. 1–418. ISBN 978-0253209153.
- Toumanoff, Cyril (1961). "Introduction to Christian Caucasian History: II: States and Dynasties of the Formative Period". Traditio. 17. Cambridge University Press: 1–106. doi:10.1017/S0362152900008473. JSTOR 27830424. S2CID 151524770. (registration required)
- Toumanoff, Cyril (1963). Studies in Christian Caucasian history. Georgetown University Press. pp. 1–599.
- Toumanoff, Cyril (1969). "Chronology of the early kings of Iberia". Traditio. 25. Cambridge University Press: 1–33. doi:10.1017/S0362152900010898. JSTOR 27830864. S2CID 151472930. (registration required)
- (in French) Toumanoff, Cyril (1990). Les dynasties de la Caucasie Chrétienne: de l'Antiquité jusqu'au XIXe siècle : tables généalogiques et chronologiques. Princeton University Press. ISBN 978-1400832866.

Preceded by Arshusha II	Bidaxsh of Gugark; 470–482	Succeeded by Arshusha III
