= Iakob Tsurtaveli =

5th-century Georgian religious writer and priest

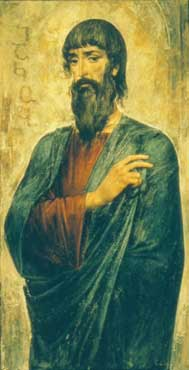
Jacob of Tsurtavi

Jacob of Tsurtavi (Georgian: იაკობ ცურტაველი, romanized: iak'ob tsurt'aveli) also known as Jacob the Priest (იაკობ ხუცესი, Iakob Khutsesi) was the 5th-century Georgian religious writer and priest from Tsurtavi, then the major town of Gogarene and the Lower Iberia.

A personal priest of Saint Shushanik and an eyewitness of her martyrdom at the hand of her spouse, bidaxsh Varsken, Jacob compiled her life in his hagiographic novel the Martyrdom of the Holy Queen Shushanik, the oldest surviving work of the Georgian literature written between 476 and 483. Except for scarce information obtained from his work, nothing more is known about Jacob's life.

== See also ==
- List of Georgian writers
