= Mihranids of Gugark =

Iranian princely dynasty (c. 330 - 8th century CE)

- 330–8th-century
- Government: Monarchy
- Bidaxsh
  - 330–361?: Peroz (first)
  - mid 8th-century: Arshusha VI (last mentioned)
- Historical era: Middle Ages
  - Established: 330
  - Disestablished: 8th-century
Preceded by	Succeeded by
Gusharids	Bagratuni dynasty

The Mihranids of Gugark were an Iranian princely dynasty, which ruled the Armeno-Iberian frontier region of Gugark from c. 330 to the 8th century. They held the title of bidaxsh ("margrave").

== History ==
Albeit the family claimed descent from the Persian Sasanian rulers of Iran, they were in reality a branch of the House of Mihran, one of the Seven Great Houses of Iran. Its first bidaxsh was Peroz, who dislodged the Gusharid bidaxshes of Gugark, thus initiating Mihranid rule there. During this period, the Mihranids enjoyed warm relations with the newly established Chosroid dynasty of Iberia, also a branch of the Mihranids. Peroz was the son-in-law of Mirian III, the first Christian king of Iberia. Although Peroz refused to convert to Christianity, he still remained loyal to the Iberian king. He and his followers finally converted during the rule of the Mirian III's son and successor Aspacures III (r. 363?–380).

Gugark was normally subject to the Kingdom of Armenia, but fell under the authority of Iberia after the Sasanians and Romans partitioned Armenia in 387. Not much earlier, the Iberian Kingdom had fallen under the authority of the Sasanians after an invasion by the King of Kings (shahanshah) Shapur II (r. 309–379). Varsken travelled to the Iranian court in 470, where he converted to Zoroastrianism and shifted his allegiance from the Iberian monarchy to the Sasanian Empire. As a reward for his conversion, he was given the viceroyalty of Caucasian Albania and a daughter of Peroz in marriage. Espousing his pro-Iranian position, he attempted to force his family to convert to Zoroastrianism, including his first wife Shushanik (a daughter of Vardan), which eventually resulted in her martyrdom. His policies were unacceptable to the Iberian king Vakhtang I (r. 447/49–502/22), who had him killed and then revolted against Iran in 482. The bidaxsh Vahram-Arshusha V sided with the Sasanians during the Byzantine–Sasanian War of 602–628, and was captured at the Battle of Nineveh on 12 December 627.

In the 8th century, the lands and titles of the Mihranids was acquired by the Armenian Bagratuni princes, thus marking the end of the Mihranids of Gugark.

== List of bidaxshes ==
Based on available sources, the modern historian Cyril Toumanoff has deduced a list of the ruling Mihranid bidaxshes of Gugark, albeit it remains incomplete.

Name	Reign
Peroz	330–361?
Bakur I	after 394–430
Arshusha I	after 430–?
Bakur II	mid 5th-century
Arshusha II	?–470
Varsken	470–482
Arshusha III	482–after 540/1
Arshusha IV	ca. first decade of the 7th-century
Vahram-Arshusha V	late 620s
Arshusha VI	mid 8th-century

== Sources ==
- Bonner, Michael (2020). The Last Empire of Iran. New York: Gorgias Press. pp. 1–406. ISBN 978-1463206161.
- Daryaee, Touraj (2009). "Šāpur II". Encyclopaedia Iranica.
- Dédéyan, Gérard (2007). History of the Armenian people. Tolosa: Privat. ISBN 978-2-7089-6874-5.
- Kia, Mehrdad (2016). The Persian Empire: A Historical Encyclopedia [2 volumes]: A Historical Encyclopedia. ABC-CLIO. ISBN 978-1610693912.
- Rapp, Stephen H. (2014). The Sasanian World through Georgian Eyes: Caucasia and the Iranian Commonwealth in Late Antique Georgian Literature. Ashgate Publishing, Ltd. ISBN 978-1472425522.
- Suny, Ronald Grigor (1994). The Making of the Georgian Nation. Indiana University Press. pp. 1–418. ISBN 9780253209153.
- Toumanoff, Cyril (1961). "Introduction to Christian Caucasian History: II: States and Dynasties of the Formative Period". Traditio. 17. Cambridge University Press: 1–106. doi:10.1017/S0362152900008473. JSTOR 27830424. S2CID 151524770. (registration required)
- Toumanoff, Cyril (1963). Studies in Christian Caucasian history. Georgetown University Press.
- Toumanoff, Cyril (1969). "Chronology of the early kings of Iberia". Traditio. 25. Cambridge University Press: 1–33. doi:10.1017/S0362152900010898. JSTOR 27830864. S2CID 151472930. (registration required)
