= Mravaltavi =

Parkhali Mravaltavi

Mravaltavi (Georgian: მრავალთავი, literally "many-headed" or "polycephalon") is an ancient Georgian liturgical miscellany, comprising homilies, sermons, and hagiographical material. It compiles various readings designated for the feasts of the Lord and other major holy days throughout the moveable calendar feasts of the liturgical year.

== Origin of the name ==
The term Mravaltavi is first historically attested in the Sinai Mravaltavi (dated to 864 AD). The title was coined by analogy with the Georgian term Otkhtavi (ოთხთავი, literally "four-headed"), which refers to the Four Gospels. Literally translating to "multi-headed" or "polycephalon", this linguistic framework is highly characteristic of Old Georgian. It mirrors other descriptive words of the era, such as mraval-tuali ("multi-eyed," matching the Greek polyommatos to describe cherubim) and ekus-ekus-prte- ("six-winged each," matching the Greek hexapteryx for seraphim). While the literal components match the Greek polykephalon ("multi-headed"), medieval records, such as the bilingual 10th-century Typicon of the Petritson Monastery, demonstrate that the Greeks did not use "polykephalon" for books. Instead, the direct Greek textual equivalent to a mravaltavi is the eklogadion (ἐκλογάδιον) or eklogarion. Meaning a "collective volume" or "florilegium," it refers to a book of compiled or extracted (gamoḳrebuli) liturgical pericopes and homilies curated for the church calendar year.

== Composition ==
The Greek prototype for the Mravaltavi is the Panegyrikon, a homeliary that almost exclusively contains homilies dedicated to Jesus Christ and the Virgin Mary. Over time, the Georgian Mravaltavi expanded beyond its Greek models, incorporating richer hagiographical materials and local martyrologies.

== List of named or notable Mravaltavi manuscripts ==
Several major manuscripts of the Mravaltavi have survived to the present day.

=== Script Legend ===
- A indicates Majuscule Asomtavruli script.
- N indicates Minuscule Nuskhuri script.
- X Khanmeti
- S Sannarevi
- P^{U} indicates manuscript is a palimpsest and script is the text under the later script.
- P^{O} indicates manuscript is a palimpsest and script is the text over the prior script.

Date	Script	Common name	Pages	Institution and Shelf mark	City, State	Country
ca. 7th c. CE	A, P^{U}	Mravaltavi (X)	fols 19–22, 25, 28–29	Saint Catherine's Monastery, Sin. georg. NF 90	Sinai	Egypt
ca. 9th-10th c. CE	A, P^{U}	Mravaltavi	fols 1–2, 7–8, 11–14	Saint Catherine's Monastery, Sin. georg. NF 90	Sinai	Egypt
670–820	A, P^{U}	Mravaltavi (X/S)		Georgian National Center of Manuscripts S-3902	Tbilisi	Georgia
ca. 9th-10th cc. CE	A, P^{U}		7	Iviron Monastery, Ivir. georg. 47	Mount Athos	Greece
ca. 9th-10th cc. CE	A, P^{U}		5	Saint Catherine's Monastery, Sin. georg. 10	Sinai	Egypt
ca. 9th-10th cc. CE	A, P^{U}		1	Bibliothèque nationale de France, géorg. 5	Paris	France
864	A, N	Sinai Mravaltavi	354	Saint Catherine's Monastery	Sinai	Egypt
10th-11th c. CE	A, N	Parkhali Mravaltavi	658	Georgian National Center of Manuscripts, A-95	Tbilisi	Georgia
ca. 960-970 CE		Athos Mravaltavi	298+2	Iviron Monastery, Ivir. georg. 11	Mount Athos	Greece
ca. 9th c. CE	A	The Udabno Mravaltavi	178	Georgian National Center of Manuscripts, A-1109	Tbilisi	Georgia
