= Martyrdom of the Holy Queen Shushanik =

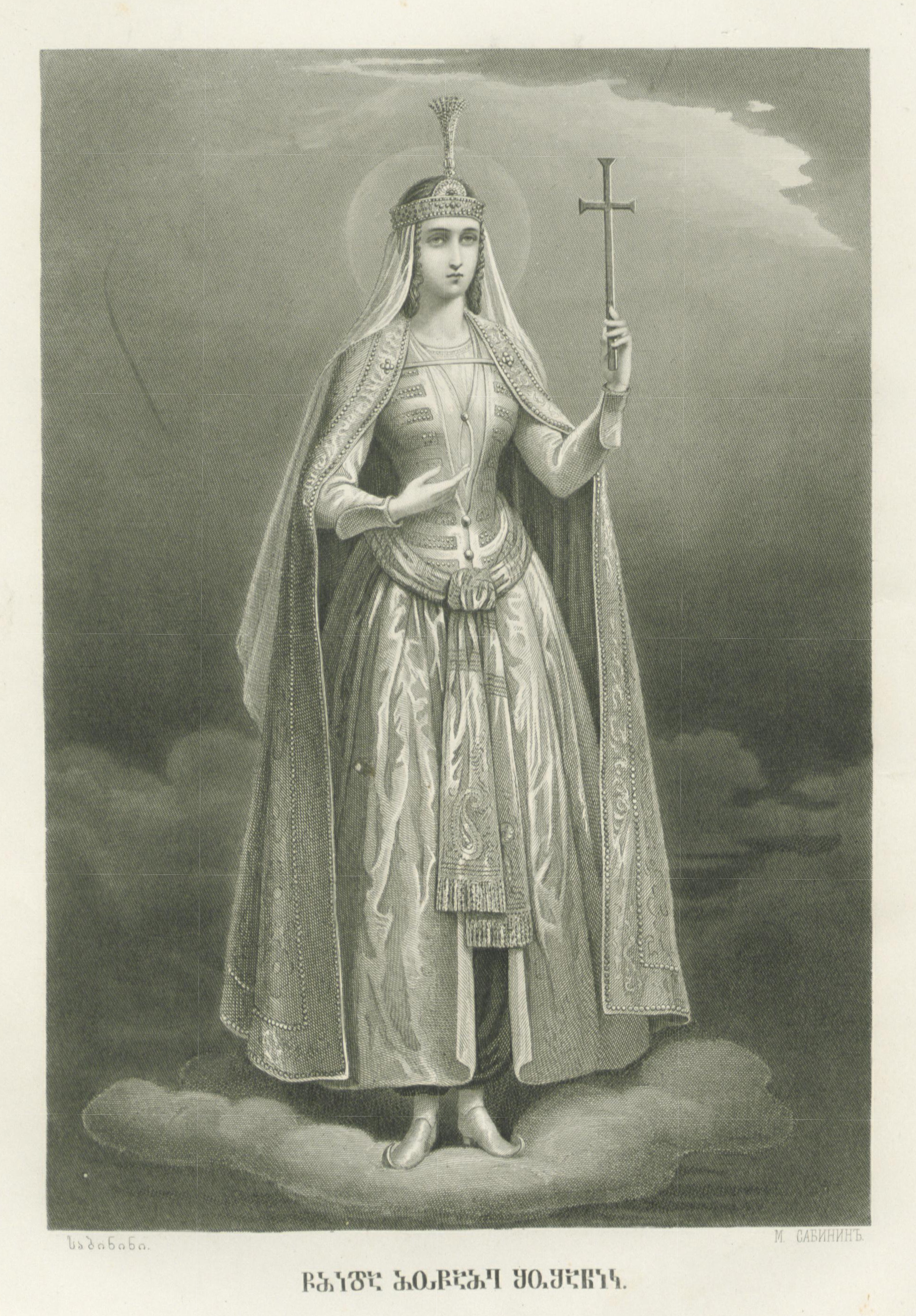
St. Shushanik (5th century), Saint Shushanik Mamikonian

The Martyrdom of the Holy Queen Shushanik (also translated as The Passion of Saint Shushanik; Georgian: წამებაჲ წმიდისა შუშანიკისი დედოფლისაჲ, romanized: ts'amebay ts'midisa shushanik'isi dedoplisay) is the earliest surviving piece of the original Georgian literature.

The author of the text is Iakob Tsurtaveli, a contemporary and participant in the events described in this hagiographic novel.

The text describes the martyrdom of Saint Shushanik, the princess-consort of the ruler of Gogarene, bidaxshe (high prince) Varsken, who had renounced Christianity and embraced Zoroastrianism. Shushanik, whose father was Vardan Mamikonyan, the sparapet (military leader) of the Christians in Armenia, refused to follow him, and died as a martyr after years of imprisonment and torture.

The first printed version was published in 1882. It has been translated into Russian, French, English, German, Spanish, Hungarian and Icelandic. In 1979, UNESCO marked the 1,500th anniversary of the Martyrdom of the Holy Queen Shushanik.

== Manuscripts ==
Purported to have been written between 476 and 483, the text of the Martyrdom has been preserved in eleven surviving manuscripts. The earliest among surviving manuscripts comprising the martyrdom is Parkhali Mravaltavi, presumably datable to the 10th century codex copied at Parkhali Monastery. This codex contains only the first 12 chapters of this text. The 16th quire of the codex, consisting of 8 folios, was lost at an unknown date, resulting in the complete absence of the final third of the narrative.

== Text Editions ==
The textual tradition of The Martyrdom of Saint Shushanik spans multiple recensions across Georgian streams, which have been published since the late 19th century.

=== Georgian Recensions ===
- First Edition (1882): The long Georgian text was first published by Mikhail Sabinin.
- Critical Editions
  1. In 1917, Sargis Gorgadze published a critical edition based on four manuscripts.
  2. Ilia Abuladze issued a highly influential critical edition in 1938 compiled from eight manuscripts (reprinted in 1978). Abuladze followed this in 1963 with a definitive edition integrating all eleven known manuscripts.
  3. A landmark scholarly edition was published in 2025 (Iakob Khutsesi, 2025), featuring an updated critical text, specialized vocabulary, indices, critical commentary, and high-resolution facsimiles of the primary manuscripts.
- The Short (Mount Athos) Version: The short Georgian recension was first edited by Aleksandre Khakhanashvili in 1910, based on the 10th-century manuscript Ivir. georg. 57 preserved at Mount Athos. Because Khakhanashvili’s volume contained numerous transcription errors, Ilia Abuladze republished the text in 1938 using direct photographic reproductions of the Athos codex.
- Synaxarion Traditions: The concise liturgical version from the Georgian Synaxarion was initially published by Abuladze in 1938 based on a single manuscript witness. This was later expanded and republished using two manuscripts by Nestan Janashia in 1980. Additionally, Abuladze’s 1938 volume preserved related textual variants, including an excerpt from The Conversion of Kartli (specifically the narrative of the Cross of Saint Nino) that recounts Shushanik's martyrdom.

== Sources ==
- Bart D Ehrman, Andrew Jacobs, editors, Christianity in Late Antiquity, 300-450 C.E: A Reader, Oxford University Press US, ISBN 0-19-515461-4 pages 499-504
- Donald Rayfield, The Literature of Georgia: A History, Routledge (UK) ISBN 0-7007-1163-5 page 42
