= Arshusha II =

Arshusha II was the Mihranid bidaxsh (margrave) of Gugark in the mid 5th-century. He died in 470 and was succeeded by his son Varsken.

== Sources ==
- Rapp, Stephen H. (2014). The Sasanian World through Georgian Eyes: Caucasia and the Iranian Commonwealth in Late Antique Georgian Literature. Farnham: Ashgate Publishing. ISBN 978-1-4724-2552-2.
- Toumanoff, Cyril (1963). Studies in Christian Caucasian history. Georgetown University Press.
