= Manesus =

Manesus (also spelled Manesos; fl. first half of the 2nd century AD) was a Parthian prince, who served as military governor and official (strategos and bidaxsh) of Parthian-ruled Mesopotamia and Parapotamia, in addition to being the ruler of the Arabs (arabarch) who lived in those areas. He was also collector of customs (παρ[αλή](πτου); perhaps a derivation of Iranian păhrbed). He held these posts during the reign of King Vologases III (r. 110–147).

Manesus was the son of the Parthian King Phraates and was active in the aftermath of Trajan's Parthian campaign. He is attested in a Greek parchment from Dura-Europos (in modern-day Syria), dated to 120/1 AD (Μανήσου τοῦ Φραάτου τῶν Βατησα καὶ τ[ῶν] / [ἐλεύθε]ρων παρ[αλή](πτου) καὶ στρατηγοῦ Μεσοποταμίας καὶ Παραποταμίας καὶ ἀραβάρχου).
