= King Shapur =

King Shapur may refer to:

- Shapur I - second king of the Sasanian Empire, ruling from 240 to 270
- Shapur II - tenth king of the Sasanian Empire, ruling from 309 to 379
- Shapur III - twelfth king of the Sasanian Empire, ruling from 383 to 388
