= Parkhali Mravaltavi =

Manuscript

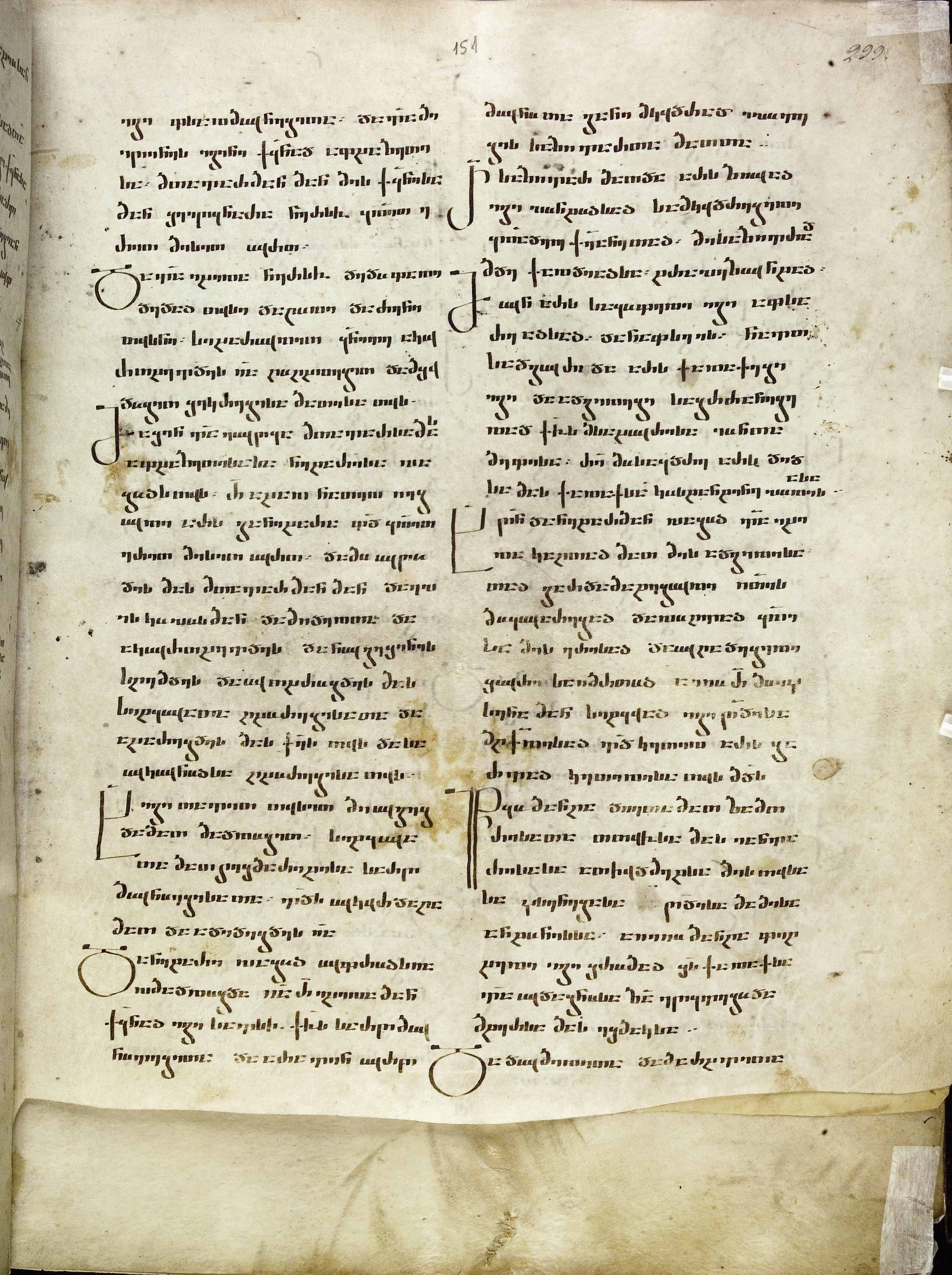
Parkhali Mravaltavi, A-95, fol. 299r. The folio containing the text of the Martyrdom of Abo of Tbilisi

The Parkhali Mravaltavi (Georgian: პარხლის მრავალთავი) is a medieval Georgian multiple-text manuscript of Mravaltavi genre. It was copied in the Tao-Klarjeti region at the Parkhali Monastery by the scribe Gabriel Patarai.

== Description ==
Among surviving Mravaltavi manuscripts, the Parkhali Mravaltavi is notable for its exceptional size. The text is executed in a clear Nuskhuri script using brown-blackish ink. Decorative elements are almost entirely absent throughout the text. The initial capital letters are typically rendered in the same brown ink as the primary text, though red ink is used on rare occasions.

== Provenance and history ==
The manuscript belonged to the Parkhali Monastery until the 15th century. Following the Ottoman expansion into the region, the manuscript fell into Turkish captivity. In the 17th century, it was ransomed and rescued by Queen Mariam of Kartli. To commemorate this event, she left an inscription on folio 197v of the manuscript, which reads:

'Holy [God], remember, O Lord, the faithful sovereign, Patron Queen Mariam.'

The codex was subsequently transferred to the David Gareja monastery complex. While at Gareja Monastery, a zanduki (table of contents) was compiled in the Mkhedruli script. The necessity for creating this index is explained in an accompanying marginal note:

'A zanduki [table of contents] of this book of metaphrastic martyrdoms and holiday readings. Since it was not originally cataloged according to the sequence of the months, but rather written down as it had occurred, not in order, but reversed, I have therefore transcribed it in this manner. I began from September and went through to August, following the count accordingly. This will easily guide you to everything; pray for the poor. In the month of September, on the 26th day, the Life of the Holy Evangelist. On the 27th...'

The manuscript is currently housed at the Korneli Kekelidze Georgian National Centre of Manuscripts in Tbilisi cataloged under collection shelfmark A-95.

== Dating ==
Because the manuscript contains no colophon with a definitive date, its exact period of creation has been a subject of scholarly debate:

- 10th Century: Historian Tedo Zhordania originally attributed the manuscript no later to the 10th century.
- 11th Century: Korneli Kekelidze and Ilia Abuladze later argued that the paleographical and linguistic features pointed to an 11th-century origin.
- Composite 10th Century: A breakthrough by scholar Michel van Esbroeck revealed that the Parkhali Mravaltavi is actually a composite volume consisting of two separate manuscripts artificially bound together, both of which were likely copied in the 10th century.

== Content and structure ==
The Parkhali Mravaltavi contains a mix of both translated and original Georgian literary works. As a liturgical and homiletic miscellany, the anthology exhibits distinct structural characteristics typical of the mravaltavi genre:

- Liturgical Calendar Linkage: The individual texts within the manuscript are intrinsically linked to specific calendar dates, which are explicitly indicated in their respective titles
- Patristic Homilies: The bulk of the contents consists of homilies authored by the Church Fathers.
- Hagiographical Appendix: While standard Mravaltavi compilations less frequently incorporate hagiographical narratives, the Parkhali Mravaltavi is highly unusual in its arrangement. In his scholarly investigation of Georgian homiliaries, Michel van Esbroeck identified the Parkhali manuscript as allegedly the latest of the group he analysed. The manuscript adds about 50 lives and legends immediately following its last standard homily, a sermon by Ioane Bolneli for Palm Sunday titled "On Lazarus and the Lord’s sitting down on the donkey’s foal and his entering Jerusalem and meeting the children." Included among these additions are autochthonous legends of early Georgian saints, most notably the 5th-century foundational text "The Martyrdom of Saint Shushanik" as well as "The Martyrdom of Abo of Tbilisi." The distinct arrangement suggests that this extensive set of texts was not part of the mravaltavi proper, but rather represents a peculiar type of martyrology added to the manuscript secondarily.
