= Yazdan-Friy Shapur =

Sasanian queen

Yazdan-Friy Shapur or Yazdan-Friy-Shabuhr (Middle Persian: yazdān-friy-šābuhr, New Persian: یزدان‌فرای شاپور) was a 4th-century Sasanian queen (banbishn) and the wife of the Sasanian king (shah) Shapur III (r. 383–388). She has been immortalized by an onyx seal of remarkable quality, where she is shown wearing the horns of a ram. The seal is now in the Cabinet des Médailles, France.

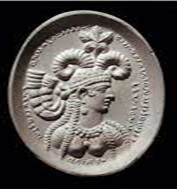
Stamp of Queen Yazdan-Friy-Shabuhr from Cabinet des Médailles, France

== Sources ==
- Muzio, Ciro Lo (2008). "Remarks on the Paintings from the Buddhist Monastery of Fayaz Tepe (Southern Uzbekistan)". Bulletin of the Asia Institute. 22: 189–208.
