= Gabriel Patarai =

10th century Georgian calligrapher

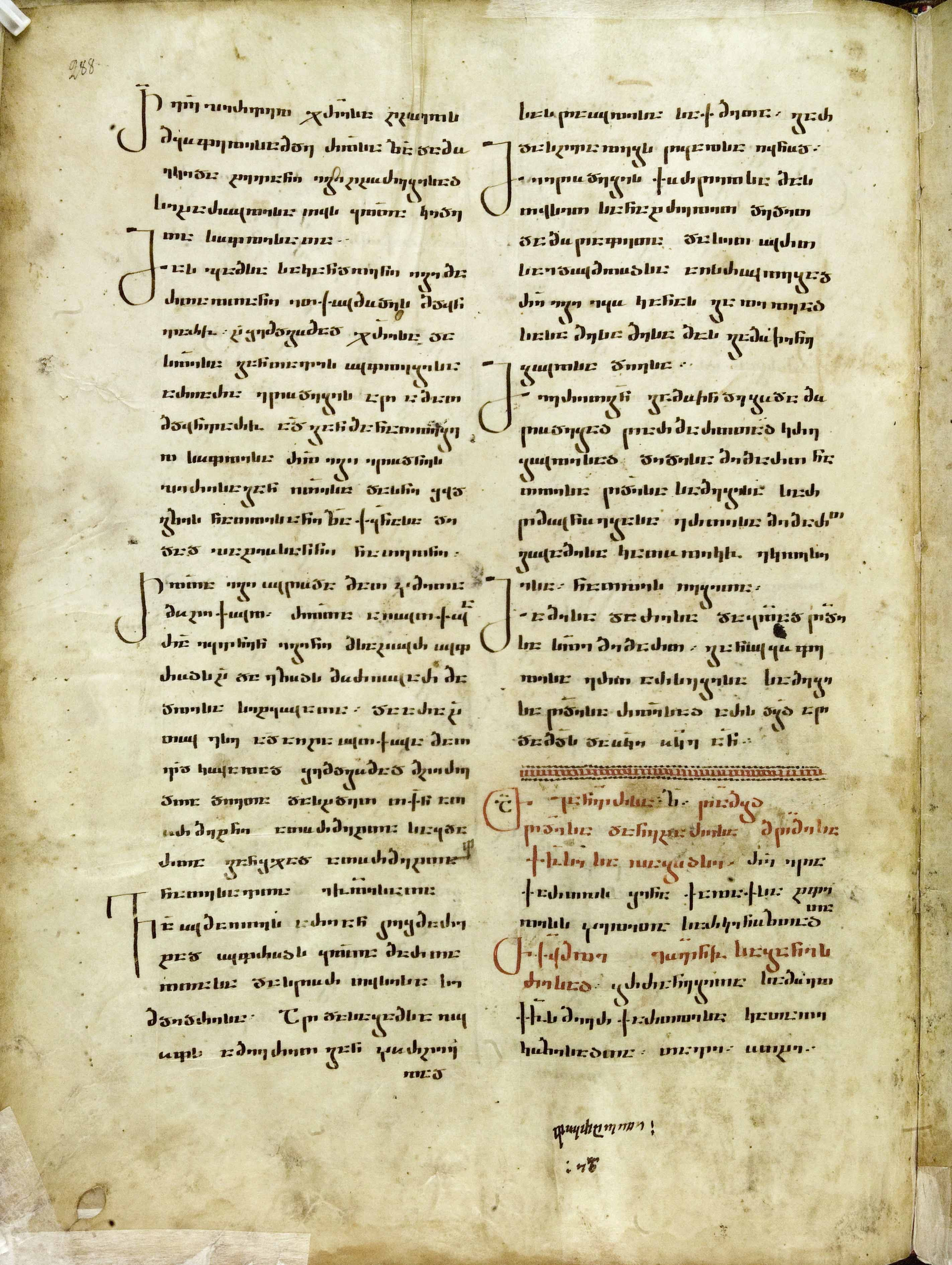
Parkhali Mravaltavi, NCM, A-95, fol. 145v. Text copied by Gabriel Patarai

Gabriel Patarai (Georgian: გაბრიელ პატარაი) was a Georgian calligrapher of the 10th century.

He created his works at the Parkhali monastery of Tao-Klarjeti. His calligraphic works are written in the Nuskhuri script of the Georgian alphabet. The notable works include Parkhali Mravaltavi, a multiple-text compendium.
