= Khanmeti Lectionary =

Manuscript

- New Testament manuscript
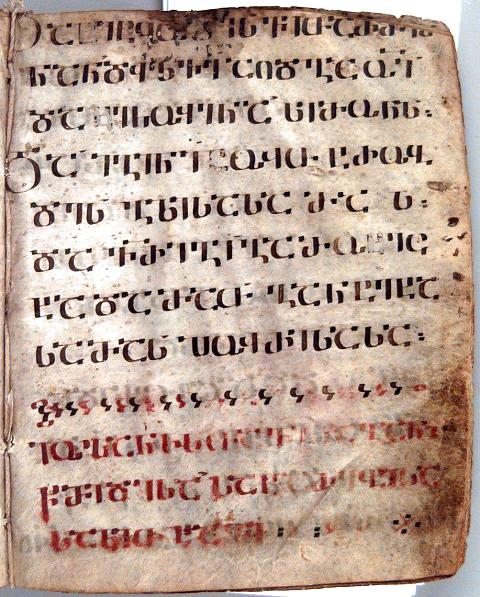
- Name: Khanmeti Lectionary, or Sinai Lectionary
- Text: lectionary
- Date: c. 433-574
- Script: Georgian Majuscule (Asomtavruli)
- Found: 1888
- Now at: University of Graz Library
- Type: Liturgical

The Khanmeti Lectionary, also known as the Sinai Lectionary, is an ancient Georgian manuscript containing Khanmeti versions of New Testament pericopes. It is one of the Georgian manuscripts once preserved at Saint Catherine's Monastery on Sinai, that was later relocated to Austria, Graz.

Today, the primary part of the manuscript is preserved in the University of Graz Library (MS 2058/1). One folio is bound into a manuscript at the Bibliothèque nationale de France (BnF, Géorgien 30), while the folio containing the colophon of Ioane-Zosime, the manuscript’s third binder, is kept in the Birmingham, Cadbury Research Library (Mingana Collection, Georgian 7). According to radiocarbon dating, the codex dates to the 5th–6th centuries AD.

The codex is of particular historical importance as the earliest surviving example of the Jerusalem-rite liturgy.

== Acquisition history and provenance ==
Bibliographic evidence on Graz, UBG, MS 2058/1 indicates that the manuscript was still located at the monastery in 1888. It was subsequently removed and sold on the antiquities market in Cairo, Egypt.

The manuscript was acquired in Cairo by the Austrian Orientalist painter Alfons Leopold Mielich. Mielich’s familiarisation with Egyptian art dealers is documented throughout his oeuvre, works such as The Carpet and Pottery Dealer reflect his frequentation of Cairo's marketplaces and his documented interest in regional antiquities.

In 1897, the Austrian linguist Hugo Schuchardt, then a professor at the University of Graz, purchased the codex directly from Mielich. This transaction, positioning Mielich as the intermediary between the Cairo art market and academia in Graz, is preserved in the correspondence between the painter and the linguist. Schuchardt later acquired the remaining four Georgian manuscripts (Ms 2058/2–5) that complete the collection. Following his death in 1927, Schuchardt bequeathed his entire personal library, including all five Sinai manuscripts, to the University of Graz.

== Codicology and pelaeography of the codex ==
The manuscript has survived in a damaged state, and there are no direct historical records regarding its scribe, the specific date of its creation, or its place of origin.

=== Palaeographical and linguistic dating of the manuscript ===
The initial description of the codex was prepared by Aleksandre Tsagareli (Alexander von Zagareli), who catalogued the manuscript, while it was still on Sinai, and published the description in 1888. Based on paleographical and linguistic features, Akaki Shanidze dated the manuscript to the 7th century.

His analysis suggests that the extant portion of the book was transcribed by two different scribes. It is generally hypothesized that the Khanmeti Lectionary was produced in a Palestinian monastery inhabited by Georgian monks, predating the development of the "Sabatsmida" redaction.

Shanidze argued that for these new "Sabatsmida" norms to take hold, literary schools led by the Great Lavra of Saint Sabbas must have undergone a lengthy period of refinement. This implies that by the time of that linguistic reform, the Khanmeti norms must have faded sufficiently from spoken language for the revision of ancient ecclesiastical texts to be acceptable to the masses.

== Radiocarbon dating ==
In 2024 within the DeLiCaTe project (“The Development of Literacy in the Caucasian Territories”), led by Jost Gippert, at the University of Hamburg, Centre for the Study of Manuscript Cultures, conducted a study on the dating the parchment of the earliest manuscripts using the radiocarbon dating method. In a strategic collaboration with the Federal Institute of Technology (ETH) and the with support by Graz University Library, researchers performed the first systematic radiocarbon (^{14}C) analysis of the parchment from the Khanmeti Lectionary. Using Accelerator Mass Spectrometry (AMS), the laboratory analysis yielded the following chronological data:

- Radiocarbon Age: 1553 ± 21 BP
- Calibrated Date Range: 433–574 calCE
- Statistical highest Peak: 545 calCE

Based on these results, the codex has been securely attributed to the V–VI centuries CE.

== Publication History and Major Editions ==
=== The Editio Princeps (1944) ===
The text of the Khanmeti Lectionary was first brought to light and published by the prominent Georgian linguist and philologist Akaki Shanidze in 1944. Published in Tbilisi under the title ხანმატი ლექციონარი (Khanmeti Lectionary) as the inaugural volume of the landmark series Dzveli kartuli enis dzeglebi ("Monuments of the Old Georgian Language"), this edition included a phototypic reproduction of the manuscript alongside a comprehensive concordance (symponia).

=== The Comprehensive Edition (2004) ===
The most complete and authoritative printed edition of the text to date was prepared by Vakhtang Imnaishvili in 2004. Published under the title Udvelesi kartuli khelnatserebi avstriashi ("The Oldest Georgian Manuscripts in Austria"), this work contextualized the lectionary within the broader scope of early Georgian codices preserved in European collections, specifically focusing on materials housed in Austria.

=== Digital Edition (TITUS) ===
A digitized, lemmatized online version of the Khanmeti Lectionary is hosted by the TITUS project at the Goethe University Frankfurt. This digital recension was developed using Imnaishvili's 2004 comprehensive edition as a base text, but was systematically cross-referenced and corrected using direct digital images of the original codex to ensure high palaeographical accuracy.

== Sources ==
- Gippert, Jost (2025). Georgian Palaeography Revisited: Dating Undated Manuscripts. Digital Kartvelology, 4, 5–28. https://doi.org/10.62235/dk.4.2025.10506.
- Bosch, Sebastian; Kvirkvelia, Eka (2025). Georgian Manuscripts from the Graz and Leipzig Collections: Results of Ink Analysis. Digital Kartvelology, 4. https://doi.org/10.62235/dk.4.2025.10507.
- უტიე, ბერნარ (1973). ქართული ხანმეტი ლექციონარის ერთი ფურცელი პარიზში, მაცნე, ენისა და ლიტერატურის სერია, 1.
- გარიტი, ჟერარ (1973). მინგანას კოლექციის ქართული ფურცლები, მაცნე, ენისა და ლიტერატურის სერია, 3.
- შანიძე, აკაკი (1929). ქართული ხელნაწერები გრაცში, ტფილისის უნივერსიტეტის მოამბე [Bulletin de l’Université de Tiflis], 9, 310–353.
- შანიძე, აკაკი (1944). ხანმეტი ლექციონარი, ძველი ქართული ენის ძეგლები, I.
