= Parkhali =

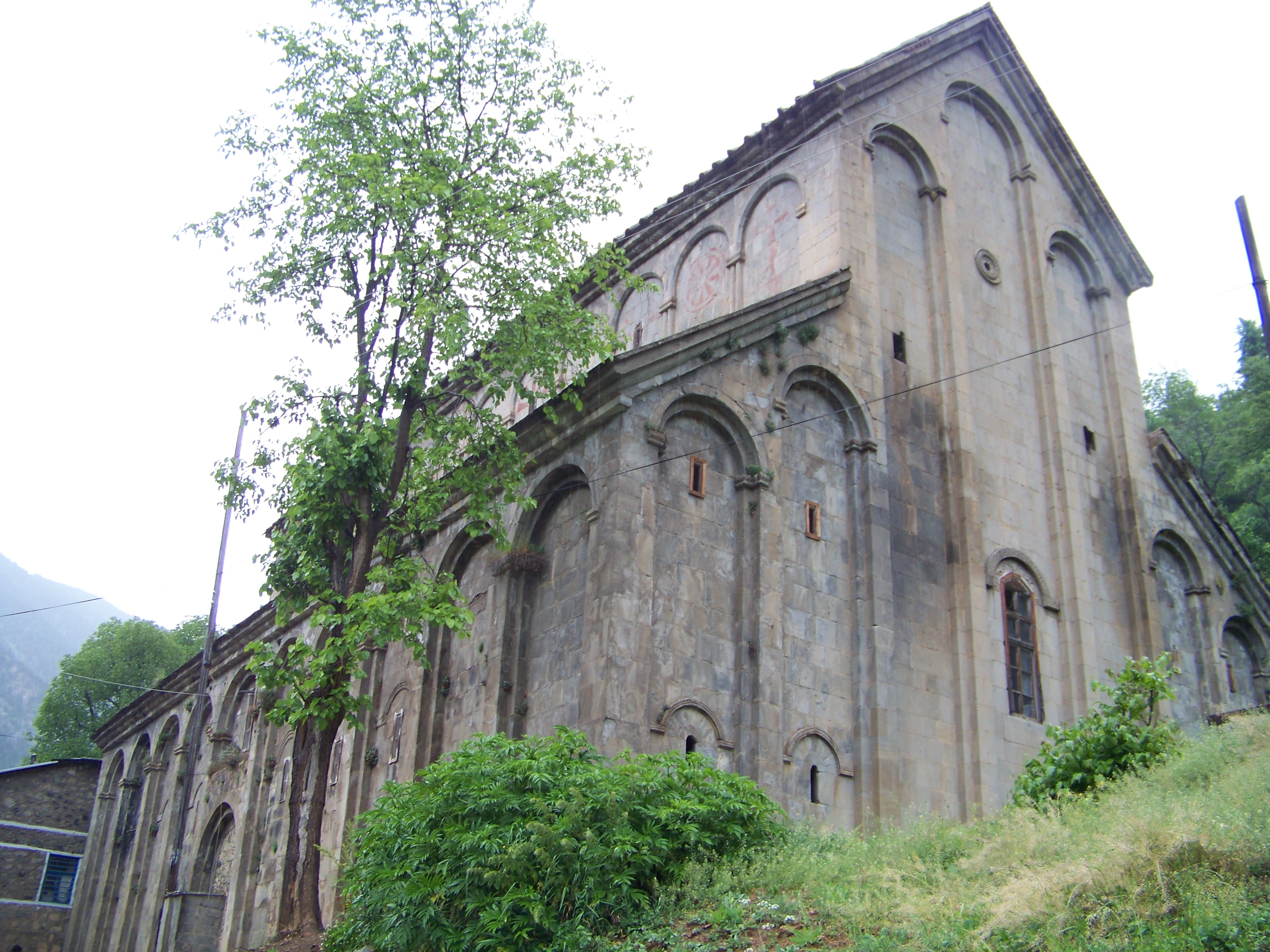

- Location within Turkey

Religion
- Affiliation: Georgian Orthodox Church; Sunni Islam
- District: Yusufeli
- Province: Artvin
- Region: Tao (historical region)
- Status: Church (973-1677); Mosque (1677-present)

Location
- Location: Yusufeli, Artvin province, Turkey
- Country: Turkey
- Coordinates: 40°58′13″N 41°23′01″E

Architecture
- Founder: Gregory of Khandzta
- Completed: 973

Altıparmak
- Village
- Location within Turkey
- Country: Turkey
- Province: Artvin
- District: Yusufeli
- Population (2021): 399
- Time zone: UTC+3 (TRT)

Parkhali (Georgian: პარხალი), also known in Turkish as Barhal or Altıparmak, is a village that contains a medieval Georgian monastery and cathedral church. It is located near the town of Yusufeli, Artvin Province, Turkey, and part of Yusufeli District.

== History ==
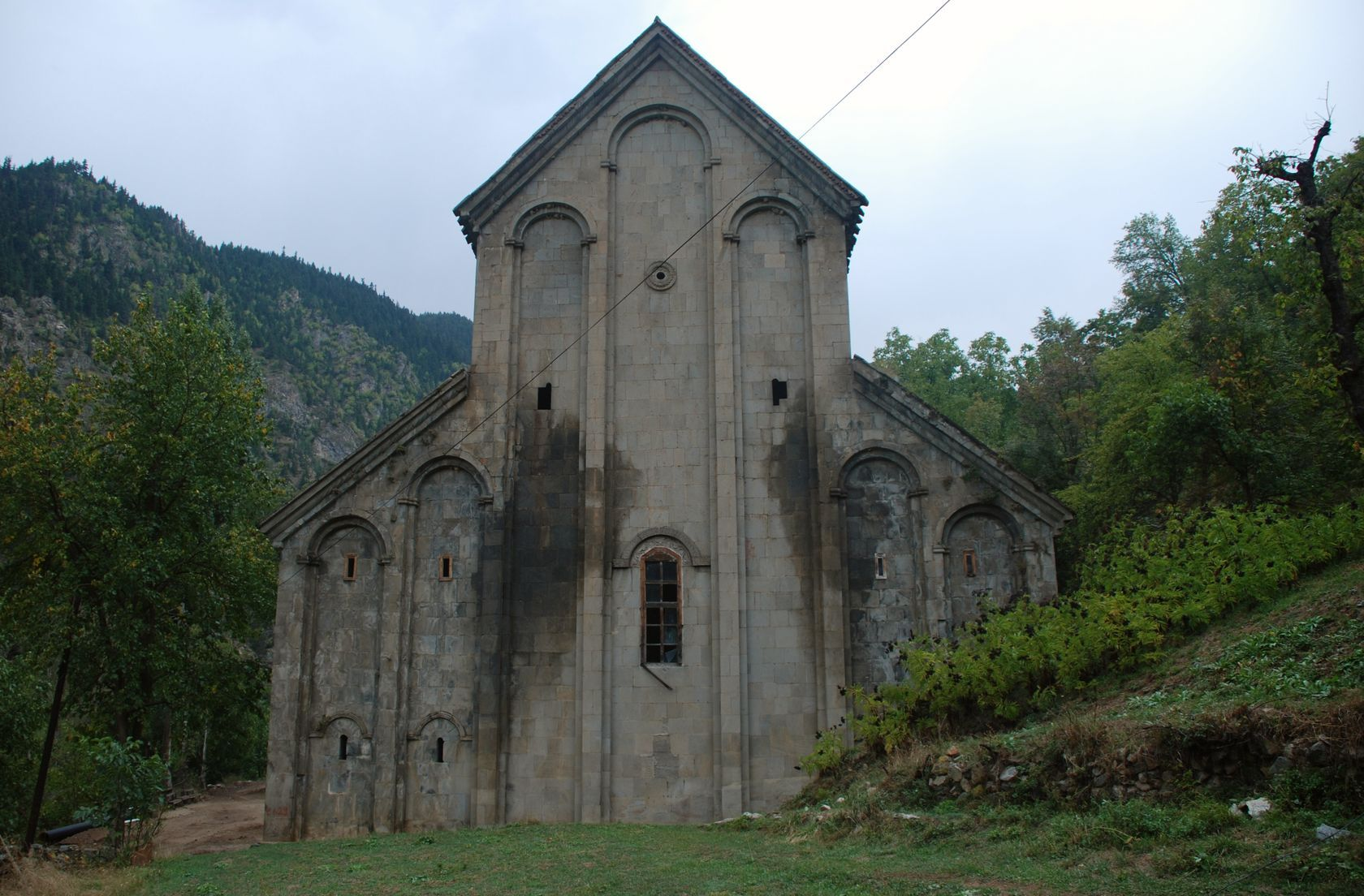
The eastern side of the church.

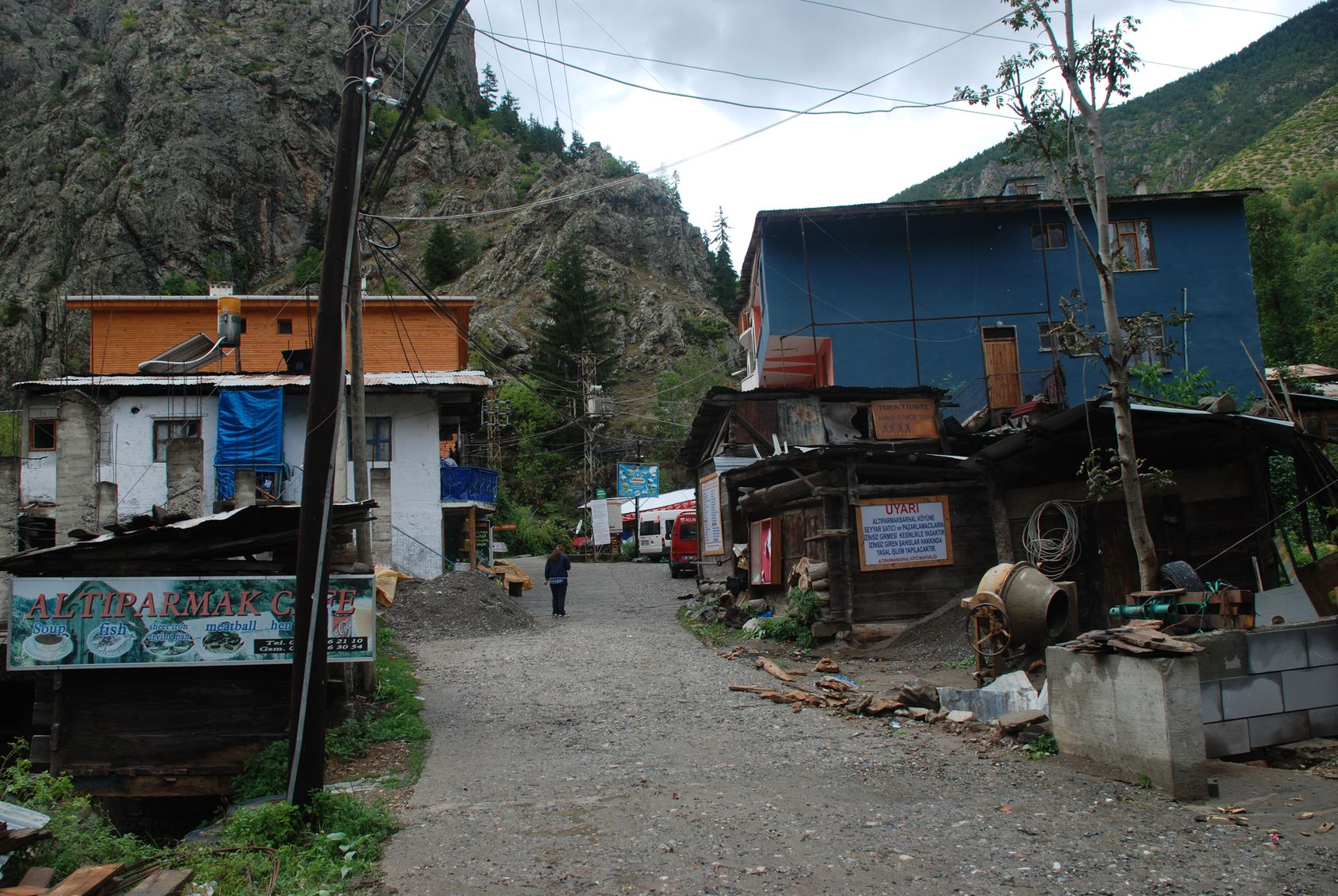
The current village of Barhal/Altıparmak.

The monastery and cathedral church was built by Davit III Kurapalat (earlier than 973) and decorated with murals.

The manuscript Parkhali Mravaltavi, which also comprises Georgian hagiographial texts, Martyrdom of the Holy Queen Shushanik among others, was copied in that monastery by the scribe Gabriel Patarai.

The main church of the monastery was converted into a mosque in 1677.

== Population ==
As of 2021, the village had a population of 399 people.
