= Klimova Treasure =

Archaeological discovery in Russia

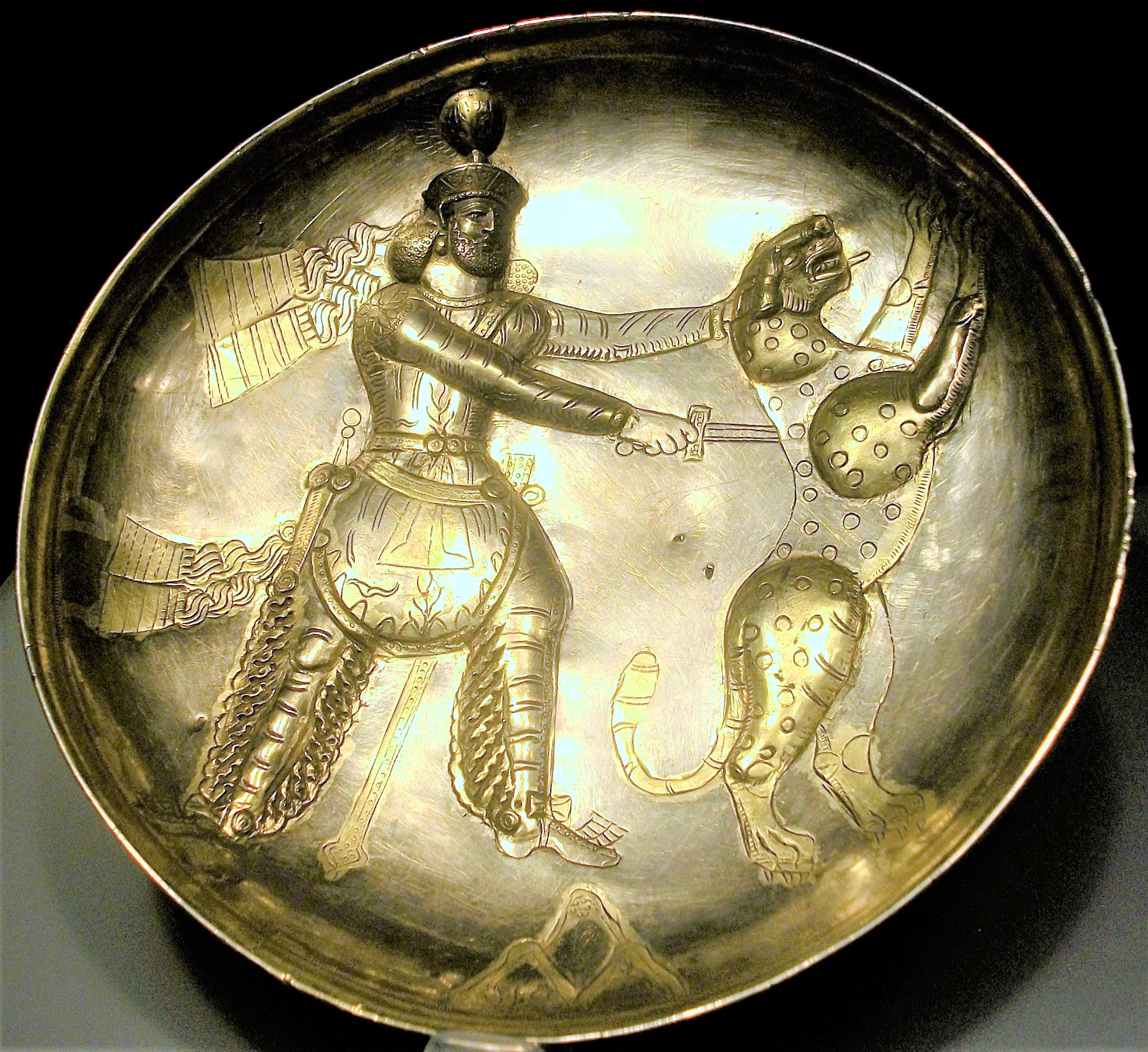
The "Klimova Plate", depicting Sasanian monarch Shapur III killing a leopard

The Klimova Treasure is a hoard of Early Byzantine and Sasanian silver objects that was discovered in 1907 near the village of Klimova in the Perm Governorate of the Russian Empire (modern-day Perm Krai, in central Russia). It is one of several hoards of Byzantine and Sasanian silverware uncovered in that region, which are collectively referred to as the Perm Treasures.

== Description ==
Amongst the Byzantine objects from the Klimova Treasure are a dish containing an image of a goatherd which bears the silver stamps of Emperor Justinian I (r. 527–565) and two 7th-century dishes adorned with crosses. The Sasanian objects from the hoard include a dish depicting King of Kings Shapur III (r. 383–388) slaying a leopard, as well as another which portrays a tigress beneath a tree. Other works associated with the Klimova Treasure also include an 8th or 9th century Iranian dish and a Mawarannahr piece. A bucket was also found. The Klimova Treasure is currently housed in the collections of the Hermitage Museum in Saint Petersburg.
