= Peroz (Mihranid) =

Peroz (Middle Persian: 𐭯𐭩𐭫𐭥𐭰, "the Victor") was bidaxsh (vice-king) of Gogarene and Gardman, ruling from 330 to 361. He was the founder of the Mihranid dynasty, an offshoot of the House of Mihran, one of the seven Parthian clans.

He was the son-in-law of Mirian III, a convert to Christianity, who belonged to the Chosroid dynasty, which was also an offshoot of the House of Mihran. Peroz eventually himself converted to Christianity during his rule in Caucasus. Peroz later died in 361, and was succeeded in Gardman by his son Khurs, and in Gogarene by an unnamed son, who was later succeeded in 394 by Bakur I.

== Sources ==
- Toumanoff, Cyril (1963). Studies in Christian Caucasian history. Georgetown University Press. pp. 1–599.
- Pourshariati, Parvaneh (2008). Decline and Fall of the Sasanian Empire: The Sasanian-Parthian Confederacy and the Arab Conquest of Iran. London and New York: I.B. Tauris. ISBN 978-1-84511-645-3.
- Toumanoff, Cyril (1969). The Chronology of the Early Kings of Iberia. Fordham University Press. pp. 1–33.

Preceded by Gusharids	Mihranid prince of Gardman; 330-361	Succeeded by Khurs
