= Shushanik =

Armenian Christian martyr (c. 440–475)

Saint Shushanik
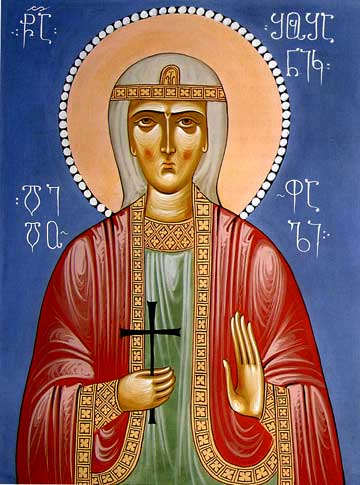

Great martyr, Queen
- Born: c. 440; Armenia
- Died: October 17th, 475 (age 34-35); Tsurtavi, Georgia
- Venerated in: Eastern Orthodox Church; Armenian Apostolic Church; Eastern Catholic Churches
- Feast: October 17 (Eastern Orthodox), September 20–26 (Armenian Apostolic and Eastern Catholic)

Shushanik (Armenian: Շուշանիկ; Georgian: შუშანიკი; c. 440 – 475), also known as Shushanika or Vardandukht, was a Christian Armenian woman who was tortured to death by her husband Varsken in the town of Tsurtavi, Georgia. Since she died defending her right to profess Christianity, she is regarded as a martyr. Her martyrdom is described in her confessor Jacob’s hagiographic work, the oldest extant work of Georgian language literature. The hagiography details Shushanik's extensive resistance to imprisonment, isolation, torture and cruelty.

According to this legend, Shushanik was a daughter of the Armenian military commander Vardan Mamikonian and married the Mihranid ruler (pitiakhsh) Varsken, son of Arshusha II. Varsken was a defiant vassal of Vakhtang I Gorgasali, King of Kartli (Iberia), and took a pro-Persian position, renouncing Christianity and adopting Zoroastrianism. He killed Shushanik after she refused to submit to his order to abandon her Christian faith. Varsken himself was killed by King Vakhtang in 482.

Shushanik has been canonized by the Georgian Orthodox Church and is venerated by the Armenian Apostolic Church. Her feast day is celebrated on October 17 in Georgia and the Tuesday between September 20–26 in Armenia.

== Gallery ==
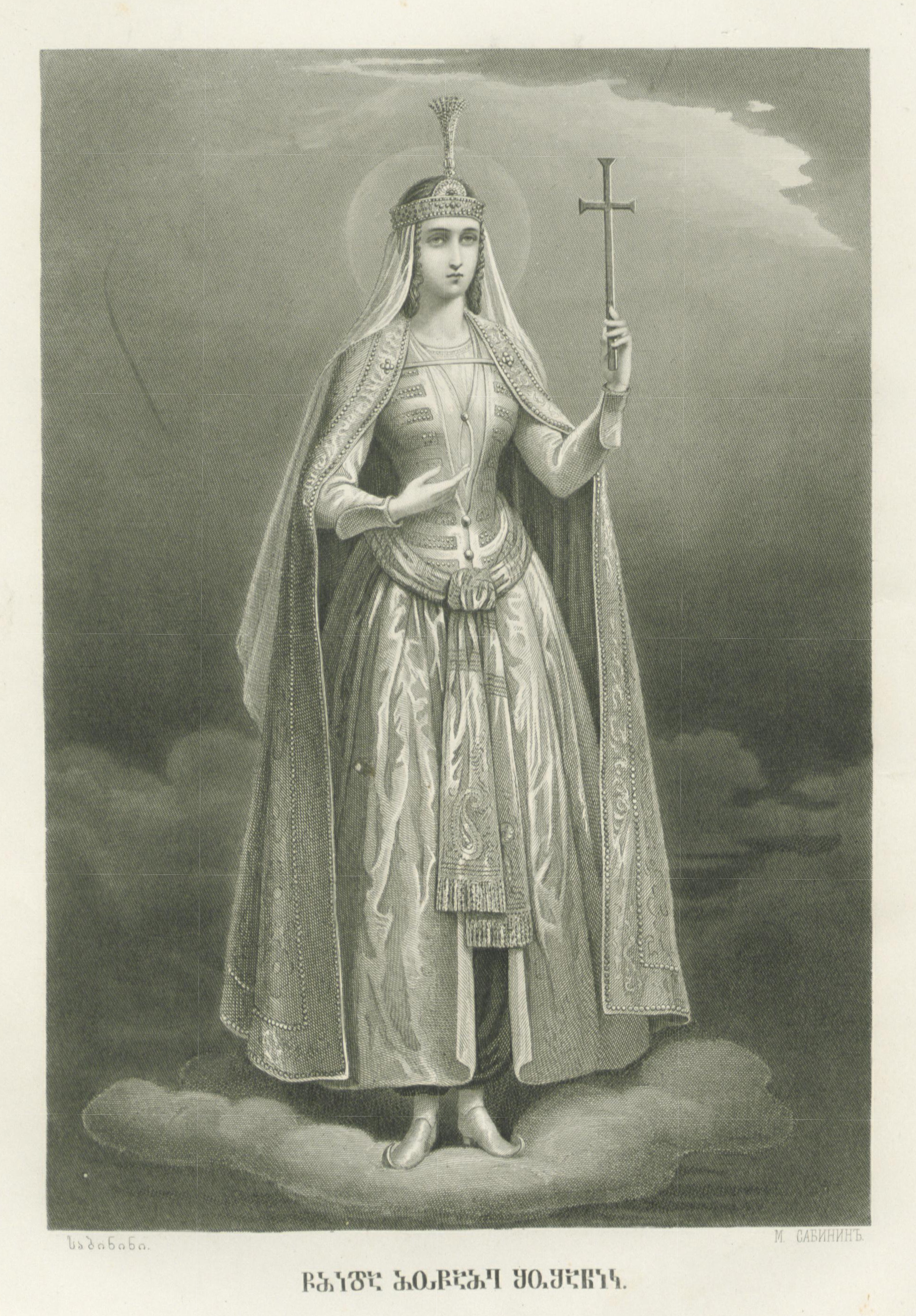
A 19th century illustration of Shusanik

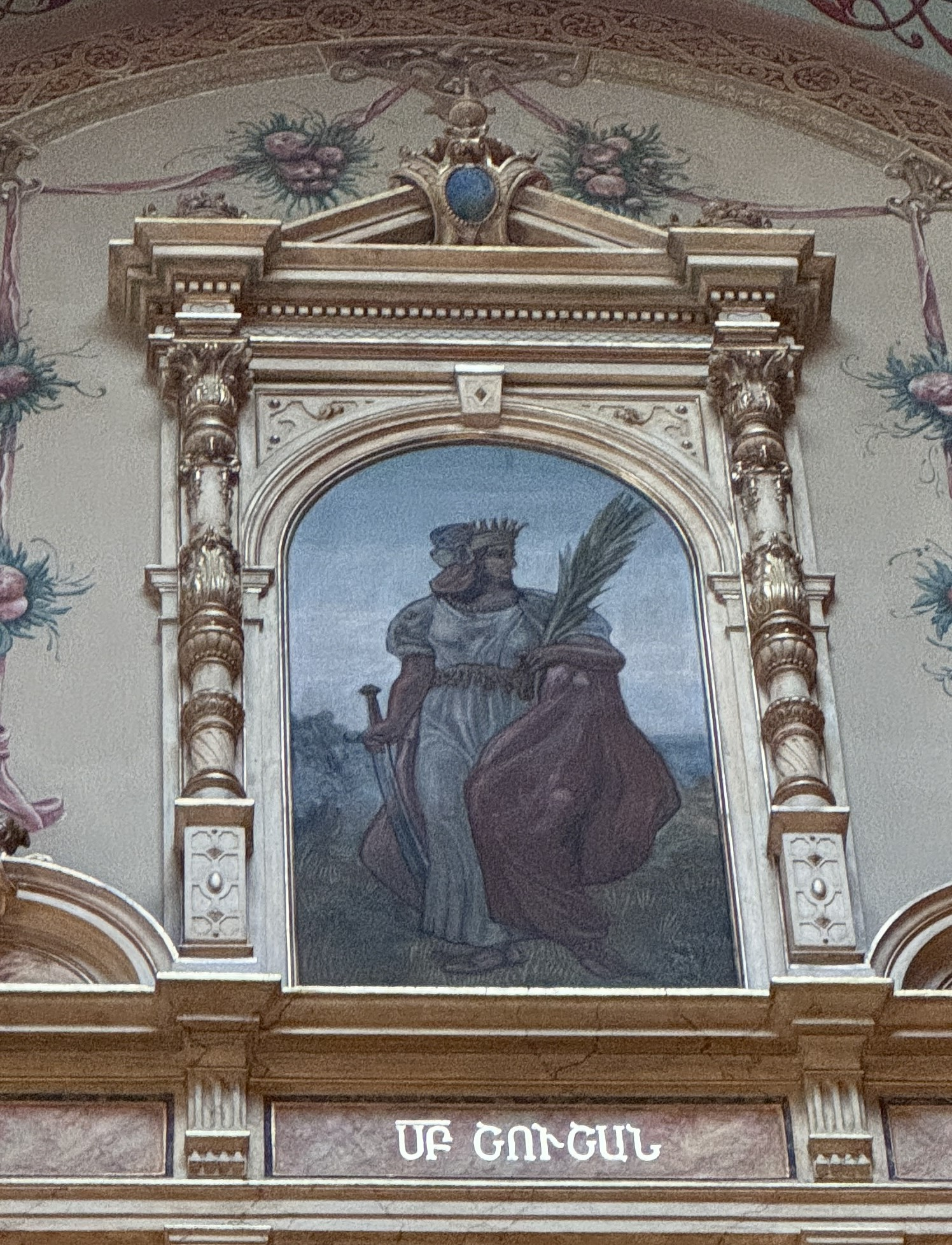
Inside the Mekhitarist church in Vienna
