= Old Georgian prefix =

Grammar of the Georgian language

Old Georgian prefix (Georgian: ძველქართულის პრეფიქსი, romanized: dzvelkartulis p'repiksi) refers to Old Georgian linguistic prefix classifications based on specific morphological features that is known as khanmeti and haemeti standard. Linguistically it refers to written sources, originally dated to 5th–9th centuries CE, in which the prefix kh- (x-) is predominant as the marker for the second person subject and third person object. The kh- (x-) prefix is also found in the comparative degree forms of adjectives and adverbs, as well as in passive voice verbs utilizing the i- prefix. Conversely, texts that employ h- (ჰ-) in these same morphological contexts are designated as haemeti.

== Identification and terminology ==
The academic foundation for identifying and understanding linguistic layers for Khanmeti and Haemeti texts was established in the early 20th century through the work of Akaki Shanidze. In 1920, he published his monograph, "The subjective prefix of the second person and the objective prefix of the third person in Georgian verbs" (in Georgian). In this work, he highlighted the presence of the kh- (ხ-) prefix as a marker for the second person subject in specific verb forms, such as kh-ar (thou art), (mo)-kh-ual (thou wilt come), and (mo)-kh-ued (thou didst come).

Furthering this research in 1923, Shanidze published "Traces of the Use of the Third Person Objective Prefix Before Vowels in Georgian Verbs" (in Georgian) in the second volume of the Bulletin of Tbilisi University. In this study, the author proposed that the kh- prefix was also originally used to mark the third person subject. To support this hypothesis, he cited:

- Deverbal Nouns: Specifically the toponym Khertvisi (ხ-ე-რთ-ვ-ი-ს).
- Epigraphic Evidence: Archaic verbal forms found in the Mtskheta and Bolnisi inscriptions, such as kheyav (ხეყავ), shekhetsie (შეხეწიე), and shekhuabt (შეხუაბთ).

These findings were instrumental in defining the "Khanmeti" period as a distinct chronological and linguistic stage in the evolution of the Georgian language.

The term Khanmeti first appears in the colophon of the Georgian four gospels revised by George the Hagiorite. The term Haemeti was created with the alnaology of Khanmeti by the scholar Akaki Shanidze, who was among the first scholars who studied the sources.

== Dating ==
The application of radiocarbon (^{14}C) analysis to Old Georgian manuscripts in 2024 has reshaped the understanding of early Caucasian literacy. Historically, scholars were divided on whether the linguistic features of Khanmeti and Haemeti represented distinct historical eras or merely regional variations. For over a century, the dominant theory proposed by Ivane Javakhishvili suggested a linear chronology: Khanmeti was assigned to the 5th–6th centuries, while Haemeti was believed to have succeeded it in the 7th–8th centuries.

Recent scientific testing conducted by the DeLiCaTe project led by Jost Gippert at ETH Zurich has provided evidence that supports the 1923 hypothesis of Akaki Shanidze. The data reveal that these linguistic distinctions were regional or dialectal rather than chronological. Key findings from the study include: Antiquity of Haemeti: The famous Sinai Lectionary (MS 2058/1), which contains haemeti forms, was previously dated to the 7th or 8th century based on its linguistic markers. Radiocarbon dating has pushed this timeline back to the 5th–6th centuries (433–574 calCE), proving that Haemeti and Khanmeti existed simultaneously. By moving beyond the limitations of undated colophons and purely palaeographical guesswork, radiocarbon dating has established that the "kh-" and "h-" prefixes were used by different scribal traditions during the same period.

== Documents ==
The following documents represent the primary milestones of this period.

=== Inscriptions ===
- Bolnisi Inscriptions
- Ukangori Inscriptions
- Jvari Inscriptions

=== Manuscripts ===
- Khanmeti Lectionary
- Old Testament, Jeremiah (Cambridge Palimpsest)
- Khanmeti 'Mravaltavi'
- Psalms (XH, lower ladyer of Sin. georg. NF 84 and 90)
- Protoevangelium James
- Khanmeti Gospels (NCM, A-89 and A-844)
- Makhachkala Gospels
