= Martyrdom of Abo of Tbilisi =

8th-century Christian martyrdom text

The Martyrdom of Abo of Tbilisi is an eighth-century-AD Christian martyrdom text written by Ioane Sabanisdze. It describes the religious conversion and subsequent persecution of Abo, an Arab who converted to Christianity at Kartli and then was martyred at Tbilisi, which was under Islamic rule.

== Background ==
In the 640s, the Arabs first entered the Georgian region through frequent raids until a three-year truce was conceived with the Byzantine Empire to suspend hostilities. The region though would be invaded in 645–46 with an even larger Arab force led by general Habib ibn Maslama al-Fihri who eventually gave the Arabs complete control of the region of what is now Georgia, Armenia, and Caucasian Albania under the Muslim province Arminiya by leading his army through the region all the way to Tbilisi and having prince Stephen II of Iberia surrender. Tbilisi then became the secondary capital of Arminiya while Dvin was the primary one, but the Arabs ruled the region indirectly throughout the seventh century. It was not until the eighth century that the Arabs reinserted their dominance over the region after suppressing a rebellion which took place at Georgia in the 770s. The rebellion was initiated by Georgian and Armenian aristocrats who went against the Abbasid Caliphate Al-Mansur. The rebels were led by Christian prince Nerse who would then be arrested and imprisoned where Abo's martyrdom begins, Baghdad.

== Structure and content ==
The Martyrdom of Abo of Tbilisi consists of four chapters in two letters exchanged between Ioane Sabanisdze and the Catholicos Samoel. The first chapter provides an analysis of Kartli's economic, political, and religious circumstances under Arab domination in an eschatological perspective that would effect Abo's martyrdom. The author also uses a homily on Baptism by Amphilochius of Iconium in an exegetical part of the chapter. The second and third chapter continues with the beginning of Abo's journey starting with him meeting the imprisoned regiment Christian prince Nerse whom he later travels with on their return to Kartli; Abo encounters Christians for the first time; he travels to Khazaria and is baptized then travels to Abkhazia and fights evil; a dialogue with the Abkhazia prince before returning to Kartli; his encounter with Arabs at Tbilisi and the date of his martyrdom presented in historical contextualization. Abo is for the first time arrested but is released, however, the new emir denounces Abo's Christian faith. And before leaving town, Abo warns the Christians before he debates the emir and is imprisoned again; he struggles against evil. Abo makes preparations for his martyrdom and is martyred after a final debate with the emir; a miracle occurs after his martyrdom, and in the final chapter, in rhymed prose, a eulogy of Abo.

== Manuscript history ==
The Martyrdom of Abo of Tbilisi was written near the eighth century by high-ranking clergyman Ioane Sabanisdze who lived in Tbilisi and claims to have known Abo personally and to have actually witnessed the martyrdom. Other than that, there is no further information concerning Ioane Sabanisdze. Different literary sources were used by the author to produce the Martyrdom of Abo as a distinguished and original work which influenced the development of Georgian literature, and the author wrote the text to help establish Georgian nationality by using the tragic history of Abo. The text now survives in several manuscripts dated from the ninth century to the eleventh century and are all written in the Georgian language. It also circulated far beyond the Georgian region into the Byzantine Empire and in the Holy Land by Georgians living outside of their native homeland as manuscripts were evidently found at Mount Sinai and Mount Athos. Abo is also mentioned in Georgian liturgical and historical texts.

== Significance ==
The authenticity of the Martyrdom of Abo is undisputed and is one of the earliest known texts to first use the Georgian language in writing. It is also the first Georgian work to provide theological arguments against Islam and further provides both literary and historical documentation concerning Kartli and the surrounding towns in the second half of the eighth century; it provides information about the period for which sources are scarce and elaborates the social, political, and cultural aspects of a Christian country under Arab dominants.

== Bibliography ==
- Casiday, Augustine (2012). The Orthodox Christian World. Routledge. ISBN 9781136314841.
- McGuckin, John Anthony (2010). The Encyclopedia of Eastern Orthodox Christianity. John Wiley & Sons. ISBN 9781444392548.
- Sahner, Christian C. (2020). Christian Martyrs Under Islam: Religious Violence and the Making of the Muslim World. Princeton University Press. ISBN 9780691203133.
- Thomas, David; Roggema, Barbara (2009). Christian-Muslim Relations: A Bibliographical History. BRILL. ISBN 9789004169753.
