= Gugark =

Historical province of Greater Armenia

Coordinates: 41.0667°N 44.4333°E

Գուգարք
- Province of the ancient kingdom of Armenia
- 189 BC–387 AD
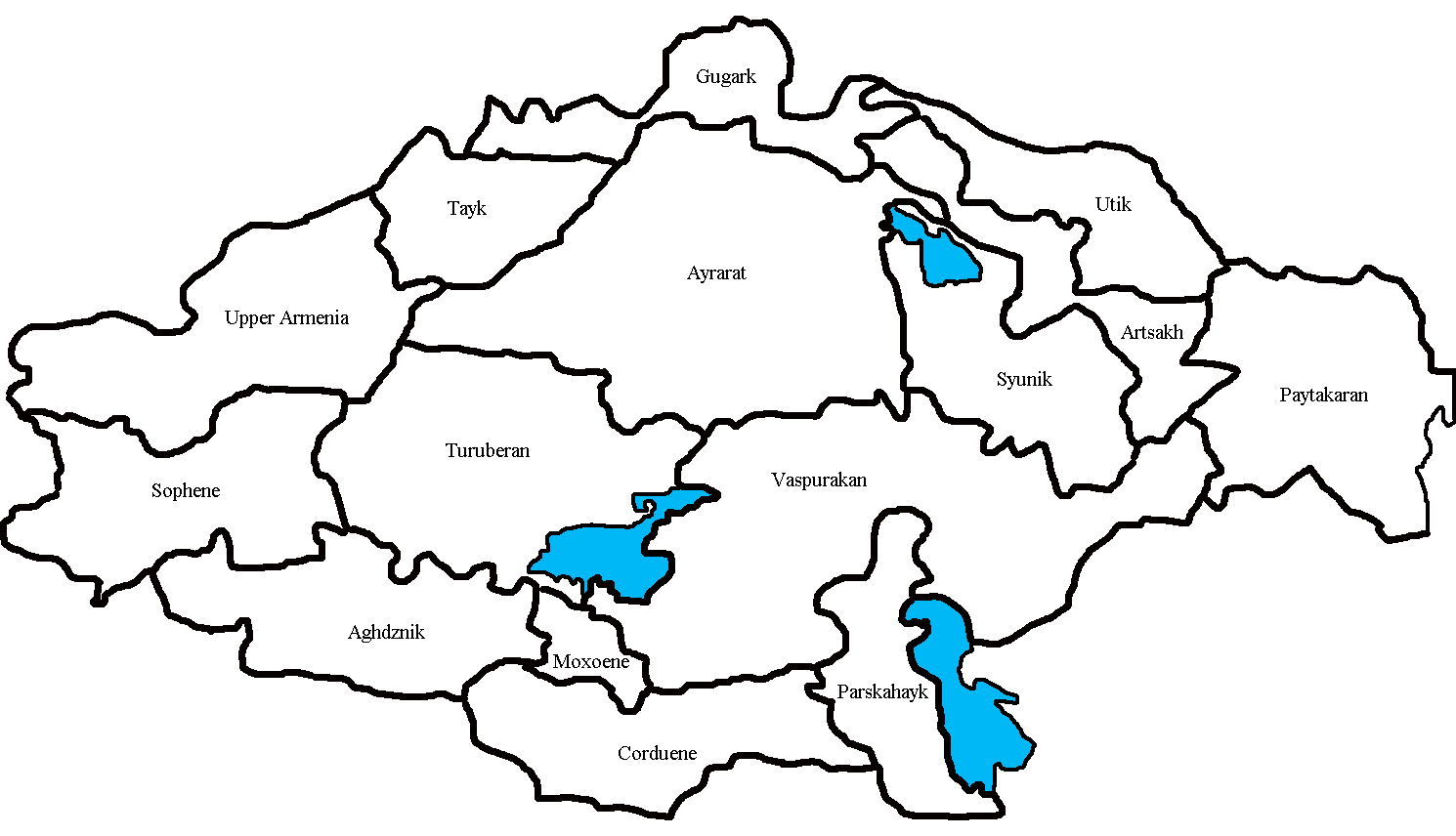
- Capital: Ardahan
- History
  - Artaxias I declaring himself independent: 189 BC
  - Disestablished: 387 AD
- Today part of: Armenia; Turkey; Georgia

Gugark (Armenian: Գուգարք, Latin: Gogarene, Ancient Greek: Γογαρινή) was the 13th province of the ancient kingdom of Armenia. It now comprises parts of northern Armenia, northeast Turkey, and southwest Georgia.

== History ==
In ancient Urartian inscriptions dating to 785 BC, the territory of Gugark is referred to as Zabaha, which is known today as Javakheti (Javakhk in Armenian). In the beginning of IV century BC, (302BC) the territory was under Caucasian Iberia, but during Artaxias I's reign it was conquered. During the reign of the Artaxiad and Arshakuni kings of Armenia, Gugark was ruled by one of the kingdom's four bdeashkhs. The bdeashkh of Gugark was responsible for protecting the state's northern border. During the 4th century, the region was ruled by members of a branch of the House of Mihran. In 387, Armenia was partitioned between the Byzantine and Sassanid empires and Gugark, with the exception of the canton of Tashir, was annexed to Caucasian Iberia. The ruler of the region around 425 was Arshusha. In 652, the Armenian prince Theodore Rshtuni was allowed by the Arabs to unite Gugark with his realms.

Map of Arshakuni Armenia, around the year 150 AD

In the following centuries, Gugark and its cantons fell under the sway of several rulers. In the 8th century, it became a part of Emirate of Tbilisi. In the middle of the 9th century, it was taken by the Georgian Bagrationis, while the Armenian Bagratunis took over its eastern cantons.

=== Strabo ===
Strabo commented:

Armenia, though a small country in earlier times, was enlarged by Artaxias and Zariadris, who formerly were generals of Antiochus the Great, but later, after his defeat, reigned as kings (the former as king of Sophenê, Acisenê, Odomantis, and certain other countries, and the latter as king of the country round Artaxata), and jointly enlarged their kingdoms by cutting off for themselves parts of the surrounding nations, — I mean by cutting off Caspianê and Phaunitis and Basoropeda from the country of the Medes; and the country along the side of Mt Paryadres and Chorzenê and Gogarenê, which last is on the far side of the Cyrus River, from that of the Iberians; and Carenitis and Xerxenê, which border on Lesser Armenia or else parts of it, from that of the Chalybians and the Mosynoeci; and Acilisenê and the country round the Antitaurus from that of the Cataonians; and Taronitis from that of the Syrians; and therefore they all speak the same language, as we are told.

Analyzing this statement in detail, C. Toumanoff concludes that it does not necessarily refer to the entire territory of Gugark, since many of its regions were never part of Iberia. According to Toumanoff, a number of the southern gavars of Gugark originally constituted part of Armenia. R. Hewsen shares the same view.

== Inhabitants ==
Giorgi Melikishvili believed that Gugark was, ethnically, a mixed Armenian-Georgian region. This view is supported by Anatoly Novoseltsev. The Cambridge Ancient History also considers Gugark a region where two peoples, Armenians and Georgians, mingled.

== Cantons ==
- Dzoropor
- Tsobopor
- Treghk
- Artahan
- Javakhk
- Upper Javakhk
- Tashir
- Kangark
- Kagharjk
- Nigal
- Mrugh
- Mrit
- Shavshet
- Koghbopor
- Kvishapor
- Boghnopor
- Tashran
- Manglyats
- Ashotsk

== List of bdeashkhs ==
Based on available sources, Cyril Toumanoff deduced an incomplete list of the ruling Mihranid bdeashkhs of Gugark.

Name	Reign
Peroz	330–361?
Bakur I	after 394–430
Arshusha I	after 430–?
Bakur II	mid 5th-century
Arshusha II	?–470
Varsken	470–482
Arshusha III	482–after 540/1
Arshusha IV	ca. first decade of the 7th-century
Vahram-Arshusha V	late 620s
Arshusha VI	mid 8th-century

== See also ==
- Shushanik
