= Bidaxsh =

Noble and military title of Iranian origin used in Antiquity

Bidaxsh (bidakhsh, also spelled pitiakhsh; in Roman sources: vitaxa) was a title of Iranian origin attested in various languages from the 1st to the 8th century. It has no identical word in English, but it is similar to a margrave, toparch and marcher lord. The etymology of the term is disputed, and it has been interpreted as literally meaning "the eye of the king," "second ruler" or "vice king." The word was borrowed into Armenian as bdeashkh (բդեաշխ), and into Georgian as pitiaxshi (პიტიახში) and patiaxshi (პატიახში).

The title was prominent in Armenia and Georgia, being used by the military governor of a province, and being the hereditary title of the dynasts of Gugark.

== In Armenia ==
As Robert H. Hewsen explains, the bdeshkhut‘iwn-k‘ (vitaxates) of the Kingdom of Greater Armenia were "large military viceroyalties serving as defense zones to protect the kingdom from foreign invasion." Cyril Toumanoff writes that the bdeashkhs (plural: bdeashkhk‘) of Armenia likely emerged as a result of the conquests of Tigranes the Great (r. 95–55 BC), fulfilling the role of viceroys tasked with protecting the newly conquered border territories. However, Hewsen argues that the institution was a later development, potentially datable to the reign of the Arsacid king Vologases I of Armenia (r. 117–140). The bdeashkhs of Armenia may have once been independent dynastic rulers who were vassalized by the king of Armenia. In their capacity as "marcher-lords" the bdeashkhs are also called "keepers" (sahmanakal) and "guardians" (sahmanapah) of the borders in the 5th-century Armenian histories Buzandaran Patmut‘iwnk‘ and the History of Agathangelos.

In the hierarchy of the Armenian nobility, the bdeashkhs had precedence over all other magnates. The extent of their authority is unclear. Hewsen writes, "In some cases, under certain conditions, the existence of these vitaxates might have meant the imposition of the authority of the vitaxa upon other princes within his jurisdiction, as Toumanoff suggests, but of this we are poorly informed." The significance of the bdeashkhs was still remembered after the fall of the Arsacid Armenian kingdom in 428, as is reflected in number of knights attributed to them in the Zōrnamak ("Military List"), an antiquarian compilation from the 6th–8th centuries which preserves some genuine data from the Arsacid period on the military contingents of the Armenian nobility. However, the title of bdeashkh, presumably along with the institution, ceased to exist not long after the fall of the Armenian kingdom. A bdeashkh of Ałdznik is mentioned in the context of the mid-5th century by the 5th–6th-century historian Lazar Parpetsi: during the Armenian rebellion of 450–451 against the Sasanian Empire, the Armenian rebels appealed to the bdeashkh of Ałdznik for assistance as a foreign ruler. Lazar also attests to the continuing existence of the bdeashkh of Gugark.

The precise borders of the vitaxates are not totally certain, and the identification of one vitaxate has been a matter of scholarly dispute. According to Cyril Toumanoff, the four vitaxates were those of Nor Shirakan (New Siracene), Ałdznik (Arzanene), Tsopk (Sophene), and Gugark (Gogarene). Hewsen rejects Toumanoff's (originally Josef Markwart's) identification of Sophene (with the larger territory of the once-independent kingdom of Sophene) as one of the vitaxates. This vitaxate was known as the Vitaxate of Asorestan, the "Assyrian March"; Markwart and Toumanoff believed Asorestan 'Assyria' was an error for Asorik‘ 'Syria'; that is, the vitaxate was the "Syrian March", meant to defend the Armenian border with Seleucid Syria and, later, with the Roman Empire. Hewsen asserts that this vitaxate really was the "Assyrian March", centered on Korduk and created to protect Armenia from an invasion from the Tigris Valley. In Hewsen's view, the Romans (suzerains over Armenia for much of the Arsacid period) would not have tolerated an Armenian military viceroyalty right on the Roman–Armenian frontier.

The Vitaxate of Gugark, also known as the Iberian March, (Note: In the Armenian Agathangelos, the bdeashkh of Gugark is also called the "other bdeashkh" (§795); he is identified with the "bdeashkh of Mask‘ut‘k‘" mentioned in another passage of Agathangelos (§873). Here, Maskutk is thought to refer to Meschians or Moschians of neighboring Meskhetia and not to the Massagetae further afield (see Maskut).) was located in the north on the Armenian border with the Georgian kingdom of Iberia. Toumanoff equated its territory with that of the province of Gugark as it is described in the 7th-century Armenian geography Ashkharhats‘oyts‘, while Suren Yeremian believed it encompassed only a part of Gugark. The bdeashkh of Gugark could serve either the king of Armenia or the king of Iberia. It was lost by Armenia in the chaotic period between 14 and 63 but was recovered after the Treaty of Rhandeia. It came under Iberian rule in the by 387 and survived for centuries longer than the other three vitaxates. The Vitaxate of Aruastan, the "Arabian March", corresponded to the principality of Ałdznik, whose prince was ex officio also the bdeashkh. The purpose of this vitaxate was to protect Armenia from invasion from Mesopotomia, particularly from the direction of Nisibis, the surrounding area of which was called Mygdonia in Greek and Aruastan in Armenian. The bdeashkh of Ałdznik was also known as "the great bdeashkh", which according to Hakob Anasyan and Nina Garsoïan, reflected his seniority among the four bdeashkhs. The Vitaxate of Nor Shirakan, the "Adiabenian" or "Median March", was intended to protect Armenia from invasion from the valley of the Great Zab River and eastern Adiabene. In Hewsen's view, this vitaxate was formed from territory ceded by Adiabene, which was probably granted Mygdonia to the west as compensation. All three southern vitaxates (Ałdznik, Korduk, and Nor Shirakan) were lost by Armenia in the 4th century—per Hewsen, in the period 363–387.

In his study of the countries of Sophene, Adiabene, and Gordyene, historian Michał Marciak criticizes the reconstruction of the vitaxates of Armenia by Hewsen and other scholars as "highly theoretical" and speculative. Marciak writes, "the construct of the four vitaxates of Armenia has relevance only for the understanding of the Armenian tradition and has no value for the political history of Northern Mesopotamia in the fourth century CE."

== In Georgia ==
The office of bidaxsh is attested in Georgia in several inscriptions dating to the AD 1st–3rd centuries found in a cemetery for the bidaxshes and their relatives in Armazi. One of these is a bilingual Aramaic and Greek tombstone inscription where the title is rendered in Aramaic as rb trbṣ ("maior domūs") and in Greek as epítropos; this latter title was used at the time to refer to Roman provincial governors. Another inscription on a bowl, probably from the 3rd century, lists a dynasty of three bidaxshes. In the view of the linguist and Iranologist Walter Bruno Henning, these bidaxshes were the same as the bidaxshes of the first Sasanian rulers. However, this view has been questioned by other scholars both on the basis of Henning's reading and the fact that the Sasanian bidaxshes go back to the time of Ardashir I, whose rule did not extend over Georgia. The Iranologist Werner Sundermann writes, "What remains clear is that in the second century the bidaxšes functioned as a kind of major domus at the Georgian court and that there could be several bidaxšes at the same time, e.g., a 'small bidaxš.' "

== In Sasanian Iran ==
In the Sasanian king Shapur I's inscription at the Ka'ba-ye Zartosht, several dignitaries are mentioned with the title of bidaxsh; two of these are mentioned after members of the royal house and before the members of other noble houses, while another bidaxsh and his son are mentioned later in the text. A bidaxsh appears in a similar position in the Paikuli inscription left by the Sasanian king Narseh. According to Sundermann, the title of bidaxsh in the early Sasanian Empire was probably given to "a kind of vice-king or grand vizier of the realm", possibly a member of the royal dynasty. This may have also been the nature of the office in the preceding Arsacid period. In the 4th century, the title was used to refer to the military governor of a province, since the Roman author Ammianus Marcellinus equates vitaxae with magistri equitum 'masters of the cavalry.'

== See also ==
- Marzban
- Satrap
