= Military rank =

Element of hierarchy in armed forces

Military ranks are a system of hierarchical relationships within armed forces, police, intelligence agencies and other institutions organized along military lines. Responsibility for personnel, equipment and missions grows with each advancement. The military rank system defines dominance, authority and responsibility within a military hierarchy. It incorporates the principles of exercising power and authority into the military chain of command—the succession of commanders superior to subordinates through which command is exercised. The military chain of command is an important component for organized collective action.

Uniforms denote the bearer's rank by particular insignia affixed to the uniforms of a number of countries. Ranking systems have been known for most of military history to be advantageous for military operations, in particular with regard to logistics, command, and coordination. As time went on and military operations became larger and more complex, more ranks were created and the systems of ranking became more complex.

Rank is not only used to designate leadership, but to establish pay-grade as well. As rank increases, pay-grade follows, but so does the amount of responsibility.

In modern armed forces, the use of ranks is almost universal. Communist states have, on several occasions, abolished the use of ranks (e.g., the Soviet Red Army 1918–1935, the Chinese People's Liberation Army 1965–1988, and the Albanian People's Army 1966–1991), but they have had to re-establish them after encountering operational difficulties in command and control.

== Ancient ==
=== Greek ===
From 501 BC, the Athenians annually elected ten individuals to the rank of strategos, one for each of the ten "tribes" that had been created with the founding of the democracy. Strategos means "army leader" and is usually translated as "general". Originally these generals worked together with the old polemarchos ("warlord") but over time the latter figure was absorbed into the generalship: each of the ten generals would rotate as polemarch for one day, and during this day his vote would serve as tie-breaker if necessary.

As an elected official a Strategos is by definition not a military rank. Strategos is a Political Rank in a Hierarchical Position above the military, politically similar in nature to a modern-day Sheriff or Police Commissioner. This is completely different from a modern day Commissioned Military General who never stands for election at any point in their careers. Historically it is unclear whether there was any badge of office granted to a Strategos though given current customs one should suspect that there was such a badge of office.

The confusion regarding the "Ranking" of Strategos surely stems from the modern custom of granting Police Commissioners and Sheriff's, both Political Ranks, a badge-of-office that happens to be in the shape of what is commonly understood to be a very high rank within the traditional military hierarchy. This "rank-shaped" badge-of-office a formal representation of Public Civilian (political) authority over military matters.

The ten generals were equal to one another; there was no hierarchy among them. However, a basic form of democracy was in effect: for example, at the Battle of Marathon in 490 BC, the generals determined the battle plan by majority vote. Particular assignments might have been given to individual generals; inevitably there was a regular division of responsibilities.

The rank that was subordinate to a top general was a taxiarchos or taxiarhos, something akin to the modern brigadier. In Sparta, however, the title was "polemarchos". Below this was the syntagmatarchis, which can be translated as "leader of a regiment" (syntagma) and was therefore like a modern colonel. Below him was the tagmatarches, a commanding officer of a tagma (near to the modern battalion). The rank was roughly equivalent to the legatus of a Roman legion. Next was the lokhagos, an officer who led an infantry unit called a lokhos that consisted of roughly a hundred men, much the same as in a modern company led by a captain.

A Greek cavalry (hippikon) regiment was called a hipparchia and was commanded by an epihipparch. The unit was split into two and led by two hipparchos or hipparch, but Spartan cavalry was led by a hipparmostes. A hippotoxotès was a mounted archer. A Greek cavalry company was led by a tetrarchès or tetrarch.

The rank and file of the military in most of the Greek city states was composed of ordinary citizens. Heavily armed foot soldiers were called hoplitès or hoplites and a hoplomachos was a drill or weapons instructor.

Once Athens became a naval power, the top generals of the land armies had authority over the naval fleets as well. Under them, each warship was commanded by a trièrarchos or trierarch, a word which originally meant "trireme officer" but persisted when other types of vessels came into use. Moreover, as in modern navies, the different tasks associated with running a ship were delegated to different subordinates. Specifically, the kybernètès was the helmsman, the keleustēs managed the rowing speed, and the trièraulès was the flute player who maintained the strike rate for the oarsmen. Following further specialization, the naval strategos was replaced by a nauarchos, a sea officer equating to an admiral.

With the rise of Macedonia under Philip II of Macedon and Alexander the Great, the Greek military became professional, tactics became more sophisticated and additional levels of ranking developed. Foot soldiers were organized into heavy infantry phalanxes called phalangites. These were among the first troops ever to be drilled, and they fought packed in a close rectangular formation, typically eight men deep, with a leader at the head of each column (or file) and a secondary leader in the middle so that the back rows could move off to the sides if more frontage was needed.

A tetrarchia was a unit of four files and a tetrarchès or tetrarch was a commander of four files; a dilochia was a double file and a dilochitès was a double-file leader; a lochos was a single file and a lochagos was a file leader; a dimoiria was a half file and a dimoirites was a half-file leader. Another name for the half file was a hèmilochion with a hèmilochitès being a half-file leader.

Different types of units, however, were divided differently and therefore their leaders had different titles. For example, under a numbering system by tens, a dekas or dekania was a unit of ten led by a dekarchos, a hekatontarchia was a unit of one hundred led by a hekatontarchos and a khiliostys or khiliarchia was a unit of a thousand led by a khiliarchos.

The cavalry, for which Alexander became most famous (in a military sense), grew more varied. There were heavy cavalry and wing cavalry (ilè) units, the latter commanded by an ilarchos.

=== Roman ===
The use of formalized ranks came into widespread use with the Roman legions after the reforms by Marius. Comparisons to modern ranks, however, can only be loose because the Roman army's command structure was very different from the organizational structure of its modern counterparts, which arose from the early modern, Thirty Years' War mercenary companies, rather than from the writings of fourth-century Roman writer Vegetius and Caesar's commentaries on his conquest of Gaul and the civil war.

Military command properly so-called was a political office in Rome. A commander needed to be equipped with imperium, a politico-religious concept. The king who possessed it (the rex sacrorum) was strictly forbidden to have it to avoid a return to the monarchy. In the republic, commanding was confined to consuls or (seldom) to praetors, or in cases of necessity a dictator. Proconsuls, after the establishment of the office, were used. In imperial times, each legion was commanded by the emperor, who was technically either consul or proconsul.

The commander could appoint a deputy, a so-called legate (legatus). The association of "legatus" with "legion" is folk etymology, as the meaning of legatus is "proxy" or "envoy". Legates were typically drawn from the Roman Senate for three-year terms. The political nature of high military command was even reflected here, in that legions were always subordinate to the governor, and only the second and further legions stationed in a province had their own legatus legionis. The real commanders and the legates together were, in modern terms, the general officers.

Immediately beneath the commander (or his legate) were six military tribunes (tribuni militum), five of whom were young men of equestrian rank and one of whom was a nobleman who was headed for the senate. The latter is called laticlavian tribune (tribunus laticlavius) and was second in command. If in modern divisions the deputy commander is a brigadier general, the laticlavian tribune can perhaps be translated with this rank, though he commanded no formation of his own. The other tribunes are called tribuni angusticlavii and are equivalent to staff officers in both senses of the term: of ranks major, lieutenant colonel, colonel, and with administrative duties. They did not command a formation of their own. The term military tribune is even sometimes translated into English as "colonel"—most notably by the late classicist Robert Graves in his Claudius novels and his translation of Suetonius' Twelve Caesars—to avoid confusion with the political "tribunes of the people"; in addition, they must not either be confused with the "military tribunes with consular authority", who in early republican times could replace the consuls.

The third highest officer of a legion, above the angusticlavian tribunes, was the praefectus castrorum. He, too, would have a colonel's rank in modern armies, yet he differed much from the tribunes in that his office was not part of the rather administrative cursus, but normally filled by former centurions. (Modern armies have a similar distinction on a lower scale—i.e., between commissioned and non-commissioned officers.)

The fighting men in the legion were formed into "ranks", rows of men who fought as a unit. Under Marius's new system, legions were divided into ten cohorts (cohortes) (roughly equivalent to battalions and immediately subject to the legion), each consisting of three manipula, each of them of two centuries (a rather small company in modern terms), each consisting of between 60 and 160 men. Each century was led by a centurion (centurio, traditionally translated as captain), who was assisted by a number of junior officers, such as an optio. Centuries were further broken into ten contubernia of eight soldiers each. The manipula were commanded by one of their two centurions, the cohorts by one of their three manipulum's centurions; the most senior cohort-commanding centurions was called primus pilus. The ranks of centurions in the individual cohorts were, in descending order, pilus prior, pilus posterior, princeps prior, princeps posterior, hastatus prior, and hastatus posterior. Individual soldiers were referred to as soldiers (milites) or legionaries (legionarii).

=== Mongol ===
See Mongol military tactics and organization.

=== Turk ===
There were no ranks in the modern sense of a hierarchy of titles, although the army was organized into a hierarchical command. The organization of the army was based on the decimal system, employed by Modun Chanyu. The army was built upon a squad of ten (aravt) led by an appointed chief. Ten of these would then compose a company of a hundred (zuut), also led by an appointed chief. The next unit was a regiment of a thousand (myangat) led by an appointed noyan. The largest organic unit was a ten thousand man unit (tumen) also led by an appointed noyan.

=== Persian ===
The army of ancient Persia consisted of manageable military groupings under the individual commands. Starting at the bottom, a unit of 10 was called a dathabam and was led by a dathapatis. A unit of 100 men was a satabam led by a satapatis. A unit of 1,000 was a hazarabam and was commanded by a hazarapatis. A unit of 10,000 was a baivarabam and was commanded by a baivarapatis. The Greeks called such masses of troops a myrias or myriad. Among mounted troops, an asabam was a cavalry unit led by an asapatis.

Historians have discovered the existence of the following ranks in Parthian and Sassanian armies:

- Commander-in-chief: Eran spahbod (to be replaced with four spahbods, one for each frontier of the empire during the reign of Khosrau I)
- Commander of the cavalry: Aspwargan salar (Parthian) or aswaran salar (Sassanian)
- Commander of the archers: Tirbodh
- Commander of the infantry: paygan salar
- Castellan: Argbadh or argbod
- Commander of a frontier march: Marzpawn (Parthian) or marzban (Sassanian)
- Marzban of Central Asian marches was called kanarang

== Post-classical ==
Post-classical militaries did not have a unified rank structure; while the feudal lords were in some ways equivalent to modern officers, they did not have a strict hierarchy—a king was conceived of as first among equals, not a monarch as later or ancient societies understood the concept, and all nobles were theoretically equals (hence "peers"). A nobleman was obligated to bring a set number of troops when asked by his liege-lord, a king or merely a higher-ranked noble who had obtained his service by the gift of land. The troops' lord retained at least nominal control over them—many post-classical military planning sessions involved negotiating each lord's role in the coming battle—and each lord was allowed to leave after a predetermined amount of time had passed.

=== High command in post-classical armies ===
The command structure of armies was generally loose and varied considerably. Typically, the king and high-ranking lords would call out for all lords to gather their troops for a campaign. They would appoint a renowned noble to organize the assembling forces, the marshal. The term field marshal came from the marshal then leading the army on the march, and being in charge of organizing camps and logistics. Tactics for an upcoming battle were often decided by councils of war among the nobles leading the largest forces. Outside of campaigns, the high constable had authority over the local constables, and commanders of the garrisons of major castles. The high constable might have authority in the army due to his role of head of the regular cavalry.

=== Origins of modern ranks ===
As the European and Asian Middle Ages came to an end, the rank structure of post-classical armies became more formalized. The top officers were known as commissioned officers because their rank came from a royal commission. Army commissions were usually reserved for those of high stature—the aristocracy of mainland Europe and the aristocracy and gentry of Great Britain.

The basic unit of the post-classical army was the company, a band of soldiers assigned (or raised) by a vassal lord on behalf of his lord (in later times the king himself). The vassal lord in command of the company was a commissioned officer with the rank of captain. Captain was derived from the Late Latin word capitaneus (meaning "head man" or chief).

The commissioned officer assisting the captain with command of the company was the lieutenant. Lieutenant was derived from the French language; the lieu meaning "place" as in a position; and tenant meaning "holding" as in "holding a position"; thus a "lieutenant" is somebody who holds a position in the absence of their superior. When he was not assisting the captain, the lieutenant commanded a unit called a platoon, particularly a more specialized platoon. The word is derived from the 17th-century French peloton, meaning a small ball or small detachment of men, which came from pelote, a ball.

The commissioned officer carrying the (infantry) company's flag was the ensign. The word ensign was derived from the Latin word insignia. In cavalry companies the equivalent rank was cornet. In English usage, these ranks were merged into the single rank of second lieutenant in the 19th century.

Not all officers received a commission from the king. Certain specialists were granted a warrant, certifying their expertise as craftsmen. These warrant officers assisted the commissioned officers but ranked above the non-commissioned officers (NCOs). They received their authority from superior officers rather than the king. The first NCOs were the armed servants (men-at-arms) of the aristocracy, assigned to command, organize and train the militia units raised for battle. After years of commanding a squad, an NCO could be promoted to sergeant, the highest NCO rank. While a sergeant might have commanded a squad upon promotion, he usually became a staff officer. While commissioned staff officers assisted their commander with personnel, intelligence, operations and logistics, the sergeant was a jack of all trades, concerning himself with all aspects of administration to maintain the enlisted men serving under his commander. Over time, sergeants were differentiated into many ranks as various levels of sergeants were used by the commanders of various levels of units.

A corporal commanded a squad. Squad derived from the Italian word for a "square" or "block" of soldiers. In fact, corporal was derived from the Italian caporal de squadra (head of the squad). Corporals were assisted by lancepesades. Lancepesades were veteran soldiers; lancepesade was derived from the Italian lancia spezzata meaning broken spear—the broken spear being a metaphor for combat experience, where such an occurrence was likely. The first lancepesades were simply experienced privates; who either assisted their corporal or performed the duties of a corporal themselves. It was this second function that made armies increasingly regard their lancepesades as a grade of corporal rather than a grade of private. As a result, the rank of lance corporal was derived from combining lancepesade and corporal.

As the post-classical came to an end, kings increasingly relied on professional soldiers to fill the bottom ranks of their armies instead of militiamen. Each of these professionals began their careers as a private. The private was a man who signed a private contract with the company commander, offering his services in return for pay. The money was raised through taxation; those yeomen (smallholding peasants) who did not fulfill their annual 40-day militia service paid a tax that funded professional soldiers recruited from the yeomanry. This money was handed to the company commanders from the royal treasury, with the company commanders using the money to recruit the troops.

=== Origins of higher ranks ===
As armies grew larger, composed of multiple companies, one captain was granted general (overall) authority over the field armies by the king. (National armies were the armies of the kings. Field armies were armies raised by the king to enter the battle field in preparation for major battles.) In French history, lieutenant du roi was a title borne by the officer sent with military powers to represent the king in certain provinces. A lieutenant du roi was sometimes known as a lieutenant général to distinguish him from lieutenants subordinate to mere captains. The sergeant acting as staff officer to the lieutenant general was known as the sergeant major general. This was eventually shortened to major general, while captain general began to be addressed, depending on the military branch, as general of the infantry, general of the cavalry or general of the artillery, and these ones, over time, were shortened to simply general. This is the reason a major outranks a lieutenant, but a lieutenant general outranks a major general.

In modern times recruits attending basic training, also referred to as boot camp by some branches, are instructed in the hierarchical structure of military rank. Many new enlisted civilians find it difficult to understand the structure of general staff ranks as stated before, it becomes somewhat complicated to understand when applying basic rationale.

As armies grew bigger, heraldry and unit identification remained primarily a matter of the regiment. Brigades headed by brigadier generals were the units invented as a tactical unit by the Swedish king Gustavus II Adolphus. It was introduced to overcome the normal army structure, consisting of regiments. The so-called "brigada" was a mixed unit, comprising infantry, cavalry and normally artillery, designated for a special task. The size of such brigada was a reinforced company up to two regiments. The brigada was a 17th-century form of the modern "task force". In some armies "brigadier general" has been shortened to "brigadier".

Around the end of the 16th century, companies were grouped into regiments. The officers commissioned to lead these regiments were called "colonels" (column officers). They were first appointed in Spain by King Ferdinand II of Aragon where they were also known as "coronellos" (crown officers) since they were appointed by the Crown. Thus the English pronunciation of the word colonel.

The first colonels were captains granted command of their regiments by commission of the king. The lieutenants of the colonel were the lieutenant colonels. In the 17th century, the sergeant of the colonel was the sergeant major. These were field officers, third in command of their regiments (after their colonels and lieutenant colonels), with a role similar to the older, army-level sergeants major (although on a smaller scale). The older position became known as sergeant major general to distinguish it. Over time, the sergeant was dropped from both titles since both ranks were used for commissioned officers. This gave rise to the modern ranks of major and major general.

The full title of sergeant major fell out of use until the latter part of the 18th century, when it began to be applied to the senior non-commissioned officer of an infantry battalion or cavalry regiment.

Regiments were later split into battalions with a lieutenant colonel as a commanding officer and a major as an executive officer.

== Modern ==
Modern military services recognize three broad categories of personnel. These are codified in the Geneva Conventions, which distinguish officers, non-commissioned officers, and enlisted men.

Apart from conscripted personnel one can distinguish:

=== Commissioned officers ===
Officers are distinguished from other military members (or an officer in training) by holding a commission; they are trained or training as leaders and hold command positions.

Officers are further generally separated into four levels:

- General, flag, or air officers
- Field or senior officers
- Company grade or junior officers
- Subordinate officer (naval cadet or officer cadet in the Canadian forces, for example)

==== General, flag, and air officers ====
Officers who typically command units or formations that are expected to operate independently for extended periods of time (i.e., brigades and larger, or flotillas or squadrons of ships), are referred to variously as general officers (in armies, marines, and some air forces), flag officers (in navies and coast guards), or air officers (in some Commonwealth air forces).

General-officer ranks typically include (from the most senior) general, lieutenant general, major general, and brigadier general, although there are many variations like division general or (air-, ground-) force general.

Flag-officer ranks, named after the traditional practice of showing the presence of such an officer with a flag on a ship and often land, typically include (from the most senior) admiral, vice admiral and rear admiral. In some navies, such as Canada's, the rank of commodore is a flag rank.

In the United Kingdom and most other Commonwealth air forces, air-officer ranks usually include air chief marshal, air marshal, air vice-marshal and air commodore. For some air forces, however, such as those of Canada, United States and many other air forces, general officer rank titles are used. In the case of the United States Air Force, that service was once part of the U.S. Army and evolved as a separate service in 1947, carrying over its extant officer rank structure. Brazil and Argentina use a system of general officer ranks based on the term brigadier.

In some forces, there may be one or more superior ranks to the common examples, above, that are given distinguishing titles, such as field marshal (most armies of the world, notably excluding the United States) or general of the army (mainly the United States because "marshal" is used as a peace officer's designation), fleet admiral (U.S. Navy), Marshal of the Royal Air Force, or other national air force. These ranks have often been discontinued, such as in Germany and Canada, or limited to wartime or honorific promotion, such as in the United Kingdom and the United States.

In various countries, particularly the United States, these may be referred to as "star ranks" for the number of stars worn on some rank insignia: typically one-star for brigadier general or equivalent with the addition of a star for each subsequent rank. In the United States, five stars has been the highest rank regularly attainable (excluding the marines and coast guard, which have traditionally served as branches of the navy in times of war and thus under the command of a fleet admiral). There also exists the specialty ranks of General of the Armies of the United States and Admiral of the Navy which at their inception were considered senior four star officers but came to be considered six-star rank after the creation of five star officers. To date only one officer has held a six star rank in his lifetime, John J. Pershing. George Washington was posthumously promoted to the post in 1976. Additionally, Admiral George Dewey was promoted to admiral of the navy but died well before statute made it senior to an admiral of the fleet upon the latter's inception.

Some titles are not genuine ranks, but either functions assumed by generals or honorific titles. For instance, in the French Army général de corps d'armée is a function assumed by some généraux de division, and maréchal de France, which is a distinction denoting the most superior military office, but one that has often neutered the practical command powers of those on whom it is conferred. In the United States Navy, a commodore currently is a senior captain commanding a squadron, air group, or air wing that is too small for a rear admiral to command, although that name has historically been used as a rank. The title (not rank) of commodore can also indicate an officer who is senior to a ship's captain (since only the ship's commanding officer is addressed as captain while under way). Marine captains are sometimes referred to as major to distinguish themselves while shipboard, although this reference is not employed in the U.S. Navy or U.S. Marine Corps.

==== Field or senior officers ====
Field officers, also called "field-grade officers" or "senior officers", are officers who typically command units that can be expected to operate independently for short periods of time (i.e., infantry battalions, cavalry or artillery regiments, warships, air squadrons). Field officers also commonly fill staff positions of superior commands.

The term field(-grade) officer is primarily used by armies and marines; air forces, navies and coast guards generally prefer the term "senior officer." The two terms are not necessarily synonymous because the former is frequently used to describe any officer who holds a command position from a platoon to a theater.

Typical army and marine field officer ranks include colonel, lieutenant colonel, major and, in the British army, captains holding an adjutant's or operations officer appointment. In many Commonwealth countries the field rank of brigadier is used, although it fills the position held by brigadier general in other countries. In the United States Army, warrant officers who hold the rank of CW3–CW4 are field grade officers; CW5s are senior field grade officers.

Naval and coast guard senior officer ranks include captain and commander. In some countries, the more senior rank of commodore is also included. In others lieutenant commanders, as equivalents to army and marine majors, are considered senior officers.

Commonwealth air force senior officer ranks include group captain, wing commander, and squadron leader, where such ranks are still used.

==== Company grade or junior officers ====
The ranks of junior officers are the three or four lowest ranks of officers. Units under their command are generally not expected to operate independently for any significant length of time. Company grade officers also fill staff roles in some units. In some militaries, however, a captain may act as the permanent commanding officer of an independent company-sized army unit, for example a signal or field engineer squadron, or a field artillery battery.

Typical army company officer ranks include captain and various grades of lieutenant. Typical naval and coast guard junior officer ranks include grades of lieutenant commander, lieutenant, lieutenant junior grade, sub-lieutenant and ensign. Commonwealth (excluding Canada) air force junior officer ranks usually include flight lieutenant, flying officer, and pilot officer.

==== Subordinate or student officer ====
Officers in training in the Canadian Armed Forces are either naval cadet for naval training or officer cadet for army or air force training.

In the US and several other western forces, officers in training are referred to as student officers, and carry the rank of cadet (army and air force) or midshipman (navy, and in some countries, marines). These officers may be serving at a military academy, or, as common in the United States, as members of a military training unit attached to a civilian college or university, such as an ROTC unit. This is due to a requirement that commissioned officers have at least a four-year collegiate undergraduate degree.

The British Army refers to its trainee officers as officer cadets, who rank as private soldiers at the start of their training, with no authority over other ranks (except when appointed to carry out a role as part of training). Officer cadets are addressed to as "Mister" or "Miss" until the completion of the early stages of their training at the Royal Military Academy Sandhurst (at which point cadets "pass out" and formally gain their commissions), thereafter other ranks (non-officers) will address them as "Sir" or "Ma'am".

While cadet has always been a rank of limited authority and prestige (cadets and US Navy midshipmen have no authority over commissioned personnel, warrants, or officers, only subordinate cadets), midshipman has historically been a rank with limited leadership responsibility, particularly in the Royal Navy (where cadets are commissioned at the start of their training, unlike their army counterparts). This tradition was continued by the US Navy after its original adoption of the rank, but now US Navy midshipmen are limited in the same manner as cadets in the other US services. Additionally, US Marine officers in training are also midshipmen, trained and educated alongside their naval counterparts, and wear distinctive insignia to indicate their branch of service.

US Coast Guard Academy students are referred to as "cadets", while those attending the military branch's officer candidate school are "officer candidates".

In the US an alternative to spending four years as a cadet or midshipmen is for college graduates with a four-year degree to attend officer candidate school, an intensive twelve-week training course designed to convert college graduates into military officers. Each service has at least one, and usually several, officer candidate school facilities. Students at these programs are called officer candidates.

=== Warrant officers ===
Warrant officers (as receiving authority by virtue of a warrant) are a hybrid rank treated slightly differently in each country or service. Warrant officers may either be effectively senior non-commissioned officers or an entirely separate grade between commissioned and non-commissioned officers, usually held by specialist personnel.

In the United States, warrant officers are appointed by warrant then commissioned by the President of the United States at the rank of chief warrant officer. Warrant officers range from WO1–CW5. A warrant officer is not a chief warrant officer until they reach W2. CW3–CW4 are field grade officers. Warrant officers in the rank or grade of CW5 are senior field grade officers.

=== Enlisted personnel ===
Enlisted personnel are personnel below commissioned rank and make up the vast majority of military personnel. They are known by different names in different countries, such as other ranks (ORs) in the United Kingdom and some Commonwealth countries, and non-commissioned members (NCMs) in Canada.

==== Non-commissioned officers ====
Non-commissioned officers (NCOs) are enlisted personnel, under the command of an officer, granted delegated authority to supervise other military members or assigned significant administrative responsibilities. They are responsible for the care and direct control of junior military members, often functioning in the smaller field units as executive officers.

Even the most senior NCO officially ranks beneath the most junior commissioned officer or warrant officer. However, most senior NCOs have more experience, possibly including combat, than junior officers. In many armies, because junior officers have a great amount of responsibility and authority but little operational experience, they are paired with senior NCO advisers. In some organizations, senior NCOs may have formal responsibility and informal respect beyond that of junior officers, but less than that of warrant officers. Many warrant officers come from the ranks of mid-career NCOs. In some countries warrant ranks replace senior enlisted ranks.

NCO ranks typically include a varying number of grades of sergeant and corporal (air force, army and marines), or chief petty officer and petty officer (navy and coast guard). In many navies the term 'rating' is used to designate specialty, while rank denotes pay grade.

In some countries warrant officers come under the non-commissioned officer branch (senior non-commissioned officiers).

==== Other enlisted ====
Personnel with no command authority usually bear titles such as private, airman or aircraftman, or seaman (starting with seaman recruit in the United States Navy and Coast Guard). In the United States Marine Corps individuals of all ranks regardless of command status may be referred to as "marine". In the United States Air Force individuals of all ranks regardless of command status may be referred to as "airman". Shortly after the Sailor's Creed was formally instituted, Secretary of the Navy John Dalton directed that the word sailor should be capitalized when referring to any uniformed member of the Navy. In some countries and services, personnel in different branches have different titles. These may have a variety of grades, such as private first class, but these usually only reflect variations in pay, not increased authority. These may or may not technically be ranks, depending on the country or service. Each rank gives the individual an indication of how long and how well they have served in combat and training.

== Appointment ==
Appointment is the instrument by virtue of which the person exercises their authority. Officers are appointed by a royal commission in most monarchies or a presidential commission in many other countries. In the Commonwealth, warrant officers hold a royal or presidential warrant. In the United States, officers are appointed by the president, with the advice and consent of the United States Senate. Most officers are approved en bloc by voice vote, but flag officers are usually required to appear before the Armed Services Committee and answer questions to the satisfaction of its members, prior to a vote on their commission.

NCOs are appointed by an instrument of appointment, a written document, often a certificate, usually from the service head. Entry into service is often referred to as enlistment throughout the English-speaking world, even in countries where soldiers do not technically enlist.

Sometimes personnel serve in an appointment which is higher than their actual rank. For instance, commodore used to be an appointment of captain in the Royal Navy and lance corporal used to be an appointment of private in the British Army.

== Types of rank ==
There are a number of different forms of rank; from highest to lowest degree, they are:

- Substantive or permanent: the fully paid and confirmed rank, with eligibility for the corresponding pension and benefits
  - Retired or retained: usually granted to those officers of the rank of lieutenant in the navy, or captain in the army, or above, and enlisted, who have reached the end of their service obligation and have not been dishonorably discharged or dismissed from the service. A retired rank is usually kept for life, if the officer concerned so wishes. In the Commonwealth of Nations, such an officer will also hold the style of Esquire, if they do not hold a higher title. In the United Kingdom, an officer of the regular service placed on the retired list or on the reserve will be shown in his/her substantive rank. An officer of the rank of lieutenant, captain, flight lieutenant or above leaving the reserve, or having no reserve liability is permitted to use their rank a courtesy title if they have completed 3 years service in the active list.
  - Veterans rank is different in each country. Members of the United States military maintain their highest rank after discharge or retirement. 10 U.S. Code § 772(e) states: A person not on active duty who served honorably in time of war in the Army, Navy, Air Force, or Marine Corps may bear the title and wear the uniform of the highest grade held by him during that war. After a war, regular serving members of the military holding war substantive or temporary rank often revert to their former, substantive rank and all others often end their service. However, the holder may be granted permission to permanently retain the rank they held when the conflict ended.
- Temporary: usually granted for a specific task or mission. The holder holds the rank while occupying that position. Despite the name, temporary rank may be held for a considerable period of time, perhaps even years. In wartime, temporary ranks are often common. In the United Kingdom, the rank of brigadier was long considered a temporary rank; while its holder was addressed as "brigadier," he would retain the substantive rank of colonel or lieutenant-colonel if not selected for promotion to general officer rank. Sub-classes of temporary rank (from highest to lowest) include:
  - War substantive: a temporarily confirmed rank only held for the duration of that war, though war substantive rank may be treated as substantive when considering the holder's eligibility for subsequent promotions and appointments.
  - Acting is where the holder assumes the pay and allowances appropriate to the acting rank, but a higher commanding officer may revert the holder to previous rank held. This is normally for a short period of time while the permanent occupant of the office is absent. During wartime, acting ranks are frequently held on an emergency basis, while peacetime holders of acting ranks are often those who must hold their permanent rank for a sufficient period before being confirmed in their new higher rank.
  - Brevet: an honorary promoted rank, without the full official authority or pay appropriate to the rank.
  - Local or theater: a form of temporary rank restricted to a specific location instead of a specific duty.
- Honorary: Often granted on retirement, or in certain special cases to honour a deserving civilian. Generally, honorary rank is treated as if it were substantive, but usually does not grant a corresponding wage or pension (increase). Certain members of the British royal family that serve in the military have honorary ranks in other services, but retain their original rank. Prince Harry, the Duke of Sussex, is a major in the British Army, but has an honorary rank of lieutenant commander in the Royal Navy, and squadron leader in the Royal Air Force.

== Size of command ==
=== Rank and unit size ===
To get a sense of the practical meaning of these ranks—and thus to be able to compare them across the different armed services, different nations, and the variations of titles and insignia—an understanding of the relative levels and sizes of each command is helpful. The ranking and command system used by U.S. Marine ground forces or U.S. Army infantry units can serve as a template for this purpose. Different countries will often use their own systems that do not match the presentation here.

Under this system, starting from the bottom and working up, a corporal leads a fireteam consisting of three other individuals. A sergeant leads a squad consisting of three fireteams. As a result, a full squad numbers 13 individuals. Squads usually have numbered designations (e.g., 1st Squad).

Generally, in most armies and marine units, a lieutenant or equivalent rank leads a platoon, which can consist of three or four squads. For example, in U.S. Marine infantry units, rifle platoons usually consist of three rifle squads of 13 men each, with a Navy corpsman, the platoon leader, and a platoon sergeant (i.e., a staff sergeant who serves as second-in-command). An infantry platoon can number from 42 to 55 individuals, depending on the service. Platoons are usually numbered (e.g., 1st Platoon) or named after their primary function (e.g., service platoon).

A captain or equivalent rank commands a company, usually consisting of four platoons (three line platoons and one heavy weapons platoon). His headquarters can include a first sergeant and as many as seven others. As such, a company can comprise from roughly 175 to 225 individuals. Equivalent units also commanded by captains are batteries (for field artillery units) and detachments. In English speaking countries, a company (or troop in the cavalry, and battery in the artillery) is usually designated by a letter (e.g., "A Company"). In non-English speaking countries, they are usually numbered. In most Commonwealth armies a company is commanded by a major, assisted by a captain.

A lieutenant colonel or equivalent rank commands a battalion or a squadron, often consisting of four companies, plus the various members of his headquarters. A battalion is around 500–1,500 men and usually consists of between two and six companies.

A colonel or equivalent commands a regiment or group, often consisting of two or more battalions (for an infantry unit) or five to six air groups (for a wing). Battalions and regiments are usually numbered, either as a separate battalion or as part of a regimental structure (e.g., 1-501st Infantry in the US Army).

The next level has been a brigade, commanded by a brigadier general, and containing two or more regiments or three to eight battalions. In the U.S. Army, a brigade is roughly equal to or a little larger than a regiment, consisting of three to seven battalions. Strength typically ranges from 1,500 to 3,500 personnel. In the U.S. Marines, brigades are only formed for certain missions. In size and nature they are larger and more varied collections of battalions than is common for a regiment, fitting them for their traditional role as the smallest formation able to operate independently on a battlefield without external logistical tactical support. Brigades are usually numbered (e.g., 2nd Brigade).

The level above regiment and brigade is the division, commanded by a major general and consisting of from 10,000 to 20,000 persons. The 1st Marine Division, for example, is made up of four marine regiments (of the type described above), one assault amphibian battalion, one reconnaissance battalion, two light armored reconnaissance battalions, one combat engineer battalion, one tank battalion, and one headquarters battalion—totalling more than 19,000 marines. (Within the headquarters battalion are one headquarters company, one service company, one military police company, one communications company, and one truck company.) An equivalent elsewhere within the same marine expeditionary force (MEF) might be an MEF logistics group (MLG), which is not a regimental-sized unit (as the word "group" implies), but rather a large support unit consisting of several battalions of support personnel. Divisions are normally numbered, but can be named after a function or personage.

The command sizes for any given rank will vary widely. Not all units are as troop intensive as infantry forces need to be. Tank and artillery crews, for example, involve far fewer personnel. Numbers also differ for non-combat units such as quartermasters, cooks, and hospital staff. Beyond this, in any real situation, not all units will be at full strength and there will be various attachments and detachments of assorted specialists woven throughout the system.

In the U.S. Army, the level above division is a corps. It is commanded by a lieutenant general. In many armies, a corps numbers around 60,000, usually divided into three divisions. Corps (and similar organizations) are normally designated with Roman numerals and their nationality when operating in a combined (international) force—e.g., V (US) Corps, VIII (ROK) Corps, II MEF, I Canadian Corps.

During World War II, due to the large scale of combat, multiple corps were combined into field armies commanded in theory by a general (four stars), but often by a lieutenant general (three stars), and comprising as many as 240,000 troops. Armies are numbered by spelled-out numerals or functional titles, using their nationality in "combined" forces (e.g., Eighth United States Army, Third ROK Army, British Army of the Rhine). These were in their turn formed into army groups, these being the largest field organization handled by a single commander in modern warfare. Army groups included between 400,000 and 1,500,000 troops. Army groups received Arabic numeral designations and national designations when combined- e.g. 21st Army Group.

== See also ==
- List of comparative military ranks
- Ranks of nobility and peerage
- UK and US military ranks compared
- Shoulder insignia
