= Military of the Sasanian Empire =

Armed forces of the Sassanid Persian Empire

Sassanian army
- Military leader: Eran-spahbed
- Political leader: Sasanian king of kings
- Dates active: 224–651
- Allegiance: Sasanian Empire
- Active regions: Asia Minor, Levant, North Africa, Caucasus, Khorasan, Transoxiana, Balkans, Mesopotamia, Arabian Peninsula
- Size: 300,000–310,000
- Part of: Sasanian Empire
- Wars: Wars of the Sasanian Empire

The Sasanian army was the primary military body of the Sasanian armed forces, serving alongside the Sasanian navy. The birth of the army dates back to the rise of Ardashir I (r. 224–241), the founder of the Sasanian Empire, to the throne. Ardashir aimed at the revival of the Persian Empire, and to further this aim, he reformed the military by forming a standing army which was under his personal command and whose officers were separate from satraps, local princes and nobility. He restored the Achaemenid military organizations, retained the Parthian cavalry model, and employed new types of armour and siege warfare techniques. This was the beginning for a military system which served him and his successors for over 400 years, during which the Sasanian Empire was, along with the Roman Empire and later the Eastern Roman Empire, one of the two superpowers of Late Antiquity in Western Eurasia. During the reign of Khosrow the Sasanian army underwent major reforms. The Sasanian army protected Eranshahr ("the realm of Iran") from the East against the incursions of central Asiatic nomads like the Hephthalites and Turks, while in the west it was engaged in a recurrent struggle against the Roman Empire.

== Army ==
In the character of their warfare, the Persians of the Sasanian period differed greatly from their forebears under the Achaemenid kings. The principal changes which time had brought about were an almost entire disuse of the war chariot, the advance of the elephant corps into a very prominent and important position, and the increased use and pre-eminence of cavalry on the Parthian model, including both heavy cataphracts and horse-archers. Four main arms of the service were recognized, each standing on a different level: the elephants, the horse, the archers, and the ordinary footmen.

=== Divisions ===
In Pahlavi language, smaller divisions of the spāh were referred to as vasht and larger divisions were designated as gond. The Arabic word jund (جند), meaning "army", is derived from the latter.

The Sassanid army was organized in accordance with the "decimal system", that is, its structural units were units that consistently counted tens, hundreds, thousands and tens of thousands of soldiers. It is known from Sasanian sources that a tens was called radag, a hundred - tahm, commanded by an officer with the rank of tahmdār. A unit of 500 warriors was called a wašt, commanded by an officer with the rank of wašt-sālār. Drafš was a large detachment (possibly numbering 1000 soldiers) under the command of an officer with the rank of drafš-sālār. Units of 5,000 warriors were called gund, and they were commanded by a commander in the rank of gund-sālār. An army of 10,000 warriors was called spāh and was commanded by a general with the rank of spāhbed. The head of the military estate of Sasanian Iran was called artēštārān-sālār.

=== Ranks ===
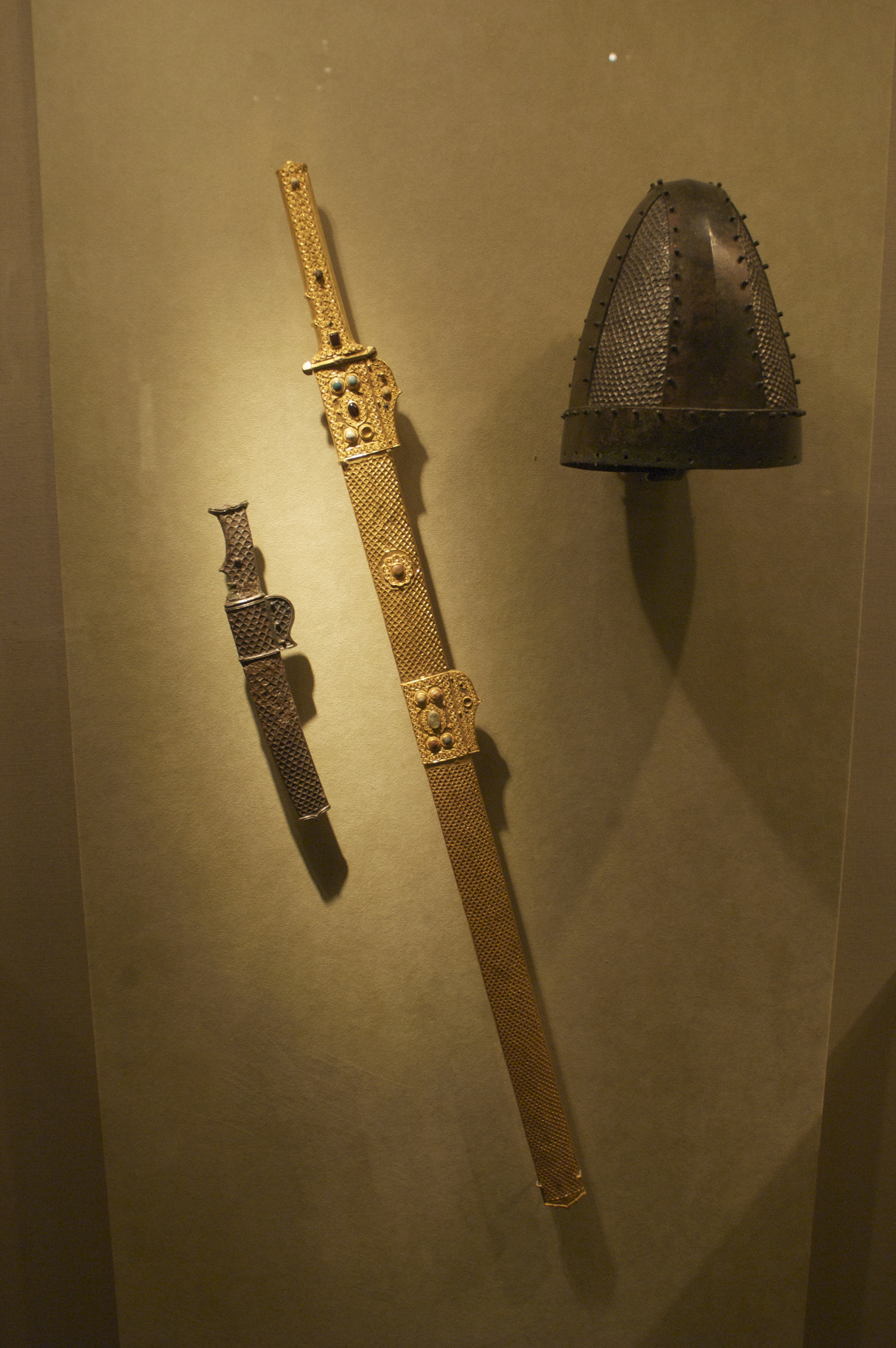
A Sasanian helmet, sword, and dagger.

Head of the military was the Shahanshah (the King of Kings). The empire's military command was split into four. Initially, the offices of the Great King of Armenia, King of Meshan, King of Gilan, and King of Sakastan fulfilled these roles. After the reforms of Khosrow I, there were four spahbeds (Army Commanders), each for a cardinal direction. Other attested military ranks throughout the Sasanian period are as follows: (the exact nature of some of these are not well-understood)

- Wuzurg-framadar, who could become the commander-in-chief and was entrusted to engage in diplomatic negotiations.
- Ērān-spāhbed, spāhbedān-spāhbed, artēštārān-sālār: all denote the regular commander-in-chief, apparently chosen from the House of Suren.
- Spāhbed: Field general.
- Aswārān-sardār, aswārān-sālār: literally "Commander of the Cavalry", but its duties are unknown.
- Aspbed, also means "Commander of the Cavalry"
- Andarzbad-i Aswaran, chief instructor of the cavalry
- Paygān-sālār: Commander of the Infantry
- Marzbān: Commander of the border guards; according to Procopius, it had been equivalent in rank to the East Roman strategos or magister militum.
  - Kanārang, especial title for the commander in the Abarshahr.
- Pushtigbān-sālār: Head of the royal guard.
- Padgōspān or pādhūspān: military commander of a district or province.
- shahrab, commander of a rural district.
- Erān anbāraghbad: Senior rank responsible for army supplies.
- Stor Bezashk: Senior vet who looked after the cavalry elite's mounts.
- Argbed, commander of a citadel or fort.
- Gund-sālār: Commander of a gond division.
- Hazāruft or hazārbed: Commander of a Thousand [man], probably the commander of the Royal Bodyguard
- Sarhang
- Framadar or Framandar, battlefield commander

The military appointments were mostly dominated by the noble houses of Suren, Mihran, and Spandiyadh.

=== Cavalry ===
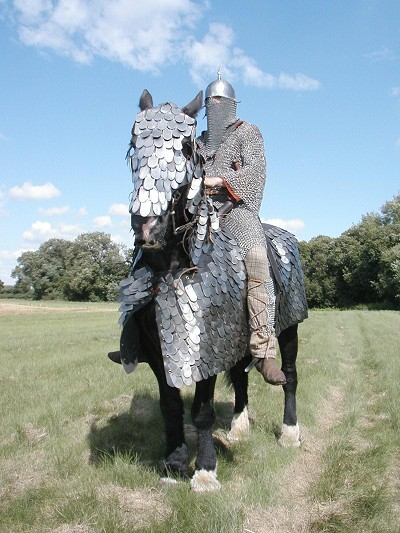
Reconstruction of a Sasanian-era cataphract.

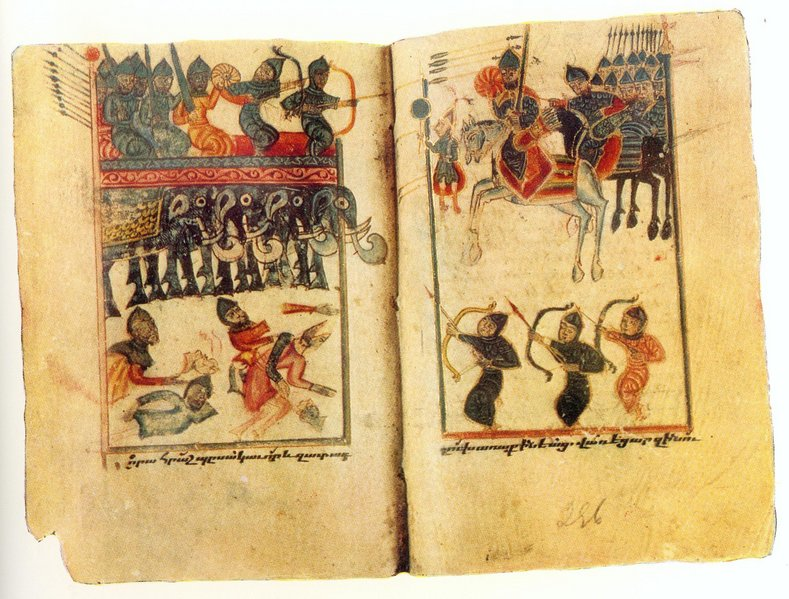
A medieval Armenian miniature representing the Sasanian War elephants in the Battle of Vartanantz.

The backbone of the Spâh in the Sasanian era was its heavy armoured cavalry, known since Classical antiquity in the west as Cataphracts. This was made up of noblemen who underwent extensive exercises in warfare and military maneuvers through military training, gaining discipline and becoming true soldiers. Within the Sasanian military, the cavalry was the most influential element, and Sasanian cavalry tactics were adopted by the Romans, Arabs, and Turks. Their weaponry, battle tactics, tamgas, medallions, court customs, and costumes greatly influenced their Romano-Byzantine neighbours. The Romans had long contended against opponents who fielded heavy cavalry, notably the Sarmatians and the Parthians, and the recurrent wars with the Sasanian were an important factor in the Roman turn to new military organizations and battlefield tactics that centered around the use of heavy cavalry in the 3rd and 4th centuries. The Romans called these newly formed units clibanarii; It is said that the word clibanarii is derived from Persian word grivpanvar or griva-pana-vara meaning neck-guard wearer. Another, more direct and often quoted, etymology is the Greek word ho klibanos, which refers to a covered pot in which bread was baked or a small oven; perhaps a joking reference to the one-piece mask helmets they wore. The Roman term appears for the first time in the vita Alexandri Severi (56.5) in the Historia Augusta, a work from the very end of the 4th century AD.

Shapur II (r. 309–379) further reformed the army by adopting heavier and more effective cavalry. These mounted units were clad in thick iron plates which covered their entire body. This made them look very much like moving iron statues. Some were armed with a lance and some with a sword and/or mace. Depictions of aforementioned cavalry still survive, with one of the best preserved ones being a rock relief at Taq-e Bostan where Khosrau II is seen riding his favorite horse, Shabdiz.

The fighting equipment of the heavily armed Sasanian horsemen were:

- Clibanarii/Cataphract cavalry: helmet, hauberk (Pahlavi griwban), breastplate, mail, gauntlet (Pahlavi abdast), girdle, thigh-guards (Pahlavi ran-ban) sword, mace, bowcase with two bows and two bowstrings, quiver with 30 arrows, two extra bowstrings, and horse armour (zen-abzar).

The heavy cavalry was complemented by lighter cavalry, which were not made up of Sasanian, but were recruited from among their allies and supplemented by mercenary troops. Gelani (Guilani), Albani, Hephthalites, Kushans and the Khazars were the main suppliers of this light- to medium-armoured cavalry. They were an essential part of the Spâh because of their endurance and speed on the battlefield.

It is possible that the mainly light cavalry were intended for the battles with the central Asiatic tribes, while the more heavy cavalry were used in encounters with Rome.

In short, there were the following classes of mobile cavalry troops:

- Persian immortal guard (Zhayedan)
- Azadan nobility Aswaran: elite cavalry also described as the Persian knightly caste (see below)
- War elephants
- Light cavalry: primarily horse-archers
- Dehqan cavalry: Medium-armoured cavalry armed with lance and bow
- Cataphract /Clibanarii cavalry: Heavy shock cavalry armed with lance, bow, sword and mace or battle axe (also known as Asvārān)

Depictions from the Sasanian art show different forms of horse archery: frontal shot, Parthian shot, shooting with stirrups and shooting while riding the horse backwards.

=== War elephants ===
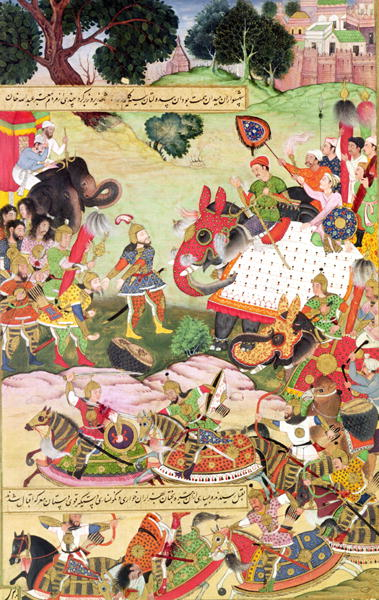
King Khosrow I on top of an elephant fighting the Mazdakite Revolt. Persian miniature

Both types of cavalry units were supported by war elephants and foot archers who showered the enemy with storms of arrows. The elephant corps held the first position. It was recruited from India, but was at no time very numerous. Great store was set by it; and in some of the earlier battles against the Arabs the victory was regarded as gained mainly by this arm of the service. It acted with best effect in an open and level district; but the value put upon it was such that, however rough, mountainous, and woody the country into which the Persian arms penetrated, the elephant always accompanied the march of the Persian troops, and care was taken to make roads by which it could travel. The elephant corps was under a special chief, known as the Zend−hapet, or "Commander of the Indians", either because the beasts came from that country, or because they were managed by natives of Hindustan. These giant beasts acted as walking towers on battlefields and caused panic and disorder in enemy ranks, creating openings in the lines that cavalry could take advantage of. Elephants played important roles in Sasanian victories at the battles of Arzamon and the Bridge.

=== Infantry ===
For infantry they find useless for their sort of fighting and it is not highly regarded by them. Nor, in fact, is it necessary to them, since the whole of the country that they inhabit is flat and bare. For a military force is naturally valued or slighted in proportion to its actual usefulness in war. Accordingly, ... it is granted no great consideration in their laws.

— Julian, Oration II

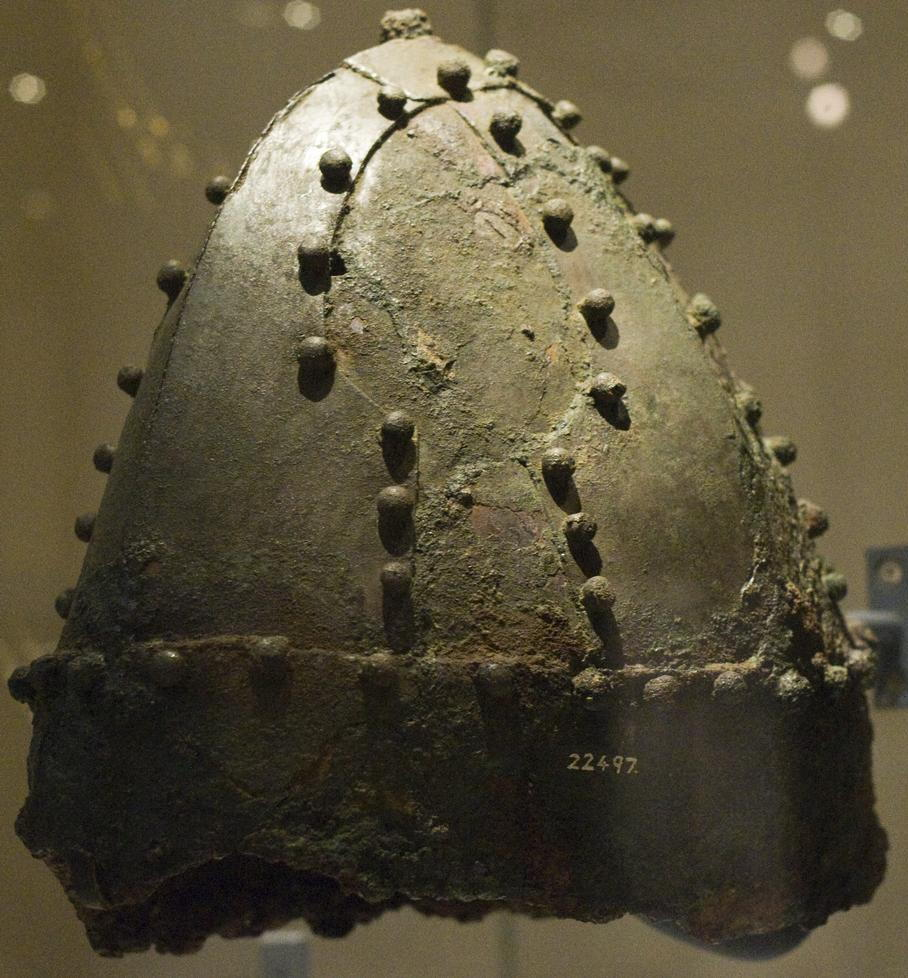
A Sasanian army helmet

There is growing conjecture that the historical view that Sasanian infantry were mostly lightly armed spearmen, who, like their Achaemenid ancestors, were usually levied troops of little fighting ability, could be an incomplete picture of the actual composition of these forces. The truth may be that Sasanian armies often fielded a complex mix of infantry troop types, some much more effective than others. However, the popular and long-held view of many modern historians has been greatly influenced by classical Roman views, which disparaged the infantry components of Sasanian armies. Procopius of Caesarea, for example, described them as "a crowd of pitiable peasants who come into battle for no other purpose than to dig through walls and to despoil the slain and in general to serve the soldiers [i.e. the cavalrymen]". In some battles, however, significant numbers of heavy infantry were deployed. These were well-paid, heavy mail armoured infantry (carrying swords and large rectangular shields). The Daylam provinces of the empire in particular were famous for providing high-quality foot soldiers.

The archers formed the elite of the Persian infantry. They were trained to deliver their arrows with extreme rapidity, and with an aim that was almost unerring. The huge wattled shields, adopted by the Achaemenid Persians from the Assyrians (called sparabara by the Achaemenids), still remained in use; and from behind a row of these, rested upon the ground and forming a sort of loop−holed wall, the Sasanian bowmen shot their weapons with great effect; nor was it until their store of arrows was exhausted that the Romans, ordinarily, felt themselves upon even terms with their enemy. Sometimes the archers, instead of thus fighting in line, were intermixed with the heavy horse, with which it was not difficult for them to keep pace. They galled the foe with their constant discharges from between the ranks of the horsemen, remaining themselves in comparative security, as the legions rarely ventured to charge the Persian armoured cavalry. If they were forced to retreat, they still shot backwards as they fled; and it was a proverbial saying with the Romans that they were then especially formidable. Infantry was divided into the following types:

- Daylami: Hard charging, southern Caspian region, mountaineer type, shielded medium infantry, armed with swords, maces, axe and javelins. Later they were hired in larger numbers and were heavily armoured and fought in closer formation, often intermixed with Sasanian elephants. 4000 were resettled to the Sassanid capital (Ctesiphon) as an elite infantry guard formation, known as 'Gond-i Shāhanshāh'. These 'Gond-i Shāhanshāh' defected to the Muslim Arabs as the Arab Conquest progressed.
- Paighan: Could have been Light conscript infantry that were recruited from the peasant population of the Sasanian Empire. They typically had large rectangular wickerwood or wood shields, boiled leather caps, and various weapons, typically spears or agricultural tools. However, Paighan could also be heavy, mail armoured swordsmen with large rectangular shields – as described by Ammianus p. 286, Engagement outside Ctesiphon AD 365 "they [i.e. cavalry] were supported by detachments of infantry who moved in compact formation carrying long, curved shields of wicker covered with raw hide.” “And day was now dawning, when mail-clad soldiers underspread the entire heaven, and the dense forces moved forward, not as before in disorder, but led by the slow notes of the trumpets and with no one running forward, protected too by pent-houses and holding before them wicker hurdles.“ Rerum Gestarum, 19.7.3 remarks on Sasanian troops; p. 265 – Excursus on Persian Society – Book 23 6.80 “Their infantry are armed like gladiators (Murmillo*) and obey orders like soldiers’ servants.”

Note: Murmillo were a type of specifically sword armed Roman gladiator, distinctive by their large rectangular shield and their sword arm harness (manicae). The remains of a Paighan infantryman – wearing a Sasanian spangenhelm and a mail shirt was excavated in the Tower 19 collapsed siege tunnel at Dura-Europos

- Neyze-daran: (Literally; Spear wielder) medium infantry armed with spears and large wicker shields possibly a sub-set of the Paighan
- Kamandaran: (Literally; "Bow bearer") archers
- Light ranged troops, such as Kurdish javelin-throwers
- Levy infantry: these troops represent the large numbers of agricultural estate workers, conscripted into the army on an unpaid basis, to dig field defenses and participate in siege works. They were armed with little more than their siege tools and a knife (occasionally protected on the battlefield by wicker siege pavices) and their true fighting value was often worse than negligible, running away at the first opportunity if 'threatened' by Roman or Byzantine regular infantry. It is these individuals that shaped the classical Roman authors' poor opinions of Sasanian infantry.
- Slingers are recorded in Sasanian army (notably in Battle of Singara (344)) and were probably recruited from the highlands of Media.

=== Siege warfare ===
The Sasanian had organized and efficient methods of siege warfare for conquering walled towns. First of all, they would mine the walls of besieged fortifications, as such a tunnel containing the body of a Sasanian soldier has been discovered underneath the walls of Roman Dura-Europos. Their siege machinery included crossbows, catapults and battering rams, but they also had excellent defensive tactics for their fortifications, such as methods for using and countering catapults, for countering mining, for throwing stones or pouring boiling liquid on the attackers or by hurling fire brands and blazing missiles. In the fourth century CE, the Persians still used moving armoured siege towers, in order to strafe the battlements with artillery and to allow their soldiers to climb over them . In the sixth century however, Procopius and Agathias no longer mention such towers, perhaps because at that time wheeled vehicles had almost entirely disappeared from the Middle East (Bulliet The Camel and the Wheel 1975). Instead of siege towers, Sasanian besiegers would now build a high siege mound, placing their artillery on its summit to target the defenders on the walls below. Like the Romans, the Sasanians also adopted the perrier or traction-trebuchet originating in the Far East, the forerunner of the later counterweight-trebuchet. They protected their sappers and soldiers with earthworks, shelters and mantlets.

- Catapult NP kamān-i charkh, kamān-i gāv ("ox-bow") Steingass 1047, the latter name suggesting that this second type of catapult was not drawn with a ratchet but with the help of a large and strong domestic animal like an ox. Such weapons are known to have been used in China.
- Battering ram
- Siege tower Ammianus Marcellinus 19.5.1, 19.7.2. Elephants were also used as "living mobile towers"
- Siege mound Procopius 1.7.17, 2.26.25–9
- Perrier Bernard Lewis (ed.) Islam from the Prophet of Muhammad to the Capture of Constantinople (NY 1987) I.215: In a rather symbolic discussion between Arabs and Persians, written by Al-Jahiz, the Arabs are denounced for not knowing the ratila (Arabic for a catapult, though ziyar seems to have been more usual Hugh Kennedy The Armies of the Caliphs 113; C. Cahen "Un traité d’armurerie composé pour Saladin" Bulletin d’etudes orientales 12 (1947–8) 133), the arrada and the manjaniq (Arabic for a small perrier operated by a few persons or even a single person (the pole-framed trebuchet) and a large perrier operated by up to 400 people respectively (the trestle-framed trebuchet)) or any other siege machinery, suggesting all these machines were already known to the pre-Islamic Persians. Pahlavi mangenik, derived from Greek manganikon, or koshkanjir NP Steingass 1033, 1062 kashkanjīr
- Earth works, shelters, mantlets Ammianus Marcellinus 19.5.1, 7.3

== Foreign and mercenary soldiers ==
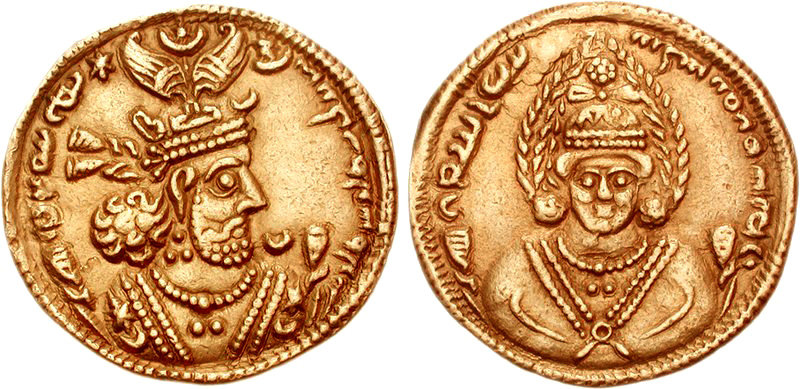
Coin of emperor Khosrow II, founder of the notorious Gond-i Shahanshah.

The Sasanian army, especially during the late Sasanian period, employed foreign mercenary troops from many different regions. The most frequently used types of mercenaries were Kurdish mercenaries from the northern boundary of the Zagros Mountains, who begin to appear in 6th century sources; tribal people from Gilan and Daylam; Caucasian Albanians (regarded as elite soldiers equal to Huns in the 4th-century); and Sistanis.

The Sasanians also often recruited foreign auxiliaries, such as Sabirs from the North Caucasus; or resettled on Sasanian territory, like the Turks who had been divided in 568/9; and the abundant Arab tribes in the south who were integrated into a "nexus of alliances managed by the Sasanians' Lakhmid client-kingdom from its capital at al-Hira" (James-Howard Johnston).

=== Gond-i Shahanshah ===
During the reign of Khosrow II (r. 590–628), probably sometime after 600, he resettled 4000 Daylamites in Ctesiphon and used them as an elite unit, where they became known as the Gond-i Shāhanshāh "the army of the Emperor".

After the Sasanian Empire suffered a major defeat in 636 during the Muslim conquest of Persia at the Battle of al-Qādisiyyah; the Gond-i Shahanshah defected to the Arabs, converted to Islam, and settled in Kufa, where they had their own quarter.

== Azadan nobility ==
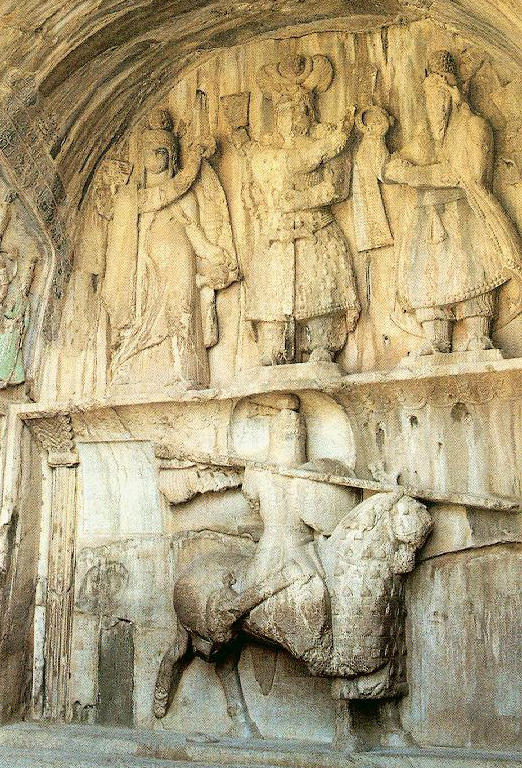
Depiction (bottom) of a Sasanian Clibanarii cavalry equipment in the monumental reliefs at Taq-e Bostan.

This class of nobility was first formed in Parthian times, and was carried over into the Sasanian state, where they were a force to be reckoned with. They accompanied the king in the wars and displayed great courage and discipline. They are clearly the forerunners and founders of the "Knights" of later history. The Aztan (Azadan, آزادان, "freemen") formed a numerous minor aristocracy of lower-ranking administrators, mostly living on their small estates and providing the cavalry backbone of the Sasanian army. Most prestigious among them were the armoured "Asvaran" اسوران, who normally decided the outcome of a battle.

Despite their downfall in the 7th century AD, the legacy of the Savaran endured in much of the Caucasus, India and the Muslim world. It was the elite cavalry of Sasanian Persia, who were the forerunners of the later Arabian Faris, the Caucasian horsemen, and the Indian Sowar (derived from Persian Savar).

The amount of money involved in maintaining a warrior of the Asavaran (Azatan) knightly caste required a small estate, and the Asavaran knightly caste received that from the throne, and in return, were the throne's most notable defenders in time of war.

== Buildings and structures ==
The Sasanians made use of fortifications, sometimes massive ones (such as Iraj Castle), as military and campaign bases. Sasanian defense lines of fortifications (such as those of Derbent and Gorgan) were later built on the borders opposite the territories of the opponents.

== Major battles of the Sasanian Empire ==
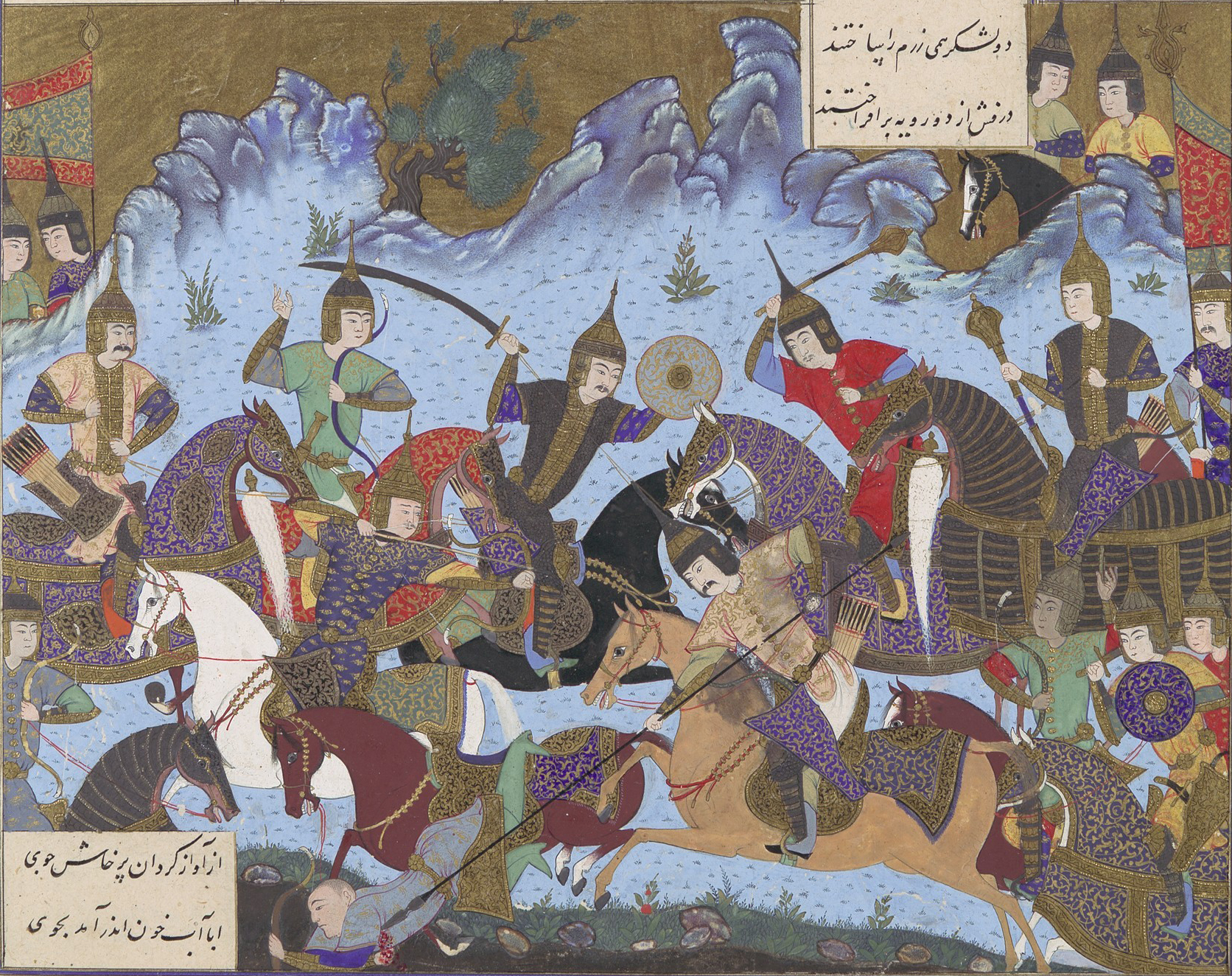
Shahnameh illustration of the Sasanian general Sukhra fighting the Hephthalites (484).

=== Early Sasanian period ===
- Battle of Edessa (260)
- Siege of Caesarea (260)
- Battle of Satala (298)
- Siege of Amida (359)
- Battle of Ctesiphon (363)
- Battle of Samarra (363)
- Battle of Avarayr (451)
- Battle of Herat (484)

=== Late Sasanian period ===
- Siege of Amida (502–503)
- Battle of Thannuris (528)
- Battle of Dara (530)
- Battle of Callinicum (531)
- Siege of Edessa (544)
- Siege of Petra (550–551)
- Battle of Bukhara (557)
- Siege of Dara (573)
- Battle of Melitene (576)
- Battle of Blarathon (591)
- Battle of Arzamon (605)
- Battle of Antioch (613)
- Battle of the Lycus (626)
- Battle of Nineveh (627)
- Battle of the Bridge (634)
- Battle of al-Qadisiyyah (636)
- Battle of Nahavand (642)
- Battle of Ray (651)

== Sources ==
- A.D.H. Bivar, ‘Cavalry Equipment and Tactics on the Euphrates Frontier’, Dumbarton Oaks Papers 26 (1972), pp. 271–291
- Michael B. Charles, ‘The Rise of the Sassanian Elephant Corps: Elephants and the Later Roman Empire’, Iranica Antiqua 42 (2007), pp. 301–346
- Kaveh Farrokh, Sassanian Elite Cavalry, AD 224–642 (Osprey Publishing 2005)
- James Howard-Johnston, ‘The Late Sasanian Army’. In: Bernheimer, T. – Silverstein, A. (eds.), Late Antiquity: Eastern perspectives, Exeter 2012, pp. 87–127.
- David Nicolle, Sassanian Armies : the Iranian empire early 3rd to mid-7th centuries AD (Montvert Publishing 1996). ISBN 1-874101-08-6
- Philip Rance, ‘Elephants in Warfare in Late Antiquity’, Acta Antiqua Academiae Scientiarum Hungaricae 43 (2003), pp. 355–384
- Peter Wilcox, Rome's Enemies 3: Parthians and Sassanid Persians (Osprey Publishing 2001). ISBN 0-85045-688-6
- Daryaee, Touraj (2009). Sasanian Persia: The Rise and Fall of an Empire. I.B.Tauris. pp. 1–240. ISBN 978-0857716668.
- Shapur Shahbazi, A. (1986). "Army i. Pre-Islamic Iran". Encyclopaedia Iranica, Vol. II, Fasc. 5. London et al. pp. 489–499.
- Kennedy, Hugh (2007). The Great Arab Conquests: How the Spread of Islam Changed the World We Live In. Philadelphia, Pennsylvania: Da Capo Press. ISBN 978-0-306-81740-3.
- Zakeri, Mohsen (1995). Sāsānid Soldiers in Early Muslim Society: The Origins of ʿAyyārān and Futuwwa. Wiesbaden: Otto Harrassowitz. ISBN 978-3-447-03652-8.
- Kaveh Farrokh, The Armies of Ancient Persia: The Sassanians (Pen and Sword). ISBN 978-1-84884-845-0
