= Timeline of the Sasanian Empire =

Persian dynasty

Sasanian Empire timeline including important events and territorial evolution.

The Sassanid Empire or Sassanian Dynasty is the name used for the Persian dynasty which lasted from 224 to 651 AD.

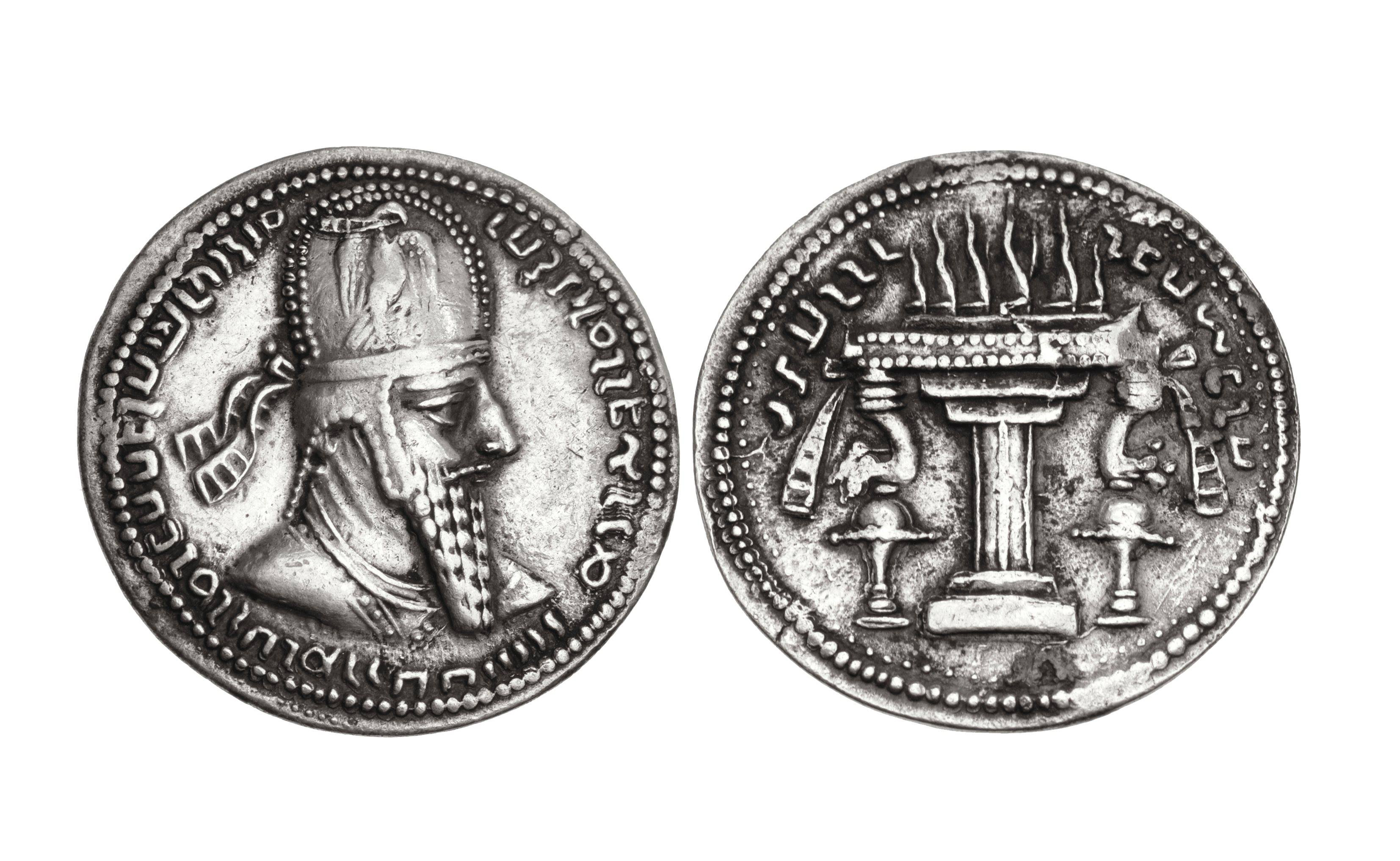
Coin of Ardashir I.

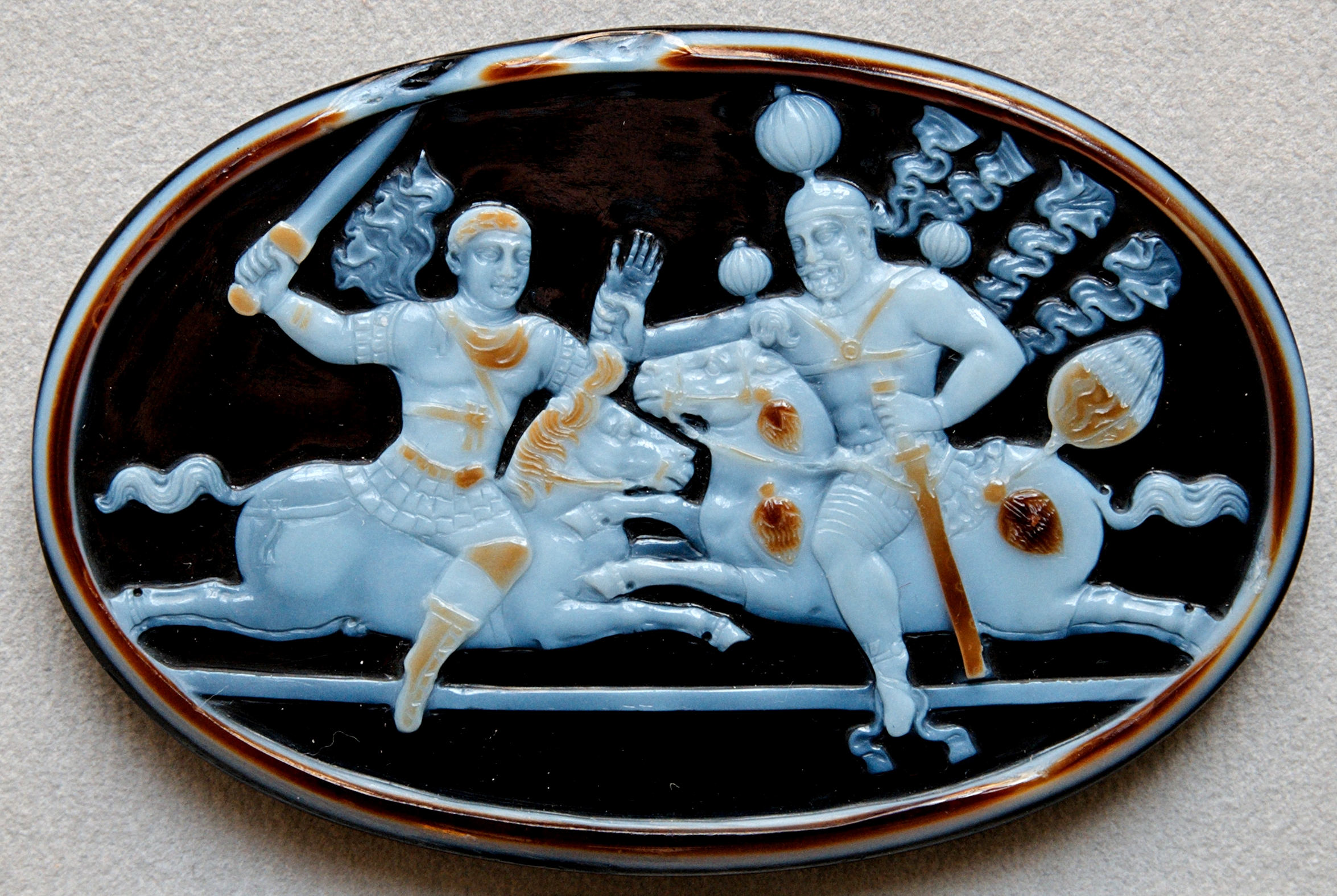
Cameo of Shapur I capturing Emperor Valerian.

- 224 – Ardashir I introduces the title Šāhanšāh (king of kings); the Sasanid reign is founded.
- c. 224–240 – Zoroastrianism belief experiences an era of recovery under the reign of Ardashir I.
- 230 – The Sassanian army assaults the Roman-controlled fraction of Upper Mesopotamia and lays hands on Nisibis, but fails to capture it.
- 237–238 – Ardashir I begins another rushes on the Eastern Roman Provinces and occupies Harran and Nisibis.
- 241 – Coronation of Shapur I.
- c. 242–273 – Mani makes a journey in Persia.
- 252–256 – Shapur I moves forward to the Eastern Roman Provinces.
- c. 259 – Defeat and capture of Valerian by Shapur I.
- c. 260 – 2nd foray of the Eastern Roman Provinces by Shapur I.
- c. 261 – Odaenathus, the ruler of Palmyra, stops the triumphant Persian troops coming back home following the looting of Antioch, scores a notable victory while Shapur is absent and drives the Persians back across the Euphrates. He fails to take Ctesiphon and the Persians are victorious.
- 271 – Coronation of Hormizd I.
- 273 – Coronation of Bahram I.
- 274 or 277 – The execution of Mani by influential Zoroastrian high priest Kartir.
- 276 – Coronation of Bahram II.

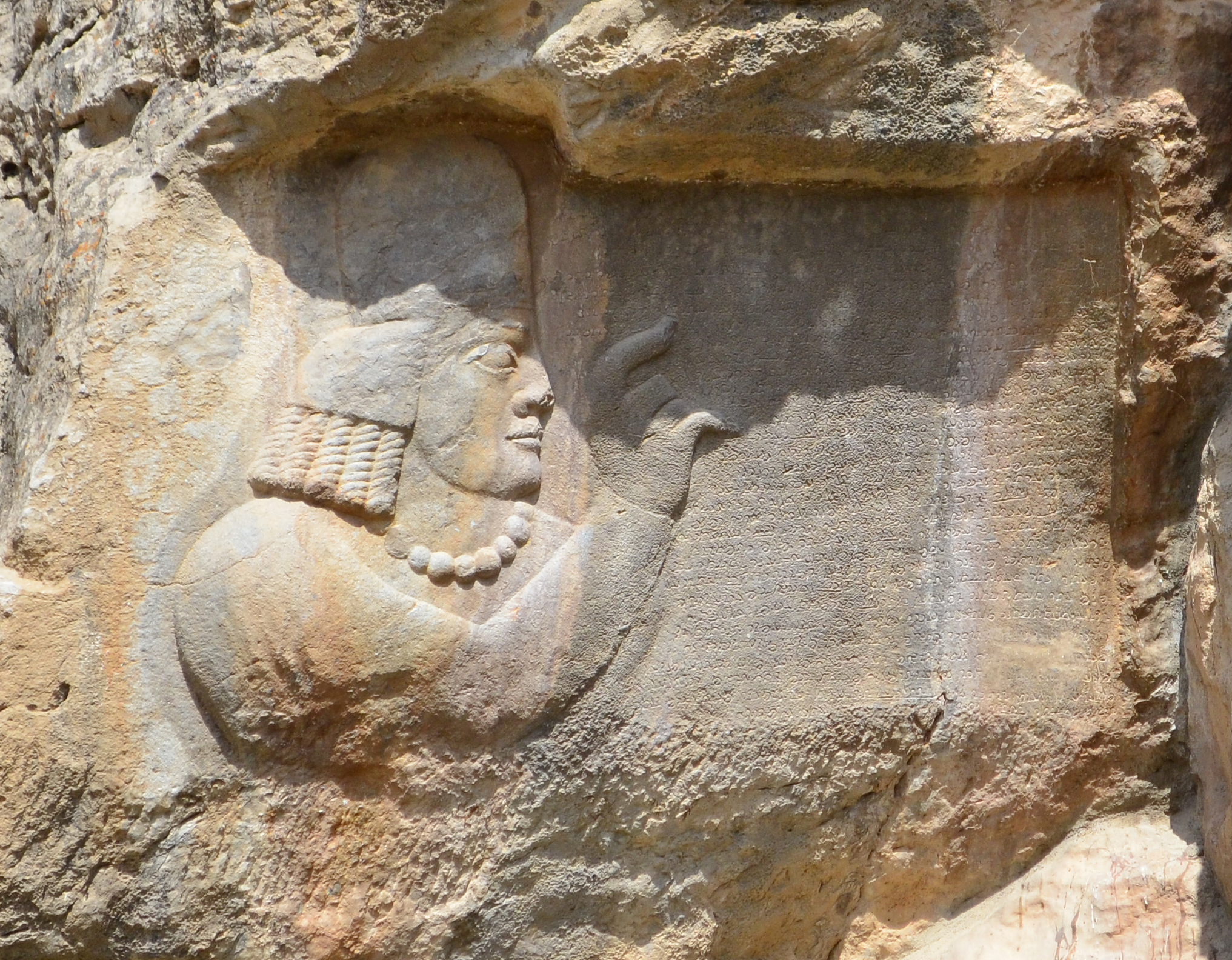
An inscription of Kartir, with a relief of him holding the text

- 276 – The Kartir is chosen as extreme power of the Zoroastrian place of worship and victimizes the supporters of other believes; his engravings at Ka'ba-ye Zartosht, Naqsh-e Rajab, and Sar Mashhad (south of Kazerun) declare to prove his principles.
- 283 – Roman Emperor Carus seizes Mesopotamia and catches Ctesiphon, but his troops comes back his unexpected passing.
- 286 – Tiridates takes the Armenian throne and the Persians are discharged from there.
- 293 – Narseh overwhelms his competitors and triumphs to the Persian throne.

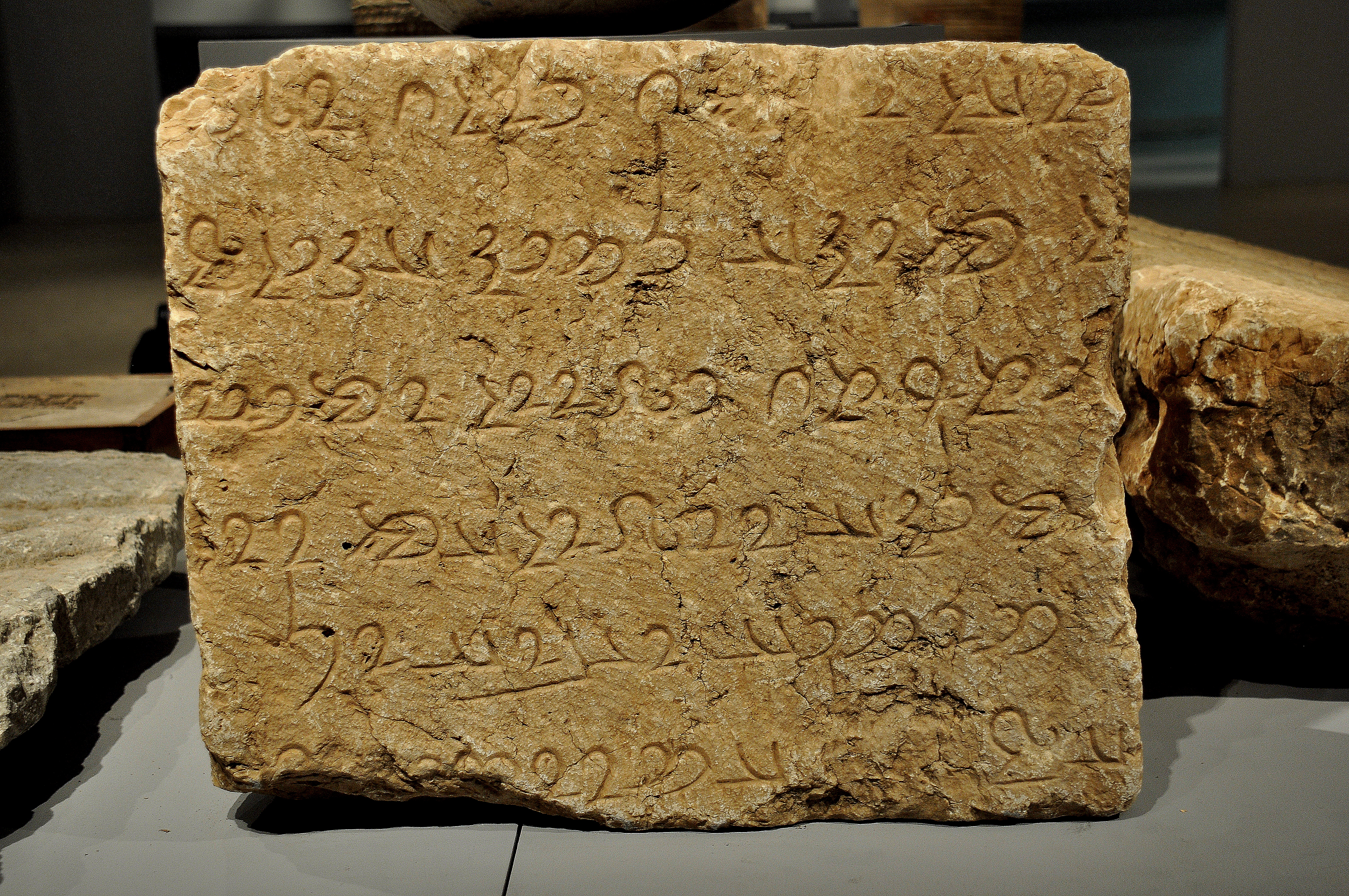
A small fragment of the Paikuli inscription; Middle Persian version

- c. 294 – Narseh’s Paikuli inscription in Iraq next to the Persian frontier.
- 296 – Narseh raids Armenia, expels Tiridates, and quells the Romans.
- 297- Roman Emperor Galerius undoes Narseh. The Treaty of Nisibis compels Narseh to abandon Armenia and Mesopotamia.
- c. 301 – The realm of Armenia is the first nation to accept Christianity as the state religion.
- 302 – Resignation of Narseh; Coronation of Hormizd II.
- 309 – Coronation of Shapur II.
- 325 – Shapur II falls upon Arab people and makes impregnable the empire’s frontiers.
- 338 – Shapur II retrieves the five regions gave in by Narseh to Rome.
- 348 – Shapur II seizes Mesopotamia.
- c. 360 – Fondation of the Kidarite kingdom.
- 363 – War between Julian and Persian troops follows his back off and demise; the surrendered territories and Nisibis are brought back to Persia.
- 376 – The armistice signed by Rome and Persia.
- 379 – Death of Shapur II and the accession of Ardashir II.
- 383 – Coronation of Shapur III.
- 399 – Coronation of Yazdegerd I, titled “the Sinner” owing to his efforts to control the influence of Zoroastrian clergy and his leniency towards other believes.
- 409 – Christian are allowed to publicly worship and to construct churches.

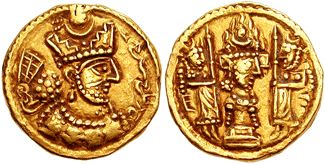
Coin of Bahram V.

- 420 – Coronation of Bahram V (Bahram Gūr).
- 421 – Peace between Persia and Rome comes to an end.
- 422 – Bahram V triumphs in driving off an assault by the Hephthalites.
- c. 425 – Bahram V brings in gypsies from India to amuse people according to the Shahnameh.
- 428 – Dissolution of Arsacid dynasty of Armenia. Establishment of Persian Armenia.
- 438 – Coronation of Yazdegerd II.
- 451 – Battle of Avarayr fought against the Christian Armenian rebels led by Vardan Mamikonian.
- 457 – Coronation of Hormizd III.
- 459 – Coronation of Peroz I.
- 484 – Hephthalite Empire conquer Peroz I.
- 484 – Coronation of Balash. The Nvarsak Treaty grants the Armenians the right to profess Christianity freely.
- 488 – Coronation of Kavadh I; expedition against Khazars.
- c. 490 – Mazdak teaches his egalitarian ideology with the benefit of Kavadh I’s support.
- c. 490 – Initiation of agrarian and tax reforms.
- 496 – Kavadh I is dethroned by his brother Djamasp.
- 499 – Return of Kavadh I with support of Hephthalites.
- 524 – War between Byzantine Empire and Sassanid Empire.
- 526 – Romans assault Persia, Armenia, and Mesopotamia, however they are beaten. Start of the Iberian War.

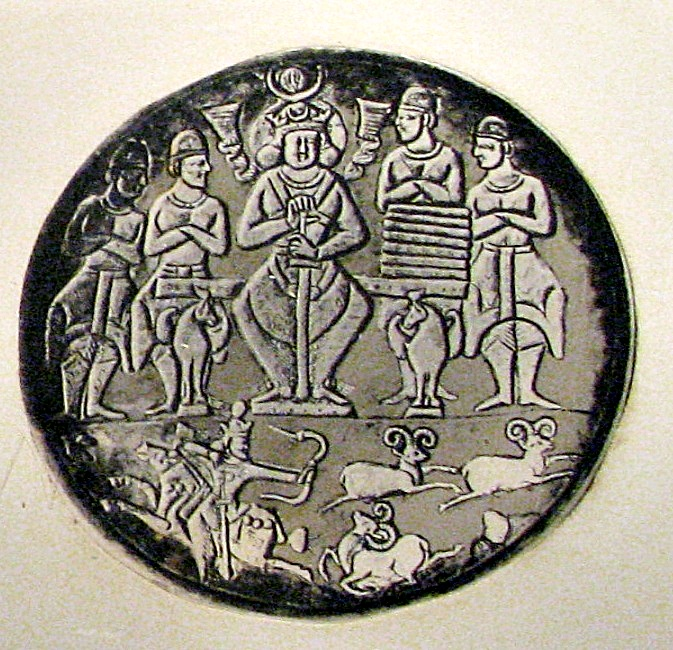
Khosrow I seated on a throne.

- 531 – Coronation of Khosrow I.
- c. 531 – Slaughter and crackdown of the Mazdak's followers.
- c. 531 – Farming, governmental, military, communal reforms.
- c. 531 – Conversion of Panchatantra, a Sanskrit-written book-story to Middle Persian.
- 533 – End of conflict between Persia and Byzantine Empire (the one that started in 524).
- 541 – Lazic War commences between the Byzantines and the Sassanids for control over Lazica.
- c. 554 – Procopius, Byzantine expert and observer to the battles between Khosrow I and Justinian I, which he writes in his De bello Persico (Latin tr., 1833), dies.

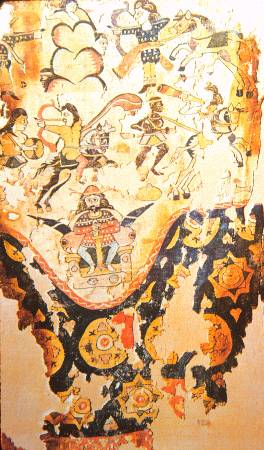
Scenes of the Abyssinian–Persian wars

- c. 570 – Conquest of Yemen.
- 579 – Death of Khosrow I and the Coronation of Hormizd IV.
- 580 – Sassanids abolish the monarchy of the Kingdom of Iberia. Direct control through self-appointed governors commences.
- 588 – First Perso-Turkic War (with Göktürks) and their defeat at the hands of the Parthian general Bahrām Chobin.
- 590 – Hormizd IV is assassinated; Coronation of Khosrow II.
- 590 – Uprising of Bahrām Chobin and his seizure of the Persian throne.
- 591 – Overwhelming of Bahrām Chobin; he escapes to the Turks in Central Asia but is killed after a year. Khosrow II regains the throne with the help of the Byzantine Emperor Maurice.
- 602 – Mutiny against the Emperor Maurice led by Phocas. Climactic Byzantine–Sasanian War of 602–628 commences.
- 603 – Khosrow II’s invasion of Byzantium in revenge for the murder of Emperor Maurice and his relatives by the tyrant Phocas.
- 614 – Conquest of Jerusalem by Persian Shahanshah Khosrow II and Parthian general Shahrbaraz; relics of the True Cross are carried off to Ctesiphon, capital of the Sasanian Empire.
- 615 – Conquest of Asia Minor by Parthian general Shahin
- 618 – Conquest of Egypt by Parthian general Shahrbaraz
- 622 – Heraclius mounts a counter-offensive against the Sasanians.
- 626 – The Sassanids alongside the allied Avars and Slavs besiege the Byzantine capital, Constantinople
- 627 – Heraclius defeats the troops of the Sasanian Empire near Nineveh.
- 628 – Deposition, trial, and execution of Khosrow II by his son and successor Kavadh II (Shīrūya); peace concluded with Byzantine Empire.
- 628 – Murdering of many Sasanian princes by Kavadh II.
- 628 – Kavadh II dies.
- 628–635 – Weakening of the Sasanian dynasty due to a succession of ineffectual kings and queens including the queens Boran and Azarmidokht; chaotic situation prevails.

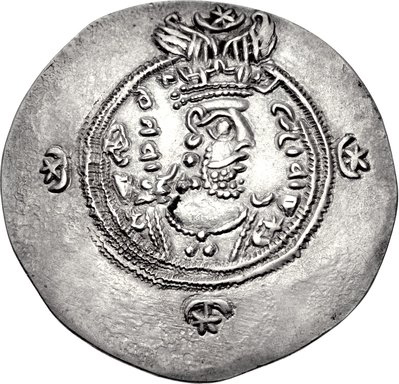
Coin of Yazdegerd III.

- 632 – Pond of Khumm event.
- 632 – The Prophet Moḥammad dies; there ensues a dispute over his succession.
- 632–634 – Abu Bakr’s caliphate.
- 633 – Yazdegerd III succeeds to the Persian throne.
- 634 – Umar elected caliph; he plans a successful invasion of Byzantine and Persian (Sasanian) lands.
- 634 – Persian victory over the Muslims at the Battle of the Bridge; Bahman Jadhuyah and Jalinus annihilate Arab force
- 635 – Arabs capture Damascus.
- 635–641 – Arab troops capture Jerusalem, Antioch, Tripoli, and Egypt.
- 636 – Persians are beaten by Arab Muslims at Qādisiyyah.
- 637 – Arab Muslims capture Ctesiphon, the Sasanian capital; Yazdegerd III escapes to Ray.
- 637 – Arab Muslim conquest of Mesopotamia.
- 642 – Final defeat of Persians by Arab Muslims at Nehavand.
- 644 – Umar (Muslim caliph) is assassinated by Abu Lu'lu'a Firuz, a Persian captive slave.
- 644–656 – Uthman’s caliphate.
- 651 – Murder of Yazdegerd III; end of the Sasanian dynasty; Persia is annexed to the Rashidun Caliphate (Islamic Empire).

== See also ==
- Timeline of Roman history
