= Siyawush =

Iranian officer

- Died: c. 520; Ctesiphon
- Military career
- Rank: Arteshtaran-salar

Siyawush (also spelled Siyavash), known in Byzantine sources as Seoses (Σεόσης), was an Iranian officer, who served as the head of the Sasanian army (arteshtaran-salar) during the second reign of the Sasanian king (shah) Kavad I (r. 498–531). In c. 520, he was accused of purposely misusing peace negotiations with the Byzantine Empire, and was thus removed from power and executed.

== Biography ==
In 496, the Sasanian shah Kavad I was overthrown by the nobility and replaced by his brother Jamasp. He was imprisoned in the "Prison of Oblivion" in Khuzestan. With the aid of his sister and close-friend Siyawush, Kavad managed to free himself from imprisonment, and went to the court of the Hephthalite king, where he took refuge. There Kavad gained the support of the Hephthalite king, and also married the latter's daughter (who was Kavad's own niece). In 498, Kavad returned to Iran with a Hephthalite army. When Kavad crossed the domains of the Kanarangiyan family in Khorasan, he was met by a member of the family, Adergoudounbades, who agreed to lend his aid. Another noble who supported Kavad was Zarmihr Karen, a son of Sukhra.

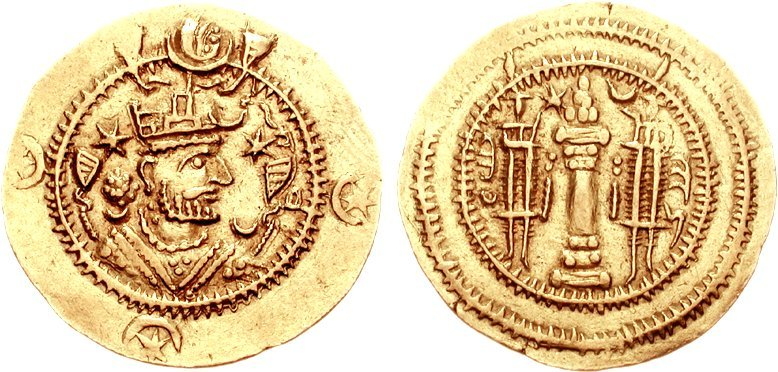
Coin of Kavad I.

Jamasp, including the nobility and clergy did not put any resistance as they wanted to prevent another civil war. They made an agreement with Kavad that he would be shah again with the understanding that he would not hurt Jamasp nor the elite. Jamasp was spared, however Gushnaspdad and other nobles who had plotted against Kavad were executed. Generally, however, Kavad secured his position by lenience. Adergoudounbades was appointed as the new head of the Kanarangiyan, while Siyawush was appointed as the head of the Sasanian army (arteshtaran-salar). Kavad's reclaim of his throne displays the troubled circumstances of the empire, where in a time of anarchy a small force was able to overwhelm the nobility-clergy alliance.

In c. 520, Kavad, in order to secure the succession of his youngest son Khosrow I, whose position was threatened by rival brothers and the Mazdakite sect, proposed that the Byzantine Emperor Justin I adopt him. The proposal was initially greeted with enthusiasm by the Byzantine Emperor and his nephew, Justinian, but Justin's quaestor, Proclus, opposed the move, due to the concern of Khosrow possibly later trying to take over the Byzantine throne. The Byzantines instead made a counter-proposal to adopt Khosrow not as a Roman, but a barbarian. In the end the negotiations did not a consensus. Khosrow reportedly felt insulted by the Byzantines, and his attitude deteriorated towards them. Mahbod, who had along with Siyawush acted as the diplomats of the negotiations, accused the latter of purposely sabotaging the negotiations. Further accusations were made towards Siyawush, which included the reverence of new deities and having his dead wife buried, which was a violation of Iranian laws. Siyawush was thus most likely a Mazdakite, the religious sect that Kavad originally supported but now had withdrawn his support from. Although Siyawush was a close friend of Kavad and had helped him escape from imprisonment, the latter did not try to prevent his execution, seemingly with the purpose of restricting Siyawush's immense authority as the head of the Sasanian army, a post which was disliked by the other nobles. Siyawush was executed, and his office was abolished.

== Bibliography ==
=== Ancient works ===
- Procopius, History of the Wars.

=== Modern works ===
- Schindel, Nikolaus (2013). "Kawād I i. Reign". Encyclopaedia Iranica, Vol. XVI, Fasc. 2. pp. 136–141.
- Sundermann, W. (1986). "Artēštārān sālār". Encyclopaedia Iranica, Vol. II, Fasc. 6. p. 662.
- Daryaee, Touraj (2014). Sasanian Persia: The Rise and Fall of an Empire. I.B.Tauris. pp. 1–240. ISBN 978-0857716668.
- Frye, R. N. (1983), "Chapter 4", The political history of Iran under the Sasanians, The Cambridge History of Iran, vol. 3, Cambridge University Press, ISBN 978-0-521-20092-9
- Pourshariati, Parvaneh (2008). Decline and Fall of the Sasanian Empire: The Sasanian-Parthian Confederacy and the Arab Conquest of Iran. London and New York: I.B. Tauris. ISBN 978-1-84511-645-3.
