= Storbukås =

Storbukås is a surname. Notable people with the surname include:

- Knut Storbukås (born 1943), Norwegian singer
- Stian Storbukås (born 1978), Norwegian politician

== See also ==
- Stor Bezashk
