= Arteshtaran-salar =

Arteshtaran-salar (strictly transliterated as artēštārān-sālār, meaning "chief of the warriors") was a high office of the military of the Sasanian Empire.

The Middle Persian titles artēštārān-sālār and wāst(a)ryōšān-sālār are both derived from the Avestan designations of the social classes vāstryō-fšuyant ("cattle-breeder") and raθaēštā ("warrior").

According to al-Tabari, the rank was above spahbed and below argbed (which was reserved for the royal family members). According to Procopius, the bearer of the title (in Greek: ἀδρασταδάραν σαλάνης adrastadáran salánēs) was "a generalissimo invested with quite exceptional powers" in the 500s AD.

The title is first recorded in the book Karnamag-i Ardashir-i Pabagan. The first recorded bearer of the title is Kārd (or Kārdār), the third son of the chief minister Mihr-Narseh, per an account from Khwaday-Namag. It is possible that the rank was established by Mihr-Narseh himself. According to Procopius, the office was held last by Siyawush. He claims that he was the first and only bearer of the title, but this is doubted. The title disappears from records since the reign of Kavadh I, which means it was probably synonymous to Eran Spahbed and was made obsolete during Khosrow I's reforms.

== Sources ==
- Sundermann, W. (1986). "Artēštārān sālār". Encyclopaedia Iranica, Vol. II, Fasc. 6. p. 662.
- رجبی, پرویز (1398). "ارتشتاران‌سالار". دائرةالمعارف بزرگ اسلامی. Vol. 2.
