= Paygan-salar =

The Pāygān-sālār were commanders of the infantry units (paygan) within the Sassanid armies. The Paygan-salar were very respected and trustworthy men, they would be guarded by the elite Dailamites.

The Paygān-Sālārs may have also acted as warden of prisons.

== Sources ==
- Morony, Michael G. (2005) [1984]. Iraq After The Muslim Conquest. Gorgias Press LLC. ISBN 978-1-59333-315-7.
- Sassanian Elite Cavalry AD 224-642
- History Magazine
- Historiae
- Peter Wilcox, Rome's Enemies 3: Parthians and Sassanid Persians (Osprey Publishing 2001). ISBN 0-85045-688-6.
- David Nicolle, Sassanian Armies: the Iranian empire early 3rd to mid-7th centuries AD (Montvert Publishing 1996). ISBN 1-874101-08-6.
