= Cameo with Valerian and Shapur I =

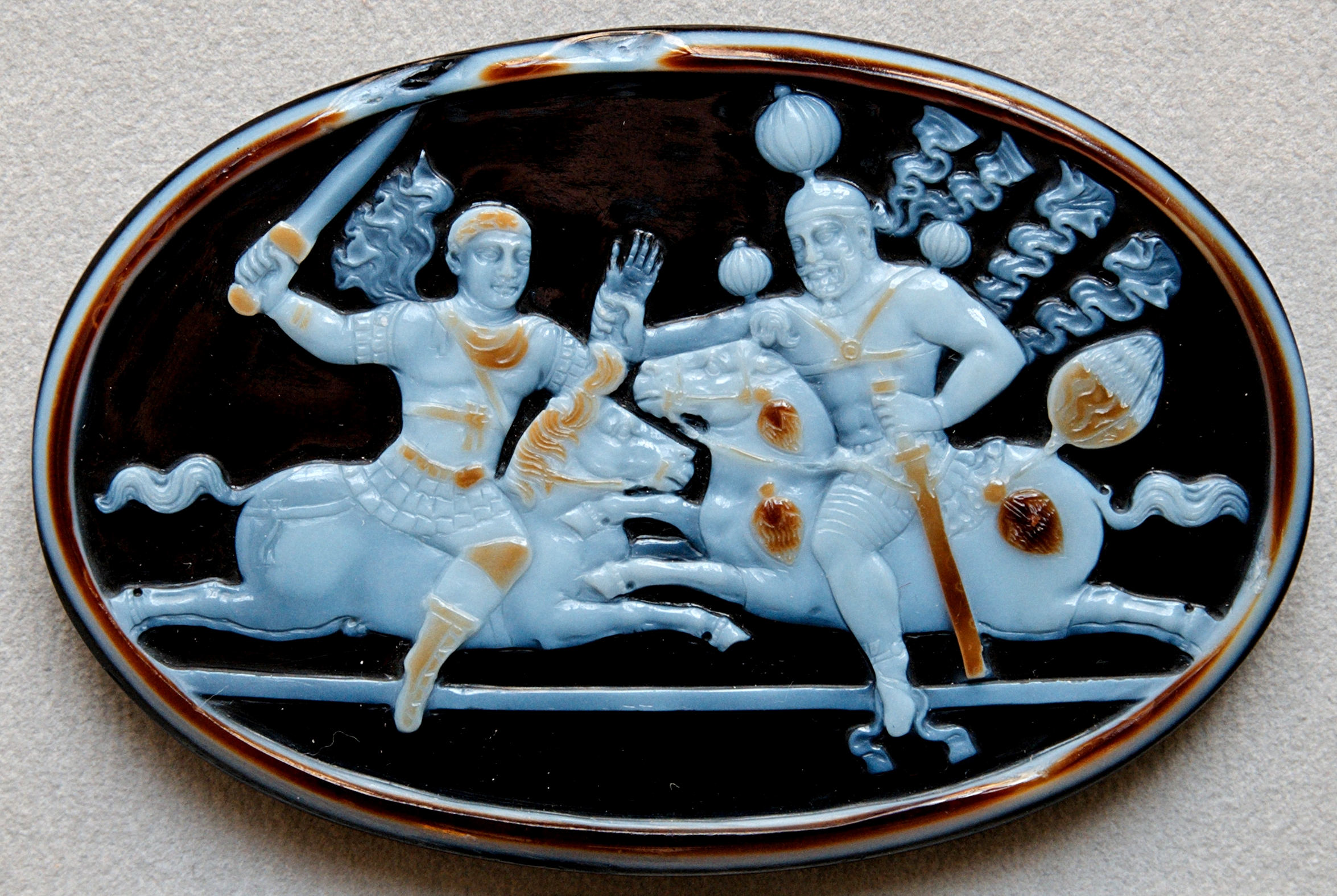
Cameo with Valerian and Shapur I

The Cameo with Valerian and Shapur I is now on display in the Cabinet des Médailles of the Bibliothèque nationale de France in Paris. It has the inventory number Camée 360. and was bought in 1893. The cameo is 6,8 cm high and 10,3 cm wide and made of sardonyx, and is thought to date to about 260 AD. For the carving, the different colored layers of the stone was used. The background is dark, the figures are white and details are again dark again as they are on the highest level.

The cameo shows two riders. Both horses, which are unrealistically depicted as pony-sized, are in flying gallop. On the right side appears the Sasanian king Shapur I (reigned AD 241–272). He wears a helmet with a globe crest. His shoulders also have attached globes. His right arm is holding the left arm of the Roman emperor Valerian (reigned AD 253–260). The Roman emperor holds in his right hand a sword (gladius). He is beardless and has on his head a laurel wreath, identifying him as Roman emperor. Though the client was presumably Sasanian, the style is Greco-Roman, as the artist presumably was.

The scene shows most likely the capturing of emperor Valerian by Shapur I in the Battle of Edessa in AD 260. The battle was a huge success for the Sasanian troops as they managed to seize the Roman emperor, an event that was celebrated on several monuments.

In 256, the Sasanians conquered the Greek city of Antioch and it seems likely that many craftsmen and artists were taken. It seems possible that the cameo was made by such an artist. Carved gems was a Ptolemaic invention and a common art in the Greco-Roman culture that was also adopted by the Sasanians. The design of the Shapur Cameo combines both Roman and Sasanian styles.
