= Siege of Caesarea in Cappadocia (260) =

Siege of Caesarea by Sasanian forces (260)

Siege of Caesarea (260)
- Part of the Shapur I's third Roman campaign
Date	260
Location	Caesarea, Cappadocia (modern-day Kayseri, Turkey)
Result	Sasanian victory
Territorial changes	Sasanians capture Caesarea

Belligerents
Sassanid Empire	Roman Empire

Commanders and leaders
Shapur I Hormizd I	Demosthenes

The siege of Caesarea by the Sasanians under Shapur I took place following their siege of the Roman city of Antioch in 260 which followed their major victory over the Romans in the Battle of Edessa.

== Background ==
The siege took place during a Sasanian invasion of the Roman east. Caesarea during that time had a large population (about 400,000 inhabitants).

== Siege ==
The Sassanids were unable to take the city, and took a Roman as captive and tortured him until he revealed another route they could use. The Sassanids then raided Caesarea during the night, killing every Roman soldier.

== Aftermath ==
According to Percy Sykes, "He [Shapur] captured Caesarea Mazaca, the greatest city in Cappadocia; but probably from the lack of a standing army, again made no attempt to organize and administer, or even to retain, his conquests. He merely killed and ravaged with barbarous severity".
