= Battle of Edessa =

260 Sasanian victory over Rome

Coordinates: 37.1500°N 38.8000°E

- Part of the Shapur I's third Roman campaign
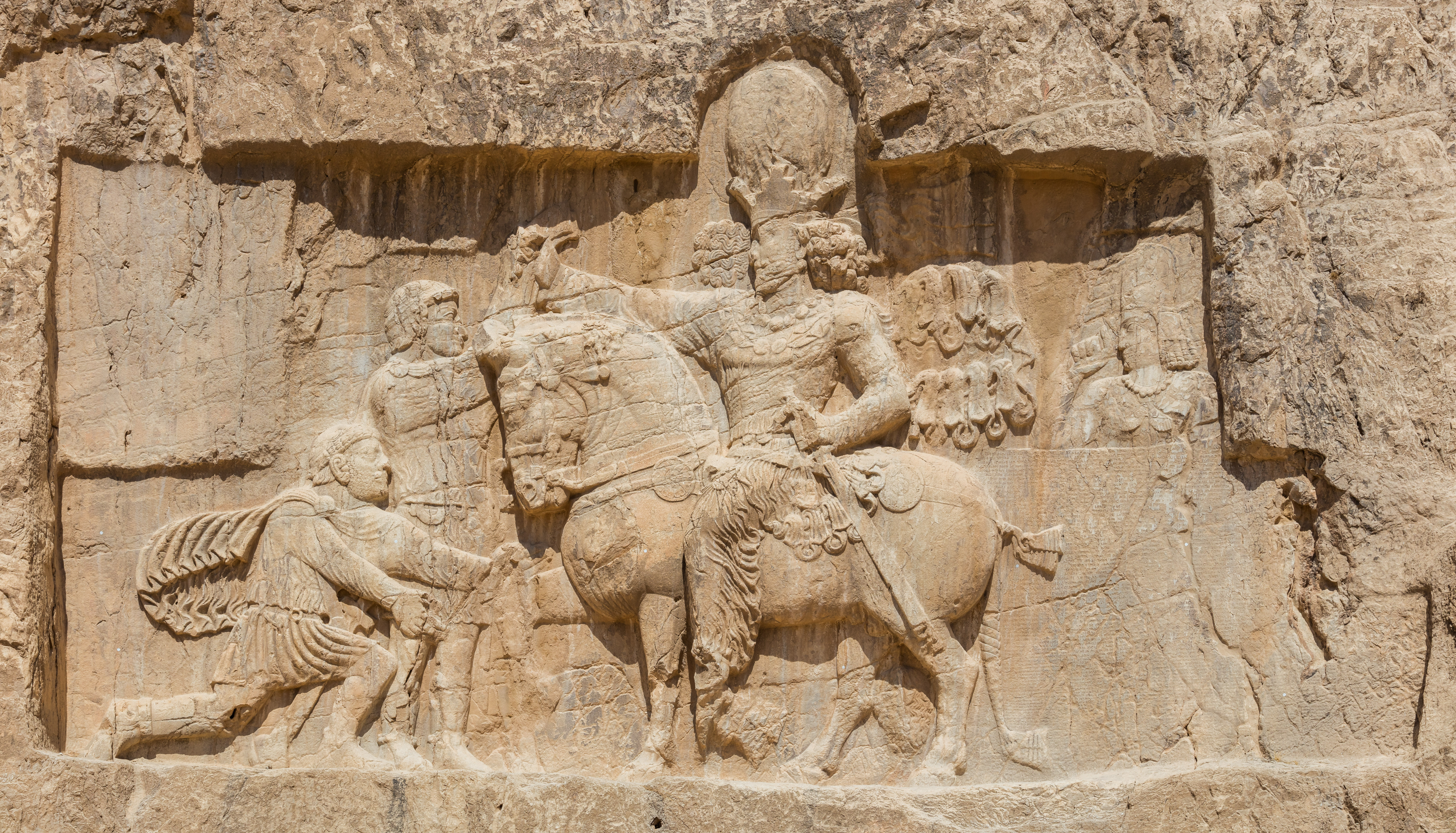
- A rock-face relief dating to the third century at Naqsh-e Rostam, depicting the triumph of Shapur I over the Roman Emperor Valerian.
Date	Spring 260
Location	Edessa, Osroene (modern-day Şanlıurfa, Turkey)
Result	Sasanian victory

Belligerents
Sasanian Empire	Roman Empire; Germanic and Goth allies

Commanders and leaders
Shapur I	Emperor Valerian (POW)

Strength
Unknown	70,000

Casualties and losses
Minimal	Entire force or more than 60,000 c. 10,000 killed in the first battle

The Battle of Edessa took place between the armies of the Roman Empire, under the command of Emperor Valerian, and the Sasanian Empire under Shapur I, in Edessa (now the Turkish city of Urfa) in 260. The Roman army was defeated and captured in its entirety by the Sasanian forces; for the first time, a Roman emperor was taken prisoner.

== Background and prelude ==
Prior to the battle, Shapur I had penetrated several times deeply into Roman territory, conquering and plundering Antioch in Syria in 253 or 256. After defeating the usurper Aemilianus and assuming imperial power for himself, Valerian arrived in the eastern provinces as soon as he could (254 or 255) and gradually restored order. Soon he had to confront a naval Gothic invasion in northern Asia Minor. The Goths ravaged Pontus and moved south into Cappadocia. An attempt by Valerian and his army in Antiocheia to intercept them failed because of the plague. While Valerian's army was in that weakened state, Shapur invaded northern Mesopotamia in 260, probably in early spring.

== Battle ==
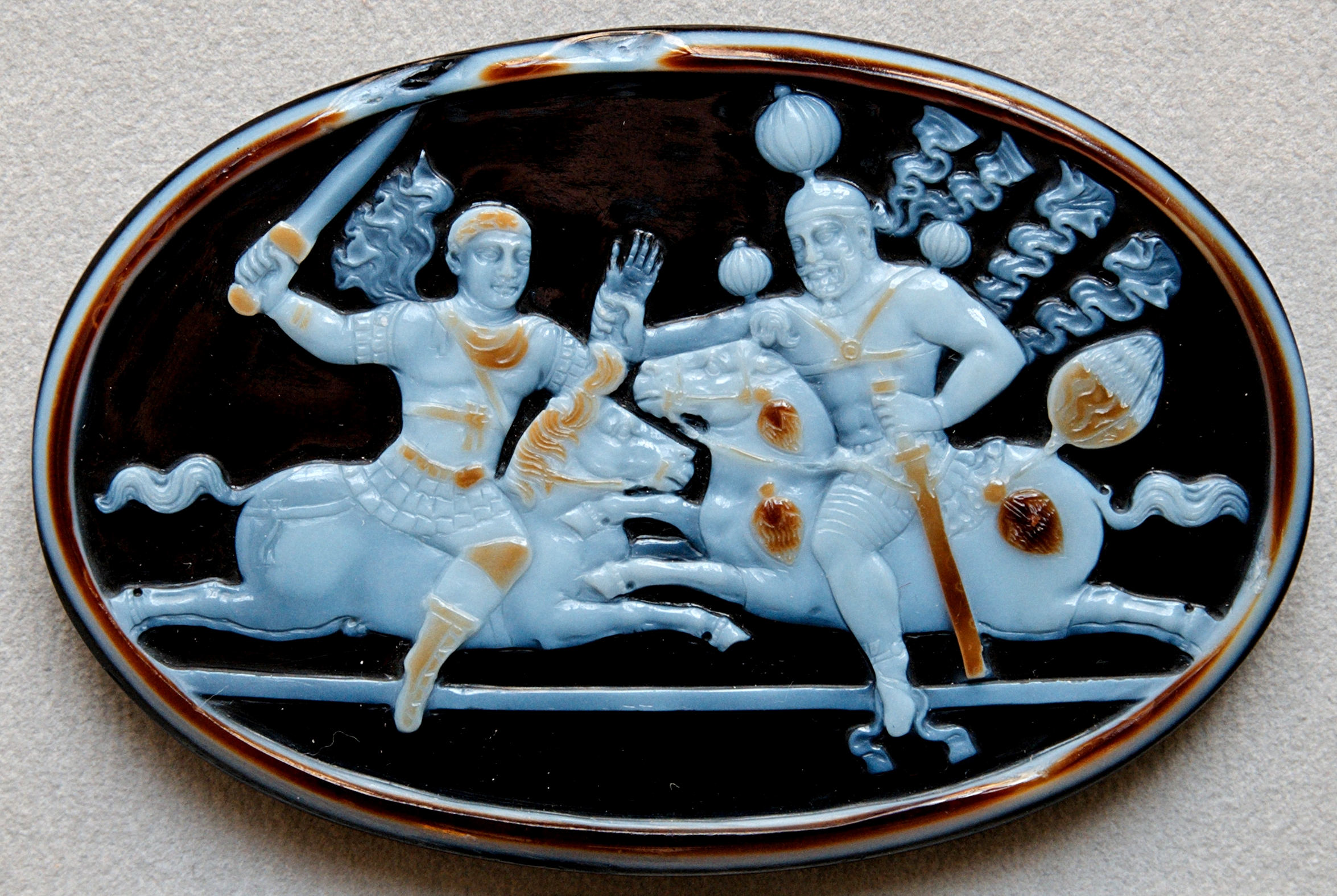
A fine cameo showing an equestrian single combat (mard o mard) between Shapur I and Valerian in which the latter is seized, according to Shapur's own statement, "with our own hand"

In his sixties, the aged Valerian marched eastward to the Sasanian borders. According to Shapur I's inscription at the Ka'ba-ye Zartosht, Valerian's army comprised men from almost every part of the Roman Empire as well as Germanic allies. The two armies met between Carrhae and Edessa and the Romans were thoroughly defeated, with Valerian being captured alongside the remnant of his forces.

According to Roman sources, which are not very clear, the Roman army was defeated and besieged by the Sasanian forces. Valerian subsequently tried to negotiate, but he was captured; it is possible that his army surrendered after that. The prisoners included, according to Shapur's claims, many other high-ranking officials, including a praetorian prefect, possibly Successianus. Some sources also make the claim that Shapur went back on his word and seized the emperor after already agreeing to truce negotiations.

However, these accounts are typical of Roman description of defeats: incompetency of generals and treachery of foreigners. According to Ian Hughes (2023), the Romans suffered c. 10,000 casualties in battle, and Valerian was captured similar to what Shapur I reported. The rest of the Roman army retreated to Edessa, but were forced to surrender to save their lives.

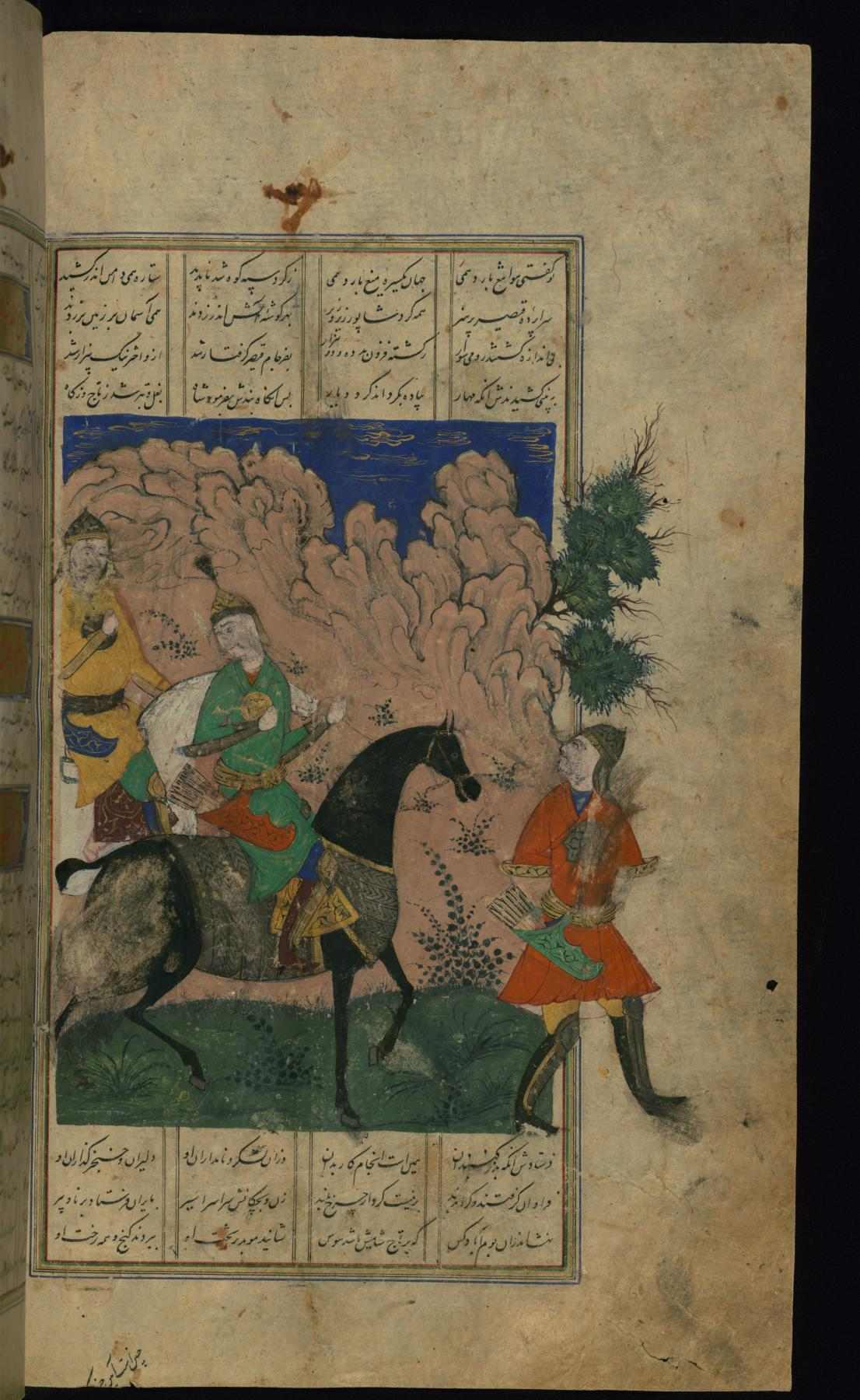
"Shapur Captures the King of Rum", Persian miniature from Shahnameh

== Aftermath ==
There are varying accounts as to Valerian's fate following his capture at the hands of Shapur.

Some scholars claim Shapur sent Valerian and some of his army to the city of Bishapur, where they lived in relatively good conditions. Shapur used the remaining soldiers in engineering and development plans, as the Romans were skilled builders and artisans. Band-e Kaisar (Caesar's dam) is one of the remnants of Roman engineering located near the ancient city of Shushtar.

According to another source (Lactantius), Shapur humiliated Valerian, using the former emperor as a human stepstool while mounting his horse. He was reportedly kept in a cage and was humiliated for the Sasanian emperor's pleasure, according to Aurelius Victor. Upon his death, Valerian's body was allegedly skinned and stuffed with, depending on the account, manure or straw, to produce a trophy of Roman submission preserved in a Sasanian temple.

However, some other accounts stipulate he was treated with respect, and that allegations of torture may have been fabricated by Christian historians of late antiquity to show the perils that befell persecutors of Christianity.

After the victory at Edessa, Shapur appears to have divided his army into at least five groups to raid Anatolia more widely, ravaging Cilicia, Cappadocia, Pamphylia and Lycaonia. He captured the Cilician capital of Tarsus and took the city of Caesarea Cappadocia, deporting its citizens, claimed to be 400,000 inhabitants, to the southern provinces of the Sasanian Empire. One of the Sasanian raiding forces was repulsed by Balista at Pompeiopolis in western Cilicia, killing 3000 Persians, while the main Sasanian army was operating in eastern Cilicia and Cappadocia, although Ballista's victory did not prevent the advance nor hinder the withdrawal of a different Sasanian force operating in coastal Cilicia, which sacked cities as far west as Selinus. Odenathus of Palmyra harassed Shapur's forces as they withdrew across the Euphrates, killing many.

Valerian's defeat at Edessa served as the catalyst for a series of revolts that would lead to the temporary fragmentation of the Roman Empire. In the East, Macrianus used his control of Valerian's treasury to proclaim his sons Macrianus Minor and Quietus as emperors. Along the Danubian frontier, Ingenuus and Regalianus were also proclaimed emperors. In the West, the Roman governor Postumus took advantage of Gallienus' distraction to murder the Imperial heir, Saloninus, and take control of what is now called the Gallic Empire.

== See also ==
- List of military disasters

== Sources ==
- Lactantius, De Mortibus Persecutorum, v.
- Zosimus, New History, i.
- Abdolhossein Zarinkoob, Ruzgaran: tarikh-i Iran az aghz ta saqut saltnat Pahlvi, Sukhan, 1999. ISBN 964-6961-11-8
- Potter, David S., The Roman Empire at Bay AD 180–395, Routledge, 2004. ISBN 0-415-10058-5
