= Paygan =

- Active: 224-644
- Allegiance: Sasanian Empire
- Type: Light infantry
- Engagements: Roman-Persian wars, Muslim conquest of Iran

The Paygān (also known as Paighan) were the conscript light infantry unit within the Sasanian army and formed the bulk of its infantry force.

During peacetime, the corps could have had police force roles.

== Recruitment ==
The Paygan were a conscription force, recruited from the peasant population of the Sasanian Empire. According to the Chronicon Anonymum, the vast majority (120,000) of Sasanian Emperor Khosrow I Anushirvan's army of 183,000 was made up of Paygan. The Paygan were frequently used in sieges and served as pages for the Savaran cavalry. They were also tasked to guard baggage trains, encroachment missions, and the excavation of mines. These troops would generally have had the lowest morale of all troops in the Sasanian army and would cluster together for mutual protection.

According to Arab historians, during the Battle of al-Qādisiyyah the Persian commander Rostam Farrokhzād refused to provide the Paygan troops with food and water the night before the battle. Instead, in the Arab camp, all soldiers there were being provided with supplies, including the peasants. This may be the reason why many of the Paygan soldiers in the army defected to the Arab side before and after the battle. In the Battle of Dara, for instance, the Paygan dropped their shields and abandoned the fields when the Savaran heavy cavalry was defeated.

== Weapons ==
The Paygan were lightly armed with short light wood or wickerwork shields, boiled leather cap and short spears. Some of the Paygan would have, however, had to equip themselves with their own weapons. These tended to be agricultural equipment such as pitchforks, axes and sickles. The Paygan would have lacked decent armor, making them very vulnerable in hand-to-hand combat. They would have stood little chance against Roman troops. This is the reason why Sasanians developed their own heavy infantry to counter that of Rome's.

Belisarius' remarks on Sassanian infantry forces:

Right for you to despise them. For their whole infantry is nothing more than a crowd of pitiable peasants who come into battle for no other purpose than to dig through walls ... and in general to serve the soldiers. For this reason they have no weapons at all with which they might trouble their opponents, and they only hold before themselves those enormous shields and huge elephants.

Ammianus Marcellinus, Rerum Gestarum, 19.7.3 remarks on Sasanian troops:

"And day was now dawning, when mail-clad soldiers underspread the entire heaven, and the dense forces moved forward, not as before in disorder, but led by the [p. 505] slow notes of the trumpets and with no one running forward, protected too by pent-houses and holding before them wicker hurdles."

The professional Sasanian infantry (which had a similar name) and the peasant levies are often confused as a single force in Roman sources. Paygan's registration on the state's rolls suggest that they were a paid, professional force.

== See also ==
- Spahbed
- Byzantine army
- Late Roman army
- Roman-Persian Wars
- Persian war elephants
- Cataphract
- Aswaran
