= History of Gilan =

Gilan, located in Iran's northern region

Gīlān is an Iranian province at the southwestern coast of the Caspian Sea. This articles discusses its history.

== Ancient times ==
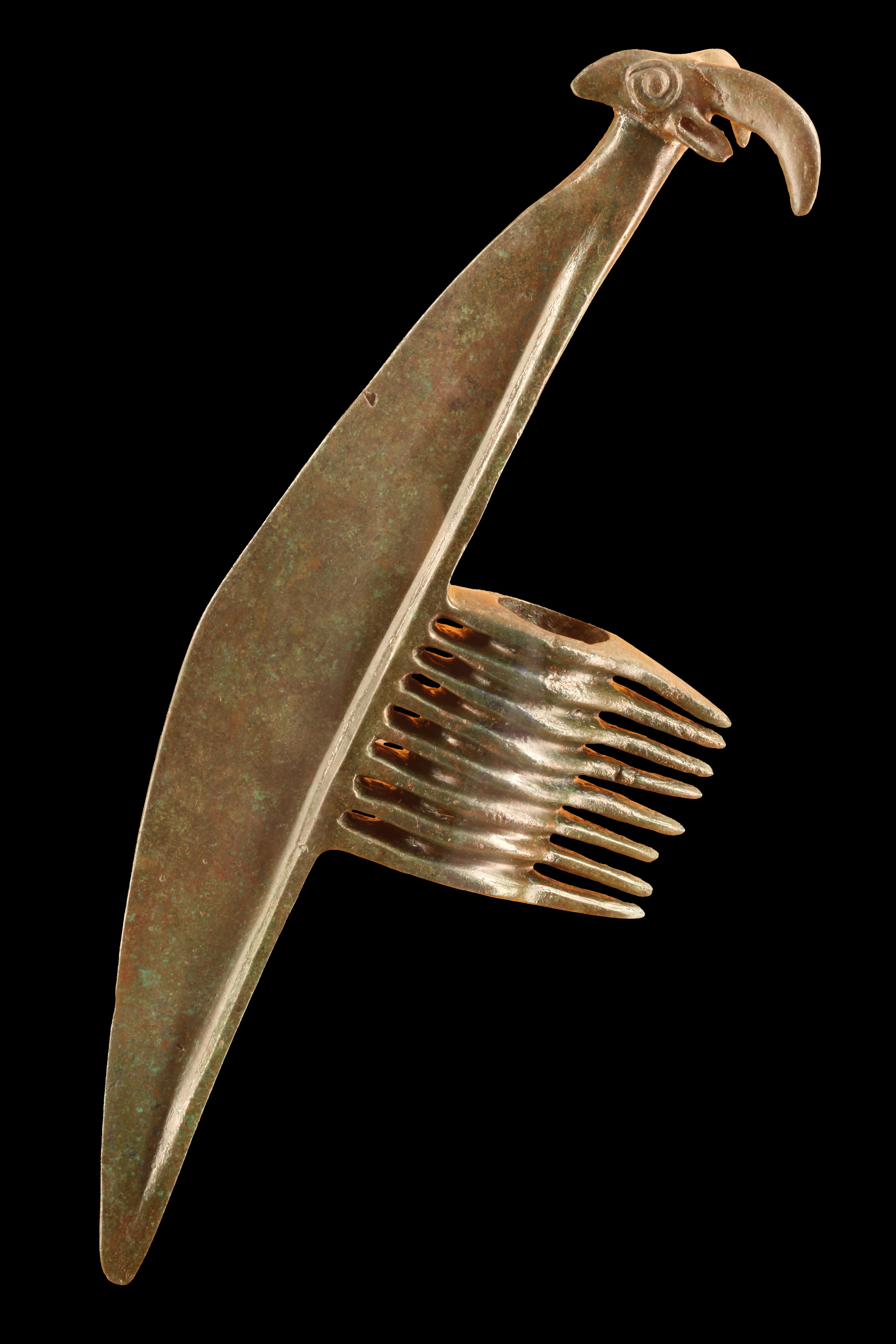
Halberd-axe head with the head of a mouflon. late 2nd millennium–early 1st millennium BC. From Amlash, Gilan, Iran.

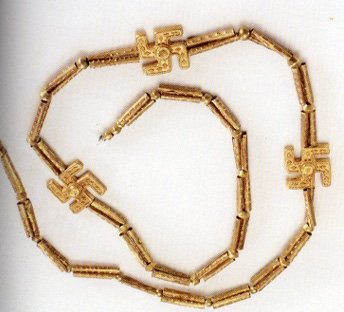
Golden necklace of three Swastikas found in Marlik, Gilan, dates back to first millennium B.C.

Until the 7th century AD, Gilan was in the sphere of influence of the consecutive Achaemenid, Seleucid, Parthian, and Sasanian empires ruling Iran.

It seems that the Gelae (Gilites) have entered the region in south of the Caspian coast and west of the Amardos River (later Safidrud) in the second or first century B.C.E. Pliny identifies them with the Cadusii which were living there previously. It is more likely that they were a separate people, and had come from the region of Dagestan, and taken the place of the Kadusii. The fact that the native inhabitants of Gilan have originating roots in the Caucasus is also supported by genetics and language, as Gilaks are genetically closer to ethnic peoples of the Caucasus (such as the Georgians) than they are towards other ethnic groups in Iran. Also their languages shares certain typologic features with Caucasian languages.

Later, these newly arrived groups also crossed the Amardos river and, together with the Deylamites, superseded the Amardi. They are mentioned as mercenaries of the Sasanian kings like the Deylamites, but it does seem that they had come under their effective rule. It is said that Dabuyids had originated in Gīlān before moving to Tabaristan. In 553, Gilan and Amol are mentioned as the seat of a Nestorian bishop.

== Early Islamic period ==
At the beginning of the Islamic period, Gilaks resided in the territories extending to the east of the Safidrud in the lowlands along the sea as eastern as Ḵošam (Arabicized Hawsam, modern Rudsar) (which is called Bīa-pīš). In the west of Safidrud (which is called Bīa-pas) Gilites lived in the lowlands located in north of Tārom and Talesh was in their western and northwestern border. Arabs did not occupy Gilan. There exist reports stating that Gīlān paid tribute to the caliphate in the early ʿAbbasid era, but these are most probably referring to western Gīlān. Dailamites protected eastern Gīlān effectively who lived in the mountains against Muslim attacks. Early Islamic sources seldom pointed to the Gilites, mostly together with the Deylamites. In the legends Gīl a brother of Deylam, were their ancestors. Gilites and Deylamites, spoke a northwestern Iranian dialect largely inapprehensible to other Persian speakers. In the later 9th and early 10th century mass conversion to Islam occurred in Gīlān. Many Sunnite traditionists and Ḥanbalī scholars with the nesba Gilani have risen from western Gilan since the 11th century. Eastern Gilan was main stronghold of Zaidi dailamites and contributed to the “Deylamite Expansion” (as Minorsky calls it) of the 10th century.

Abu Eshaq Sabi wrote that Gilanis were divided into four tribes. He described that these tribes appear mostly like clans of a small nobility and says that all of them were in the central region of Gilan around Lahijan and Rasht. The Gilanis as well as Daylamites considered a line of kings belonging to the royal clan named Shahanshahavand and lived in the region of Dakhel, northwest of Lahijan. Lili ibn Shahdust (Noman) who was killed in battle in 921 after conquering Tus, was one of their kings. The Ziyarid dynasty that ruled Gorgan and Tabarestan from 932 to the last quarter of the 11th century was a Gilani royal clan.

Gilan and Deylaman were still semi-independent and fragmented even after Dailamite expansion and when they converted to Islam. Ziarids, Buyids, and later Saljuqs tried to apply influence from outside of Gilan and in some periods could get tribute, but not to impose government or any regular taxation. The Zyarids of eastern Gilan supported Alids in Howsam. Local chieftains who were based on clans controlled the country. In the 12th century Hawsam was replaced by Lahijan as the seat the Alids. Lahijan which is now the largest town in eastern Gilan was considered Dailamite until the 10th century.

Gilan initially remained independent under the Mongol Ilkhanids. In 1306-7 the Il-khan Oljāytū started a major campaign to conquer Gilan. The Mongol forces faced heavy losses, and Öljaitü only nominally gained recognition of his overlordship. Hence Gilan was included in the Il-khanid empire but was still ruled by its local clans. After 1367-68 ʿAlī Kia b. Amīr Kia Malāṭī, an ʿAlid leader of Zaydī penitents, gained control over eastern Gilan being supported by the Marʿašī sayyeds ruling in Mazandaran. He and his descendants established themselves in Lāhījān and ruled over the whole eastern Gilan until the early Safavid era. In western Gilan the Sunnite Shafiʿite Esḥāqvand dynasty gained control from the middle of the 13th century. They who were seated in Fuman, expanded its control over all of western Gīlān. Both dynasties were removed by the Safavid Shah ʿAbbās I in 1592, and Gīlān began to be ruled by governors appointed by the central government.

Ispahbads of Gilan was a small principality which seated in Astara ruled in Talish during the Middle Ages.

== Safavid era ==
Two local dynasties ruled over Gilan in the late 15th-early 16th century. Shafiʿite Amīra Dobbāj of the Dobbāj/Esḥāqvand clan ruled over the Sunnite area of Bīa-pas (with Fuman, and, later, Rasht as its center). They traced their dynasty to the Sasanian kings and before them and the prophet Isaac (Eshaq) simultaneously. Shiite Amir Kia dynasty ruled over Bīa-pīš (with Lāhījān as its capital) which was mostly Shiite. They also traced their lineage to Sasanians.

Gilan recognized twice, for brief periods of time, the suzerainty of the Ottoman Empire without actually rendering tribute to the Sublime Porte, in 1534 and 1591.

The Safavid emperor, Shah Abbas I ended the rule of Khan Ahmad Khan, the last semi-independent ruler of Gilan, and annexed the province directly to his empire. From this point in history onward, rulers of Gilan were appointed by the Iranian Shah. Starting from the Safavid all the way to the Qajar era, Gilan was settled by large amounts of Georgians, Circassians, Armenians, and other Peoples of the Caucasus were settled in the region whose descendants still live or linger across Gilan. A significant amount of these large amounts of Georgians, and Circassians are already assimilated into the mainstream Gilaks. The history of Georgian settlement is described by Iskandar Beg Munshi, the author of the 17th century Tarikh-e Alam-Ara-ye Abbasi, and both the Circassian and Georgian settlements by Pietro Della Valle, among other authors.

The Safavid empire became weak towards the end of the 17th century CE. By the early 18th century, the once mighty Safavid empire was in the grips of civil war. The ambitious Peter I of Russia (Peter the Great) sent a force that captured Rasht and the rest of Gilan during the Russo-Persian War (1722–23). The war, which resulted in the Russian occupation of the Iranian territories in northern contemporary Iran, the North Caucasus, and Transcaucasia, was finalized with the Treaty of Saint Petersburg of 1723, which amongst the other aforementioned territories, made Gilan a part of the Russian Empire. Gilan was returned to Iran, now led by Nader Shah, following the Treaty of Resht 10 years later.

== 18th century ==
In the early 18th century the Safavids began to decline and finally lost power in 1722, causing the country to become chaotic. Foreign powers became interested in occupying the country, particularly its northern parts. Russia dispatched armies to invade Gilan. Afshars, Zands and Afghans arose in this era. During this period Gilan was mostly ruled by local chieftains that governed independently or paid tribute to the above-mentioned powerful groups and their generals and maintained their relative independence in this way. The division of Gilan between Bīa-pas and Bīa-pīš continued in this time.

== 19th century ==
Gilan was a major producer of silk beginning in the 15th century CE. As a result, it was one of the wealthiest provinces in Iran. Safavid annexation in the 16th century was at least partially motivated by this revenue stream. The silk trade, though not the production, was a monopoly of the Crown and the single most important source of trade revenue for the imperial treasury. As early as the 16th century and until the mid 19th century, Gilan was the major exporter of silk in Asia. The Shah farmed out this trade to Greek and Armenian merchants, and in return would receive a handsome portion of the proceeds.

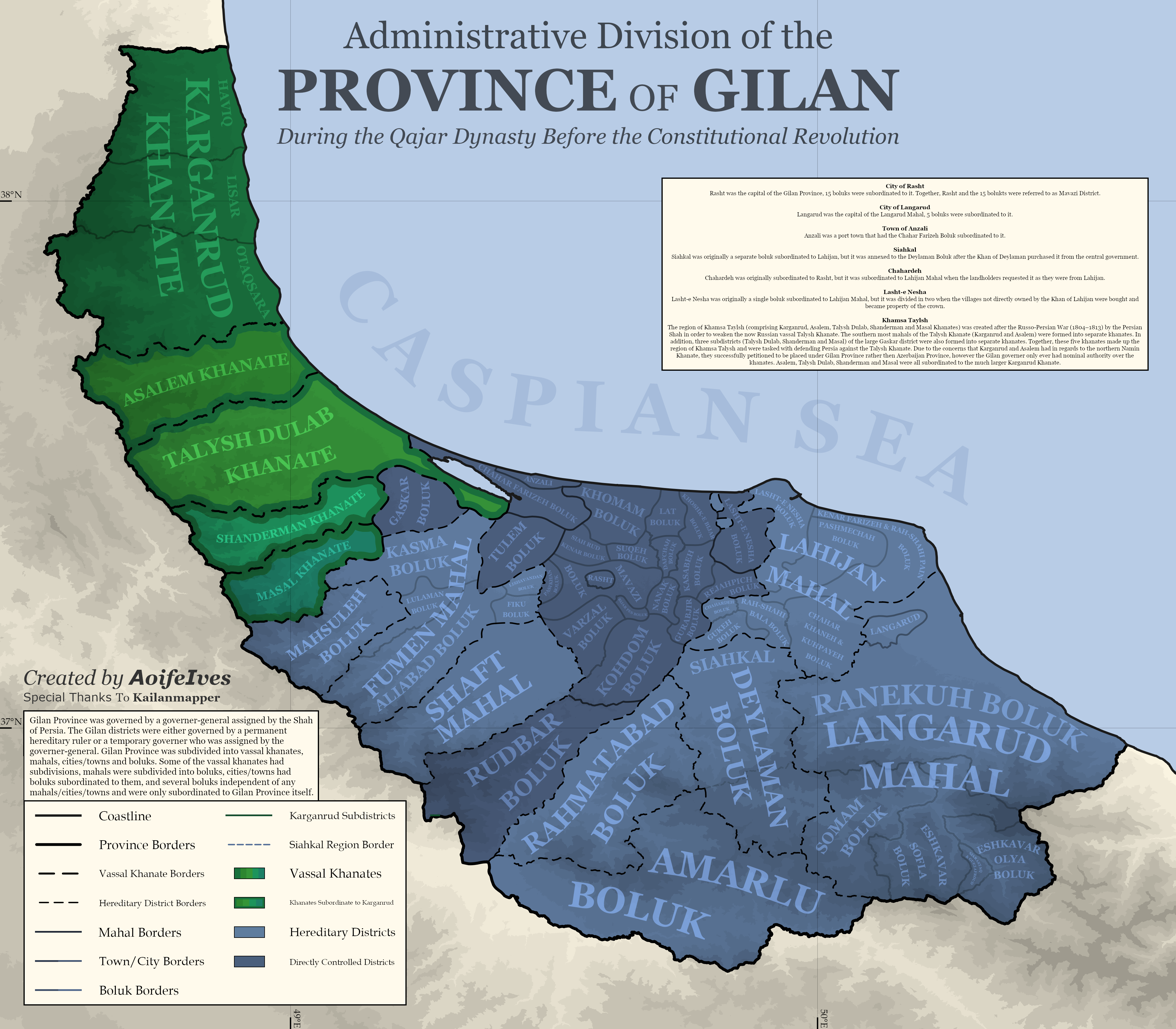
Map of the Province of Gilan in Qajar Iran.

In the mid 19th century, a widespread fatal epidemic among the silk worms paralyzed Gilan's economy, causing widespread economic distress. Gilan's budding industrialists and merchants were increasingly dissatisfied with the weak and ineffective rule of the Qajars. Re-orientation of Gilan's agriculture and industry from silk to production of rice and the introduction of tea plantations were a partial answer to the decline of silk in the province.

== 20th century ==
After World War I, Gilan came to be ruled independently of the central government of Tehran and concern arose that the province might permanently separate at some point. Prior to the war, Gilanis had played an important role in the Constitutional Revolution of Iran. Sepahdar-e Tonekaboni (Rashti) was a prominent figure in the early years of the revolution and was instrumental in defeating Mohammad Ali Shah Qajar.

In the late 1910s, many Gilakis gathered under the leadership of Mirza Kuchik Khan, who became the most prominent revolutionary leader in northern Iran in this period. Khan's movement, known as the Jangal movement of Gilan, had sent an armed brigade to Tehran which helped depose the Qajar ruler Mohammad Ali Shah Qajar. However, the revolution did not progress the way the constitutionalists had strived for, and Iran came to face much internal unrest and foreign intervention, particularly from the British and Russian Empires.

During and several years after the Bolshevik Revolution, the region saw another massive influx of Russian settlers (the so-called White émigrées). Many of the descendants of these refugees still linger forth in the region. During the same period, Anzali served as the main trading port between Iran and Europe.

The Jangalis are glorified in Iranian history and effectively secured Gilan and Mazandaran against foreign invasions. However, in 1920 British forces invaded Bandar-e Anzali, while being pursued by the Bolsheviks. In the midst of this conflict between Britain and Russia, the Jangalis entered into an alliance with the Bolsheviks against the British. This culminated in the establishment of the Persian Socialist Soviet Republic (commonly known as the Socialist Republic of Gilan), which lasted from June 1920 until September 1921.

In February 1921 the Soviets withdrew their support for the Jangali government of Gilan, and signed the Russo-Persian Treaty of Friendship (1921) with the central government of Tehran. The Jangalis continued to struggle against the central government until their final defeat in September 1921 when control of Gilan returned to Tehran.

== Russian occupations of Gilan ==
In 1722, Rasht was under siege by the Afghans. The new Safavid king Shah Ṭahmāsb II, dispatched a representative to sign treaty of alliance and protection with Russia. Accordingly, governor of Gilan requested the Russian czar, Peter the great for help. Peter sent two battalions of his regular soldiers under Colonel Shipov to Gilan. They were not welcomed by the government or the people and settled in a caravansary. Tahmasb's policy changed and requested their immediate withdrawal which they refused, so the governor sent 15,000 soldiers to them who were defeated with 1000 casualties. Then Peter sent four more battalions to Gilan. The representative, unaware of these developments signed a treaty which ceded to Russia Gīlān, Māzandarān, and Astarābād as well as Ṭāleš, Baku, and Derbent. The Russians left Gilan in 1734, returning all regions in the Caucasus and the Caspian sea region.

After the Qajars lost a series of wars to Russia (Russo-Persian Wars 1804–1813 and 1826–28), it resulted in an enormous gain of influence by the Russian Empire in the Caspian region, which would last all the way up to 1946.

During and several years after the Bolshevik Revolution, the region saw another massive influx of Russian settlers (the so-called White émigrées)]. Many of the descendants of these refugees still linger forth in the region. During the same period, Anzali served as the main trading port between Iran and Europe.

== Assimilated groups into the Gilaki people ==
In the Safavid, Afsharid, and Qajar eras Mazandaran was settled by Georgians, Circassians, Armenians and other Peoples of the Caucasus, whose descendants still live across Gilan.

== Bibliography ==
- Le Strange, Guy (1905). "Gilan and the North-West Provinces". The Lands of the Eastern Caliphate: Mesopotamia, Persia, and Central Asia, from the Moslem Conquest to the Time of Timur. Cambridge: Cambridge University Press. pp. 172ff.
- W. Barthold (1984). "Gilan and Mazandaran". An Historical Geography of Iran. Translated by Svat Soucek. Princeton University Press. pp. 230–242. ISBN 978-1-4008-5322-9.
