= Stor Bezashk =

Stōr-bizeshk were veterinarians within the Sassanid Persian army whose purpose was to ensure the safety and health of the steeds before battles. These men would care for the horses, feeding them and grooming them. According to some of the sources if the steeds would die in their care the stor bezashk would be fined. They also had thorough knowledge of herbs.

== See also ==
- Cataphract
- Sassanid army
- Spahbod
