= Gond-i Shahanshah =

Gond-i Shahanshah ("the army of the Shahanshah"), also known by its Arabicized form of Jund-i Shahanshah, was the name of the 4,000 Daylamite elite unit of the Sasanian king. They originally lived in Daylam, but were resettled in Ctesiphon by Khosrow II (r. 590-628), probably some time after 600. After the Sasanian Empire suffered a major defeat in 636 to the Arabs at the battle of al-Qadisiyyah, the Gond-i Shahanshah defected to the Arabs, converted to Islam, and settled in Kufa, where they had their own quarter.

== Sources ==
- Kennedy, Hugh (2007). The Great Arab Conquests: How the Spread of Islam Changed the World We Live In. Philadelphia, Pennsylvania: Da Capo Press. ISBN 978-0-306-81740-3.
- Zakeri, Mohsen (1995). Sāsānid Soldiers in Early Muslim Society: The Origins of ʿAyyārān and Futuwwa. Wiesbaden: Otto Harrassowitz. ISBN 978-3-447-03652-8.
