= Argbed =

Argbed (Middle Persian: hlgwpt; in Parthian: hrkpty Hargbed; etymology uncertain; in Roman sources: archapetēs) were a class of military commanders in charge of castles and fortresses of the Parthian and Sasanian Empires of Persia (Iran) between the 2nd and 7th centuries CE. The office became more important under the Sasanian Empire.

Argbeds were granted their command by the Sassanian emperor (Shahanshah) and were responsible for maintaining the security of their area of operation (usually a trading post, military fortress, or city), fighting the encroaching nomadic tribes such as Bedouin Arabs, White Huns and Oghuz Turks, and resisting the advances of settled enemies such as Romans and Kushans.

The Sasanian king usually selected Argbeds from wuzurgan, Iranian noble families who held the most powerful positions in the imperial administration. This rank, like most imperial administration, was mostly patrimonial, and was passed down through a single family for generations. In many ways, the Argbeds had the same function and status as medieval castellans.

== See also ==
- Spahbed
- Sassanid army
