= Theodore (nephew of Heraclius) =

Byzantine nobleman

- Born: Unknown
- Died: Unknown
- House: House of Heraclius
- Father: Theodore (brother of Heraclius)

Theodore (Greek: Θεόδωρος; Latin: Theodorus) was a Byzantine nobleman in the early 7th century. He was the son of Theodore, brother of the Byzantine Emperor Heraclius (r. 610–641).

In 635 or 637, some Armenian figures, at the time very influential in Constantinople, felt their interests would be better served under a new emperor. Their candidate to replace Heraclius was Athalarichos. Also involved were the curopalates Varaztirots, son of Smbat Bagratuni; David Saharuni, Athalarichos' cousin; and Heraclius' nephew, the magister Theodore. Varaztirots pushed for a bloodless coup, in which the emperor would be forced into exile.

The scheme was never executed, as an informer among the conspirators told the imperial court that Athalarichos was planning a coup attempt. Once Heraclius confirmed the story, he ordered the arrest of everyone involved. His advisers recommended the plotters be executed, but Heraclius was quoted by the historian Sebeos as saying, "Since you did as you did with regard to me and did not want to dip your hand into my blood and the blood of my sons, I shall not reach for you and your sons. Go where I order you, and I will have mercy upon you."

While he did spare their lives, Heraclius ordered the amputation of each plotter's nose and hands. In addition to being thus mutilated, Athalarichos was exiled to Prinkipo, one of the Princes' Islands. Theodore received the same treatment, but was sent to Gaudomelete (possibly modern day Gozo) with additional instructions to cut off one leg.

He was canonized as a (Latin: magister) by patriarch Nikephoros I of Constantinople r. 806–815, and Sebeos, who mistook him for a brother of John Athalaricos and a son of Heraclius, affirms that this title (referred to as its Greek variant magistro) is a surname. The authors of Prosopography of the Later Roman Empire assert that the way the title appears in the Breviarium of Nikephoros indicate that it is a honorific title, perhaps magister officiorum.

== Bibliography ==
- Charanis, Peter (1959). "Ethnic Changes in the Byzantine Empire in the Seventh Century". Dumbarton Oaks Papers. 13 (1). Trustees for Harvard University: 23–44. doi:10.2307/1291127. ISSN 0070-7546. JSTOR 1291127.
- Mango, Cyril (1990). Nikephoros, Patriarch of Constantinople: Short History. Washington: Dumbarton Oaks. ISBN 0-88402-184-X.
- Martindale, John R.; Jones, Arnold; Martin, Hugh; Morris, John (1992). The Prosopography of the Later Roman Empire - Volume III, AD 527–641. Cambridge and New York: Cambridge University Press. ISBN 0-521-20160-8.
