= John Athalarichos =

Son of Byzantine Emperor Heraclius

John Athalarichos (Greek: Ἰωάννης Ἀθαλάριχος; Latin: Ioannes Athalaricus), also spelled as Atalarichos, Athalaric, and At'alarik, was an illegitimate son of the 7th century Byzantine Emperor Heraclius. In 637 or 634, depending on the source, he was alleged to have taken part in a plot to overthrow Heraclius and seize the throne. His name, Athalarichos, is Gothic, composed of the elements Athala (from Proto-Germanic word *aþala meaning "noble") and richos (from *reiks meaning "ruler").

== Life ==
Athalarichos first appears in 622, when he was sent, along with Heraclius' nephew Stephen and John, the illegitimate son of the patrician Bonus, as a hostage to the Avars to cement a peace agreement.

In 635 or 637, some Armenian figures, at the time very influential in Constantinople, felt their interests would be better served under a new emperor. Their candidate to replace Heraclius was Athalarichos. Also involved were the curopalates Varaztirots, son of Smbat Bagratuni; David Saharuni, Athalarichos' cousin; and Heraclius' nephew, the magister Theodore. Varaztirots pushed for a bloodless coup, in which the emperor would be forced into exile.

The scheme was never executed, as an informer among the conspirators told the imperial court that Athalarichos was planning a coup attempt. Once Heraclius confirmed the story, he ordered the arrest of everyone involved. His advisers recommended the plotters be executed, but Heraclius was quoted by the historian Sebeos as saying, "Since you did as you did with regard to me and did not want to dip your hand into my blood and the blood of my sons, I shall not reach for you and your sons. Go where I order you, and I will have mercy upon you."

While he did spare their lives, Heraclius ordered the amputation of each plotter's nose and hands. In addition to being thus mutilated, Athalarichos was exiled to Prinkipo, one of the Princes' Islands. Theodore received the same treatment, but was sent to Gaudomelete (possibly modern day Gozo) with additional instructions to cut off one leg.

== Sources ==
- Charanis, Peter (1959), "Ethnic Changes in the Byzantine Empire in the Seventh Century", Dumbarton Oaks Papers, 13 (1), Trustees for Harvard University: 23–44, doi:10.2307/1291127, ISSN 0070-7546, JSTOR 1291127
- Kaegi, Walter Emil (27 March 2003), Heraclius: emperor of Byzantium (2003 ed.), Cambridge University Press, ISBN 0-521-81459-6
- Mango, Cyril, ed. (1990), Nikephoros, Patriarch of Constantinople: Short History (1990 ed.), Dumbarton Oaks, ISBN 0-88402-184-X
- Martindale, John R.; Jones, A.H.M.; Morris, John (1992), The Prosopography of the Later Roman Empire - Volume III, AD 527–641, Cambridge University Press, ISBN 0-521-20160-8
