= Hephthalite–Göktürk raids of 614–616 =

Military actions in Central Asia

Hephthalite–Gokturk raids of 614–616
Date	614–616
Location	Central Asia
Result	Sasanian victory

Belligerents
Sasanian Empire	Hephthalites; Western Turkic Khaganate

Commanders and leaders
Smbat IV Bagratuni; Datoyean	Anonymous leader †

Strength
	300,000 (exaggerated)

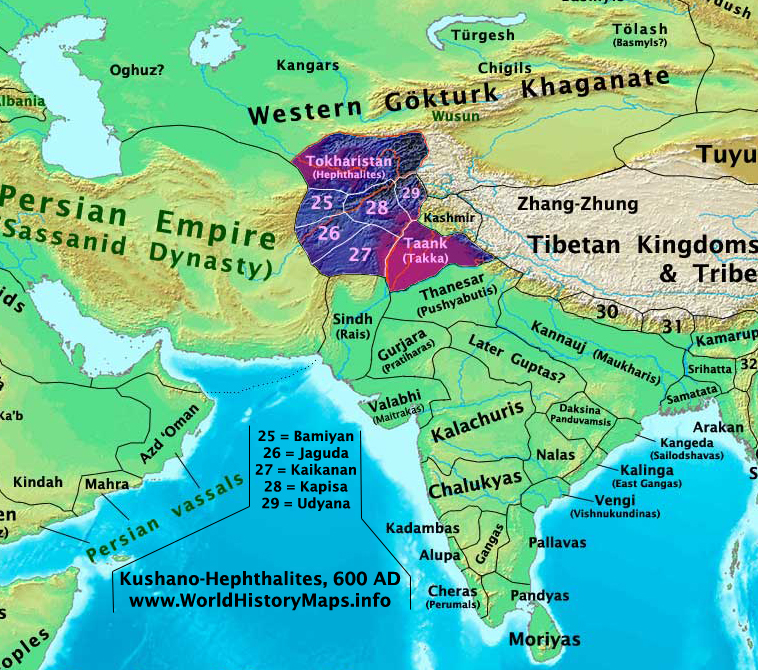
The Kushano-Hephthalite Kingdoms in 600 AD.

The Hephthalite–Gokturk raids of 614–616 were incursions by the Hephthalites and Gokturks into the Sasanian Empire. The Sasanian army led by Smbat Bagratuni quickly defeated the Hephthalites raid who, in response, called the Gokturk Empire for assistance. The Gokturks responded with a large army that raided as far as Ray and the province of Isfahan. The raid was defeated with Smbat killing the Hephthalites leader in single combat.

In 614 the Hephthalites raided eastern Persia with a large number of men, but were defeated in the first battle near the fort of Tus in Khorasan. (Note: Robert Haug states the battle was near Nishapur.) Having lost this battle, the Hephthalites requested reinforcements from the Khagan. According to Sebeos, 300,000 troops from the Gokturk empire were sent to reinforce the Hephthalites.

The Gokturk forces quickly overran Khorasan, but could not breach the fort of Tus with its 300 defenders. A Sasanian army under prince Datoyean arrived to meet the Gokturk army but was defeated. The Gokturks and Hepththalites, then raided as far as Ray and Isfahan. The Khagan gave the order for the Gokturks to retreat, leaving the Hepththalites on their own. Smbat quickly reorganized the eastern Persian forces and finally crushed the Hephthalites, reportedly killing their leader in hand-to-hand combat (mard o mard).

Following these noteworthy triumphs, Smbat was summoned back to the Persian court, where he died in 616 or 617.

== Sources ==
- Garsoian, Nina (2005). "SMBAT BAGRATUNI". Encyclopaedia Iranica.
- Haug, Robert (2019). The Eastern Frontier: Limits of Empire in Late Antique and Early Medieval Central Asia. I.B. Tauris.
- Pourshariati, Parvaneh (2008). Decline and Fall of the Sasanian Empire: The Sasanian-Parthian Confederacy and the Arab Conquest of Iran. London and New York: I.B. Tauris. ISBN 978-1-84511-645-3.
- Thomson, Robert (1999). Armenian History Attributed to Sebeos. Liverpool University Press.

== See also ==
- Perso-Turkic war of 588–589
- Perso-Turkic war of 627–629
