= David Saharuni =

7th-century Armenian official of the Byzantine Empire

David Saharuni (Armenian: Դաւիթ Սահառունի, Davit' Saharuni) was sparapet, curopalates, ishkhan, and presiding prince of Byzantine-controlled Armenia from 635 to 638. In an unprecedented move, his remit also included Byzantine-controlled Syria, which was likely driven by the efforts of the emperor Heraclius to attract Armenian military support against the advancing Muslim armies.

== Biography ==
David was a nakharar from the princely noble House of Saharuni. When the marzpan of Persarmania Varaztirots II Bagratuni was in the Byzantine imperial court in Osroene, he entered into a plot against emperor Heraclius organized by his illegitimate son John Athalarichos. David was also part of this plot. The attempt ultimately failed and Varaztirots was deported to an island near the coast of North Africa. David Saharuni was attacked by the general and ruler of Byzantine Armenia, Mzhezh Gnuni but managed to evade capture and killed Mzhezh Gnuni, with the help of Gnuni's own troops, many of whom were Armenians sympathetic to Saharuni.

David quickly obtained support from the local feudal lords, as a result, Heraclius was forced to nominate David as curopalates around 635. The historian John Katholikos adds that the Armenian nobles also gave him the title of Ishkhan of Armenia. He also founded the Cathedral of Mren in order to commemorate the return of the True Cross to Jerusalem. In 639, David undertook a counteroffensive against the Muslim invasion of Syria, but was beaten and retreated to Armenia. According to Dionysius of Tell Mahre, David was killed with many of his men, but Sebeos wrote that he was expelled by the nobility, though he does not mention that the defeat was the reason. After him, Theodoros Rshtuni took his place as ruler of Armenia. The most detailed source covering the events of these years is historian Sebeos in his History of Heraclius.

== Bibliography ==
- Avdoyan, Levon (19 April 2018). "David Saharuni". In Nicholson, Oliver (ed.). The Oxford Dictionary of Late Antiquity. Oxford University Press. ISBN 978-0-19-256246-3.
- Syvänne, Ilkka (29 December 2022). Military History of Late Rome 602–641. Pen and Sword Military. ISBN 978-1-3990-7570-1.
