= Heraclius =

Byzantine emperor from 610 to 641

- Basileus
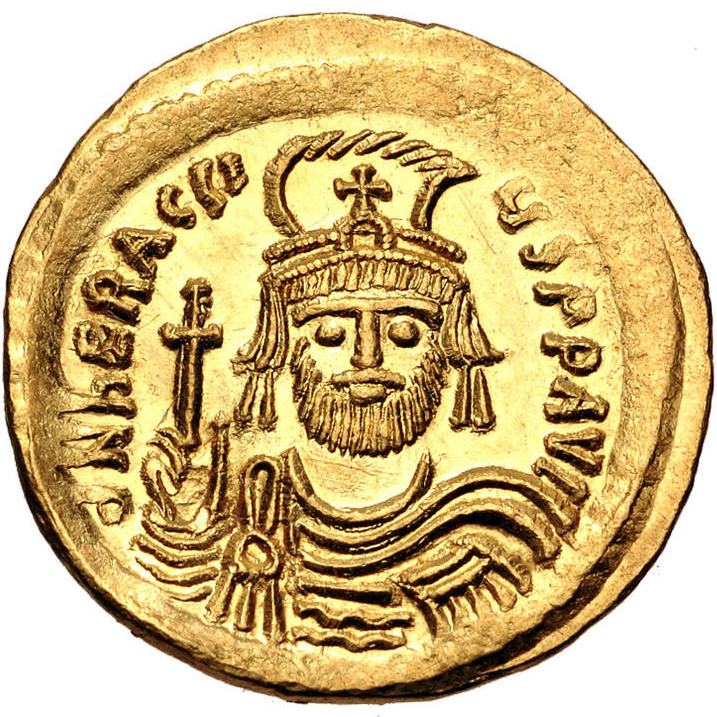
- Solidus of Heraclius, inscribed: d n heraclius pp aug, struck in Constantinople between 610 and 613

Byzantine emperor
- Reign: 5 October 610 – 11 February 641
- Predecessor: Phocas
- Successor: Heraclius Constantine; Heraclonas
- Co-emperors: Constantine (613–641); Heraclonas (638–641)
- Born: c. 575; Cappadocia, Byzantine Empire
- Died: 11 February 641 (aged 66); Constantinople, Byzantine Empire
- Spouse: Eudokia; Martina
- Issue more...: Eudoxia Epiphania; Heraclius Constantine; Heraclonas; David Tiberius; John Athalarichos (illegitimate)
Regnal name
- Latin: Imperator Caesar Flavius Heraclius Augustus; Greek: Αὐτοκράτωρ καῖσαρ Φλάβιος Ἡράκλειος αὐγουστος (Note: His full imperial titulature is attested in Greek as Αὐτοκράτωρ καῖσαρ φλάβιος ἡράκλειος πιστὸς ἐν χριστῷ ἡμερότατος μέγιστος εὐεργέτης εἰρηνικὸς ἀλαμαννικὸς γοτθικὸς φραγγικὸς γερμανικὸς ἀντικὸς ἀλανικὸς οὐανδαλικὸς ἀφρικανὸς ἐρουλικὸς γηπεδικὸς εὐσεβὴς εὐτυχὴς ἔνδοξος νικητὴς τροπαιοῦχος ἀεισέβαστος αὔγουστος ("Emperor Caesar Flavius Heraclius, faithful in Christ, most mild, greatest benefactor, peaceable; victor over the Alamanni, Goths, Franks, Germans, Antes, Alans, Vandals, Africans; pious, fortunate, renowned, victorious and triumphant, ever-venerable augustus"). Those exact victory titles were used by Justinian I and his successors.)
- Dynasty: Heraclian
- Father: Heraclius the Elder
- Mother: Epiphania
- Religion: Chalcedonian Christianity; Monothelitism

Heraclius (Greek: Ἡράκλειος, romanized: Hērákleios; c. 575 – 11 February 641) was Byzantine emperor from 610 to 641. His rise to power began in 608, when he and his father, Heraclius the Elder, the Exarch of Africa, led a revolt against the unpopular emperor Phocas.

Heraclius's reign was marked by wars against the Persians and the Arabs. Heraclius immediately took charge of the Byzantine–Sasanian War of 602–628 upon his accession, but his leadership initially did little to stem Persian ascendency in the war; after personally losing the Battle of Antioch (613), the Persians were able to take Syria and Egypt, reducing the Empire to Asia Minor. Heraclius, however, avoided total defeat and initiated reforms to rebuild and strengthen the military. Heraclius drove the Persians out of Asia Minor and pushed deep into their territory, defeating them in 627 at the Battle of Nineveh and devastating much of Mesopotamia. The Persian Shah Khosrow II was overthrown and executed by his son Kavad II, who soon sued for a peace treaty, agreeing to withdraw from all occupied territory. Heraclius won the war, but his Empire was deeply strained.

Heraclius soon lost many of his newly regained lands to the Rashidun Caliphate. Emerging from the Arabian Peninsula, the Arabs quickly conquered the Sasanian Empire. In 636, the Arabs marched into Syria, defeating Heraclius's brother Theodore. Within a short period of time, the Arabs conquered Mesopotamia, Armenia, and Egypt. Heraclius responded with reforms that allowed his successors to combat the Arabs and avoid total destruction.

Heraclius entered diplomatic relations with the Serbs in the Balkans. He tried to repair the schism in the Christian church regarding the non-Chalcedonians by promoting a compromise doctrine called monothelitism. The Church of the East (commonly called Nestorian) was also involved in the process. Eventually, this project of unity was rejected by all sides of the dispute. During his reign, the Greek language, widely spoken throughout the empire, became the official language of the state, replacing Latin.

== Origins and early life ==
The origin of Heraclius is a topic of debate among scholars, largely centered on his father's origins. He was the eldest son of Heraclius the Elder, who is considered of Armenian origin. (Note: His father is referred to retrospectively as Heraclius the Elder) Walter Kaegi considers Heraclius's Armenian origin "probable" and notes that Heraclius's mother, Epiphania, was probably of Cappadocian origin, which complicates the issue, since the term at the time could mean regions as far as Euphrates. Alexander Vasiliev also considers the Armenian origin probable based on the 7th century Armenian historian Sebeos, who claimed that Heraclius was related to the Arsacid dynasty of Armenia, but finds it contradictory to the assertion that Heraclius had "light golden hair". Elizabeth Redgate considers his Armenian origin likely. Anthony Kaldellis argues that there is no primary source that states that Heraclius [the Elder] was an Armenian and that the assertion is based on an erroneous reading of Theophylact Simocatta. In a letter, Priscus, a general who had replaced Heraclius the Elder, wrote to him "to leave the army and return to his own city in Armenia", which Kaldellis interprets as the command headquarters of Heraclius the Elder, and not his hometown. Beyond that, little is known about his origin. His father was a general in Emperor Maurice's war against the usurper Shah Bahram Chobin of the Sasanian Empire, in 590. After the war, Maurice appointed Heraclius the Elder to the position of Exarch of Africa.

There is little information about Heraclius's life prior to becoming an emperor. He had a reputation for a good education, but little was known about where and when he received it. Kaegi speculates that he was "bilingual (Armenian and Greek) from an early age, but even this is uncertain". Kaegi adds that Heraclius's military successes later in life likely drew on the experience of his father, whose earlier service provided insights in recruiting troops and taking strategic risks in difficult terrain. This knowledge is presumed to have been passed down orally over Heraclius’s early years rather than through written records.

== Revolt against Phocas and accession ==
In 608, Heraclius the Elder renounced his loyalty to the Emperor Phocas, who had overthrown Maurice six years earlier. Phocas was an unpopular ruler who was invariably described in historical sources as a "tyrant", an illegitimate king under the rules of succession. The rebels issued coins depicting both Heraclii dressed as hypatos, though neither explicitly claimed the imperial title at this time. Heraclius's younger cousin Nicetas launched an overland invasion of Egypt; by 609, he had defeated Phocas's general Bonosus and secured the province. Meanwhile, the younger Heraclius sailed eastward with another force via Sicily and Cyprus.

As he approached Constantinople, he made contact with prominent leaders and planned an attack to overthrow the aristocrats in the city. When he reached the capital, the Excubitors, an elite Imperial Guard unit led by Phocas's son-in-law Priscus, deserted to Heraclius, and he entered the city without serious resistance. When Heraclius captured Phocas, he asked him, "Is this how you have ruled, wretch?" Phocas's reply—"And will you rule better?"—so enraged Heraclius that he beheaded Phocas on the spot. (Note: The dialogue is reported by contemporary John of Antioch, but it is absent in Chronicon paschale where Phocas was executed by soldiers in the presence of Heraclius.) The genitalia were removed from the body because Phocas had raped the wife of Photius, a powerful politician in the city.

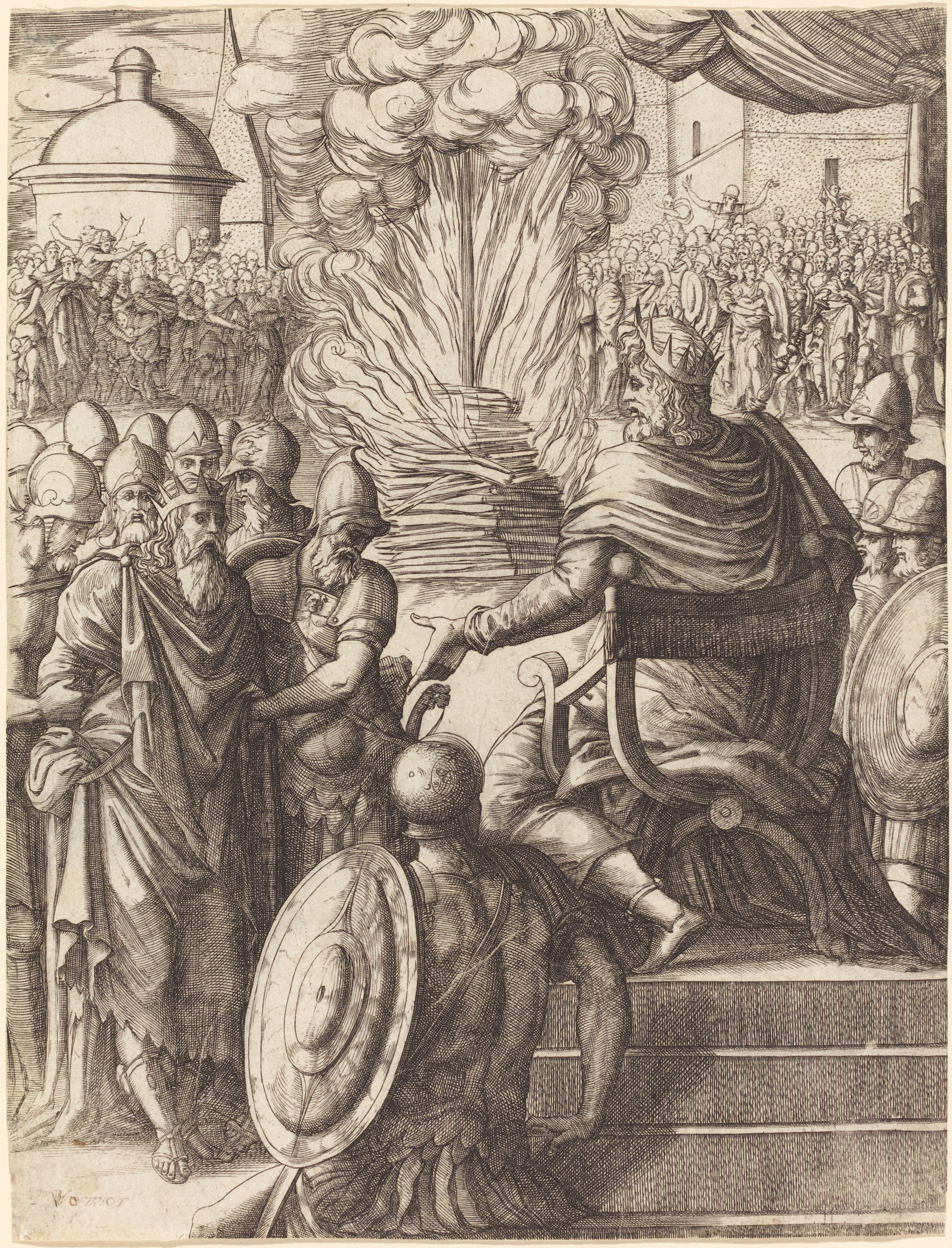
"Heraclius Sentencing the Tyrant Phocas", lithography in the National Gallery of Art

On 5 October 610, Heraclius was crowned in the Chapel of St. Stephen within the Great Palace.. Heraclius arrived on 3 October, a Saturday. However, the chronicle later states that he entered the city on 6 October, "a Monday". The 5th is clearly intended. He then married Fabia, who took the name Eudokia. After her death in 612, he married his niece Martina in 622 or 623, despite the scandalous reaction in both the ecclesiastical and secular sections of Byzantine society. The choice of marrying Martina was driven by the desire to address the legitimacy questions following Maurice's murder by consolidation of power aimed at establishing a family royal dynasty and a stable regency while being away on campaigns. However, the choice created new stability problems as his children were born with defects due to incestuous marriage and controversies from internal family tensions.

== Byzantine–Sasanian War of 602–628 ==
=== Persian advance ===
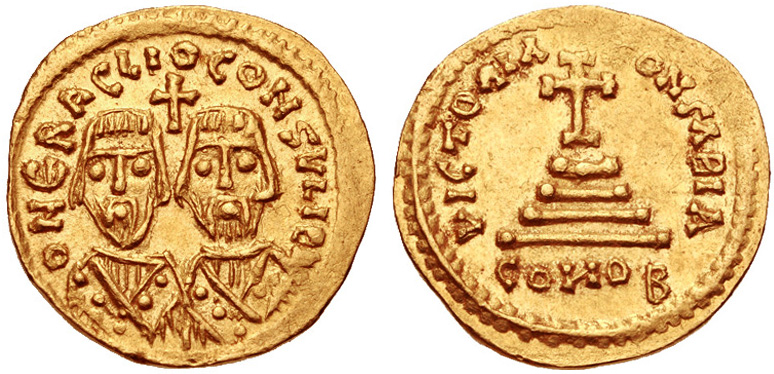
Gold solidus of Heraclius and his father in consular robes, struck during their revolt against Phocas

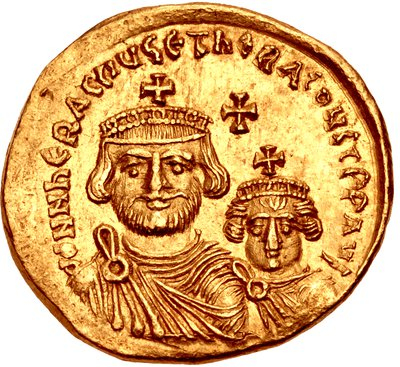
Heraclius in 613–616 (aged 38–41) with his son Heraclius Constantine

During his Balkan campaigns, Emperor Maurice and his family were murdered by Phocas in November 602 after a mutiny. The Persian King Khosrow II of the Sasanian Empire had been restored to his throne by Maurice, and they had remained allies until the latter's death. Thereafter, Khosrow seized the opportunity to attack the Byzantine Empire and reconquer Mesopotamia. The Persians attempted to claim that Maurice's son Theodosius had escaped to Persia, but in reality had perished in massacre of Maurice's family, and attempted to split with some success the Byzantines; some cities, such as Theodosiopolis, were persuaded by the impostor to surrender.

The war initially went the Persians' way, partly because of Phocas's brutal repression and the succession crisis that ensued as the general Heraclius sent his nephew Nicetas to attack Egypt, enabling his son Heraclius the younger to claim the throne in 610. By this time, the Persians had conquered Mesopotamia and the Caucasus, and in 611 they overran Syria and entered Anatolia. After gaining full personal control of the Byzantine armies, Heraclius led a counter-attack two years later to repel the Persian army. However, he was defeated near Antioch by Persian general Shahrbaraz and Shahin, resulting in the loss of Syria to the Persians. In the following years, the Persians devastated parts of Asia Minor and captured Chalcedon across from Constantinople on the Bosporus.

Over the following decade, the Persians were able to conquer Palestine and Egypt (by mid-621, the whole province was in their hands) and to devastate Anatolia, (Note: The mint of Nicomedia ceased operating in 613, and Rhodes fell to the invaders in 622/623.) while the Avars and Slavs took advantage of the situation to overrun the Balkans, however the extent of penetration and devastation is unknown. In 613, the Persian army took Damascus with the help of the Jews, seized Jerusalem in 614, damaging the Church of the Holy Sepulchre and capturing the True Cross, and afterwards capturing Egypt (618–622). The loss of Egypt significantly strained the budget of the Byzantine Empire.

When the Sasanians reached Chalcedon in 615, it was at this point, according to contemporary Sebeos, that Heraclius had agreed to stand down and was about ready to allow the Byzantine Empire to become a Persian client state, even permitting Khosrow II to choose the emperor. In a letter delivered by his ambassadors, Heraclius acknowledged the Persian empire as superior, described himself as Khosrow II's "obedient son, one who is eager to perform the services of your serenity in all things", and even called Khosrow II the "supreme emperor". Khosrow II nevertheless rejected the peace offer, and arrested Heraclius's ambassadors.

In 618, Heraclius considered abandoning Constantinople in favor of Carthage as the capital was exposed to threats from the Avars and Slavs in the north and the Persians from the east, but the Patriarch Sergius and the response by the citizens of Constantinople convinced him to stay. The loss of tax-rich provinces forced Heraclius to take drastic measures to raise the necessary funds to rebuild the army to reverse the Persian advances. Kaegi considers that Heraclius may have threatened to abandon the capital for Africa to persuade Sergius and the clergy to loan Church treasures (by melting down precious metals) to the state. Heraclius also drastically slashed non-military expenditure.

=== Byzantine counter-offensive and resurgence ===
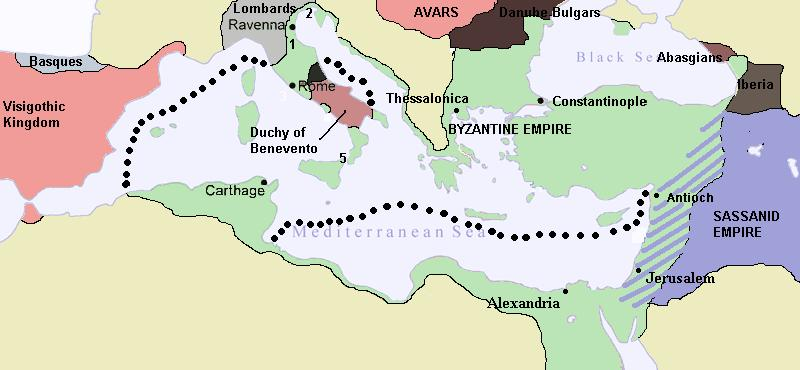
The Byzantine Empire in 629 after Heraclius had reconquered Syria, Palestine and Egypt from the Sassanid Empire.

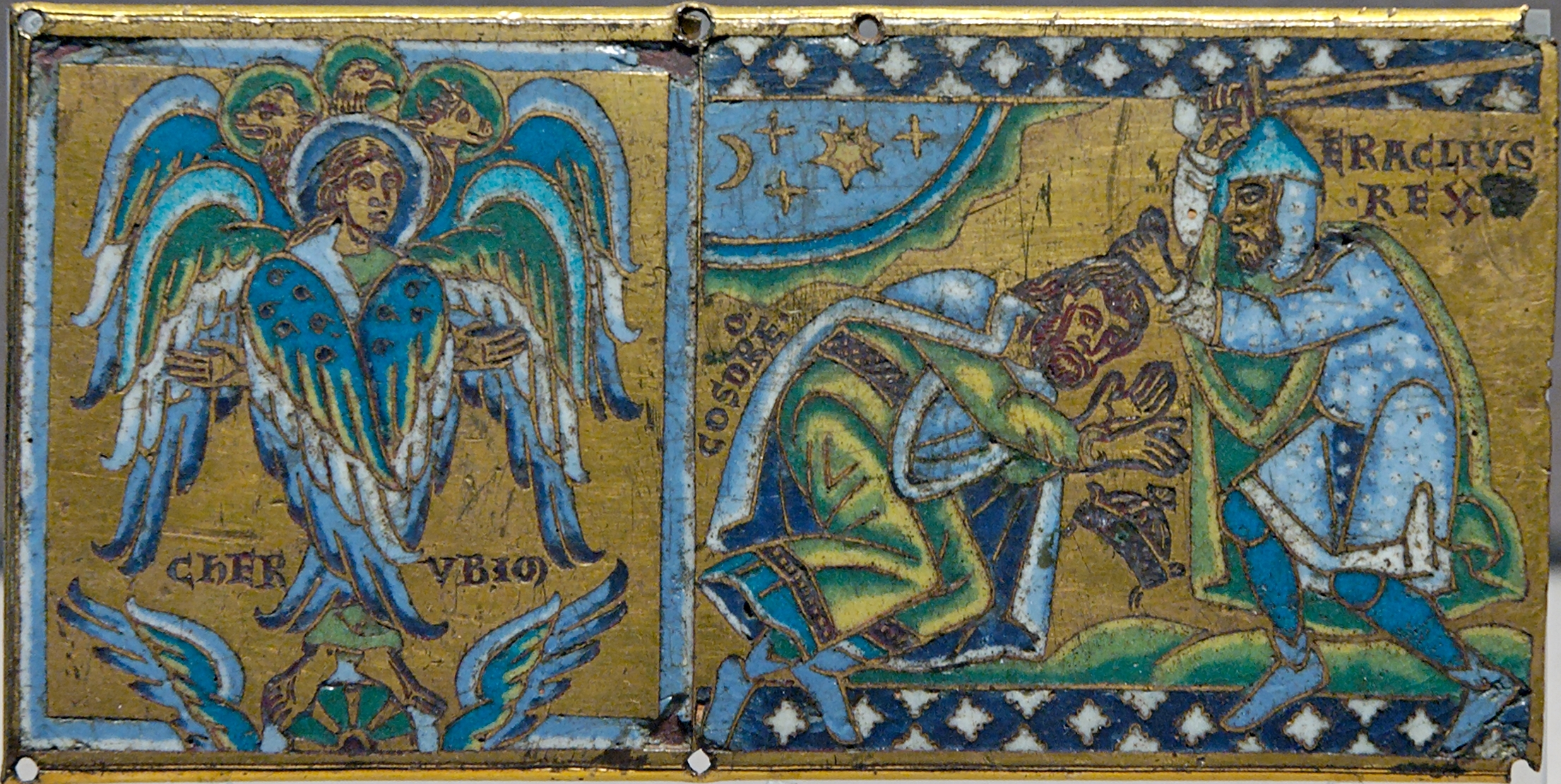
Cherub and Heraclius receiving the submission of Khosrow II; plaque from a cross (Champlevé enamel over gilt copper, 1160–1170, Louvre, Paris). This is an allegory as Khosrow never submitted in person.

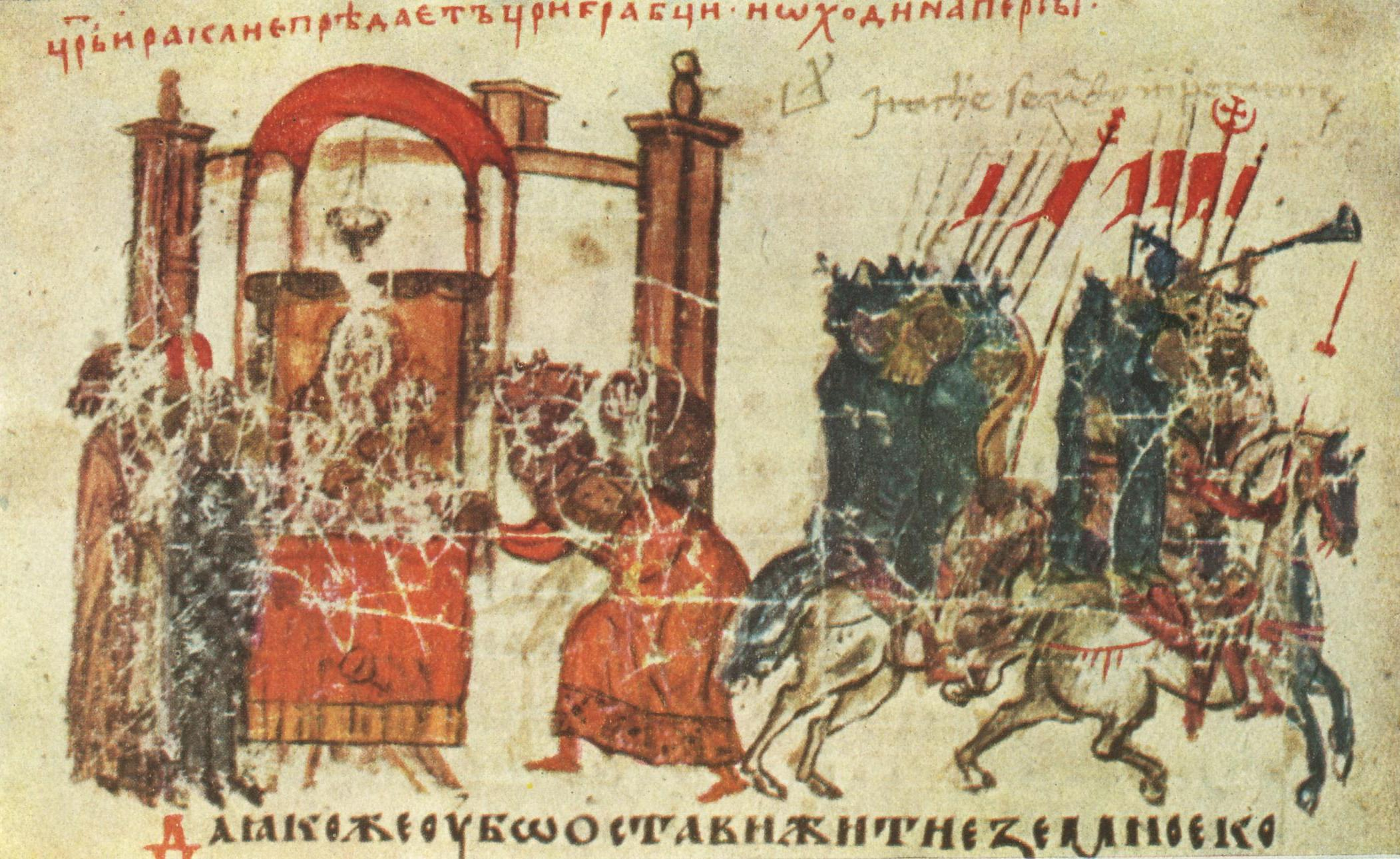
Heraclius (center) venerating the icon of Mary before campaigning against the Persians. Scene from the 12th century Manasses Chronicle.

On 4 April 622, Heraclius left Constantinople, entrusting the city to Sergius and general Bonus as regents of his son. He assembled his forces in Asia Minor, probably in Bithynia. He revived their broken morale with traditional Byzantine military drills, maneuvers, and formations. Additionally, Heraclius exposed the soldiers to the image of Christ, not made by human hand (acheiropoietos), as a military standard, and roused them with speeches by emphasizing the religious nature of the conflict against the Persians, who looted the Christian cities of the east. After this, he launched a new counter-offensive.

The Byzantine army proceeded to Armenia, inflicted a defeat on an army led by a Persian-allied Arab chief, and then won a victory over the Persians under Shahrbaraz. Heraclius would stay on campaign for several years. On 25 March 624, he again left Constantinople with Martina and his two children; after he celebrated Easter in Nicomedia on 15 April, he campaigned in the Caucasus, winning a series of victories against Khosrow and his generals Shahrbaraz, Shahin, and Shahraplakan. In the same year the Visigoths succeeded in recapturing Cartagena, capital of the western Byzantine province of Spania, resulting in the loss of one of the provinces that had been conquered by the armies of Justinian I. In 626 the Avars and Slavs supported by a Persian army commanded by Shahrbaraz, besieged Constantinople, but the siege ended in failure (the victory was attributed to the icons of the Virgin which were led in procession by Sergius about the walls of the city), while a second Persian army under Shahin suffered another defeat at the battle of the Lycus against Heraclius's brother Theodore in mid-summer 626. Heraclius himself may also have been present in this encounter.

With the Persian war effort disintegrating, Heraclius was able to bring in the Gokturks of the Western Turkic Khaganate, under Ziebel, who invaded Persian Transcaucasia. Heraclius exploited divisions within the Persian Empire, keeping Shahrbaraz neutral by convincing him that Khosrow had grown jealous of him and had ordered his execution. Late in 627, he launched a winter offensive into Mesopotamia, where, despite the desertion of his Turkish allies, he defeated the Persians under Rhahzadh at the Battle of Nineveh. Continuing south along the Tigris, he sacked Khosrow's great palace at Dastagird and was only prevented from attacking Ctesiphon by the destruction of the bridges on the Nahrawan Canal. Discredited by this series of disasters, Khosrow was overthrown and killed in a coup led by his son Kavad II, who at once sued for peace, agreeing to withdraw from all occupied territories. In 629 Heraclius restored the True Cross to Jerusalem.

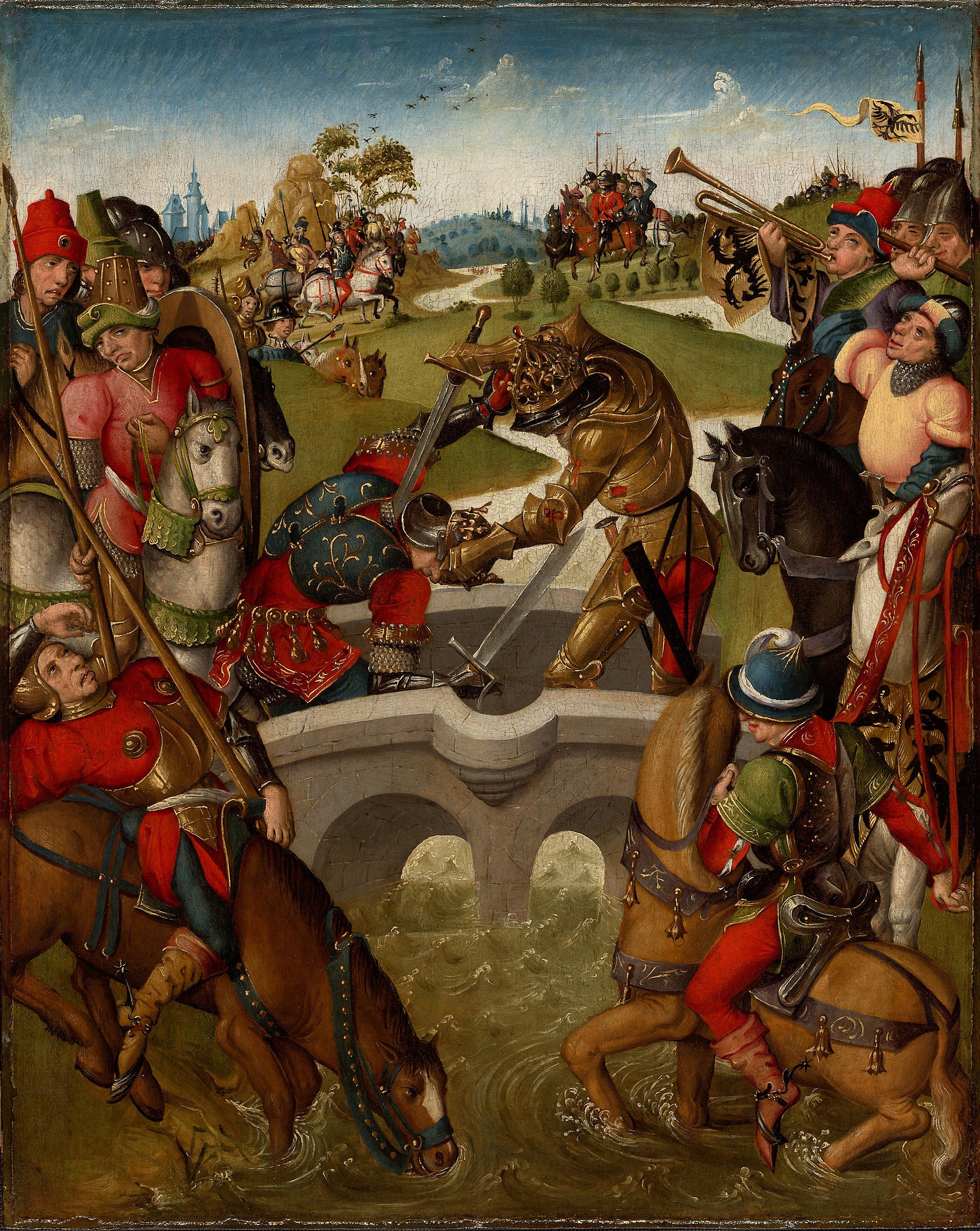
"Emperor Heraclius Slays the King of Persia", painted between 1485 and 1495, Art Institute of Chicago

Heraclius's defeat of the Persians ended a war that had been going on intermittently for almost 400 years and led to instability in the Persian Empire. Kavad II died only months after assuming the throne, plunging Persia into several years of dynastic turmoil and civil war. Ardashir III, Heraclius's ally Shahrbaraz, and Khosrow's daughters Boran and Azarmidokht all succeeded to the throne within months of each other. Only when Yazdegerd III, a grandson of Khosrow II, succeeded to the throne in 632, was there stability. But by then the Sasanid Empire was severely disorganised, having been weakened by years of war and civil strife over the succession to the throne. The war had been devastating, leaving the Byzantines in a much weaker state. Within a few years both empires were overwhelmed by the onslaught of the Arabs, ultimately leading to the Arab conquest of Persia and the fall of the Sasanian dynasty in 651.

== Byzantine–Arab wars ==
Territorial extent of the Arab conquests: Expansion under Muhammad, 622–632 Expansion during the Rashidun Caliphate, 632–661 Expansion during the Umayyad Caliphate, 661–750

By 630, the Arabs had unified all the tribes of the Hijaz, which had previously been too divided to pose a serious military challenge to the Byzantines or the Persians. They composed one of the most powerful states in the region. The first conflict between the Byzantines and the Arabs was the Battle of Mu'tah in September 629. A small Arabs skirmishing force attacked the province of Arabia in response to the Arab ambassador's death at the hands of the Ghassanid Byzantine governor, but were repulsed. Since the engagement was a Byzantine victory, there was no apparent reason to change the region's military organization. The Byzantine military was not accustomed to fighting Arab armies at scale, much like the Islamic forces of Hijaz, who had no prior experience in their engagements against the Byzantines. Even the Strategicon of Maurice, a manual of war praised for the variety of enemies it covers, does not mention warfare against Arabs at any length. The religious zeal of the Arab army, which was a recent development following the rise of Islam, ultimately contributed to the latter's success in its campaigns against the Byzantines.

The following year, the Arabs launched an offensive into the Arabah south of Lake Tiberias, taking al-Karak. Other raids penetrated the Negev, reaching as far as Gaza. The Battle of Yarmouk in 636 resulted in a crushing defeat for the larger Byzantine army; within three years, the Levant had been lost again. Heraclius died of an illness on 11 February 641, aged sixty-six. (Note: This is the date as given by the calculations of Nikephoros I of Constantinople (758–828): "So he died of this (disease) at the age of sixty-six after a reign of thirty years, four months, and six days".) Other authors give only the month of his death. The 13th-century Chronicon Altinate gives 11 January, probably a mistake given the many corrupted dates in the text. Most of Egypt had fallen by that time.

== Legacy ==
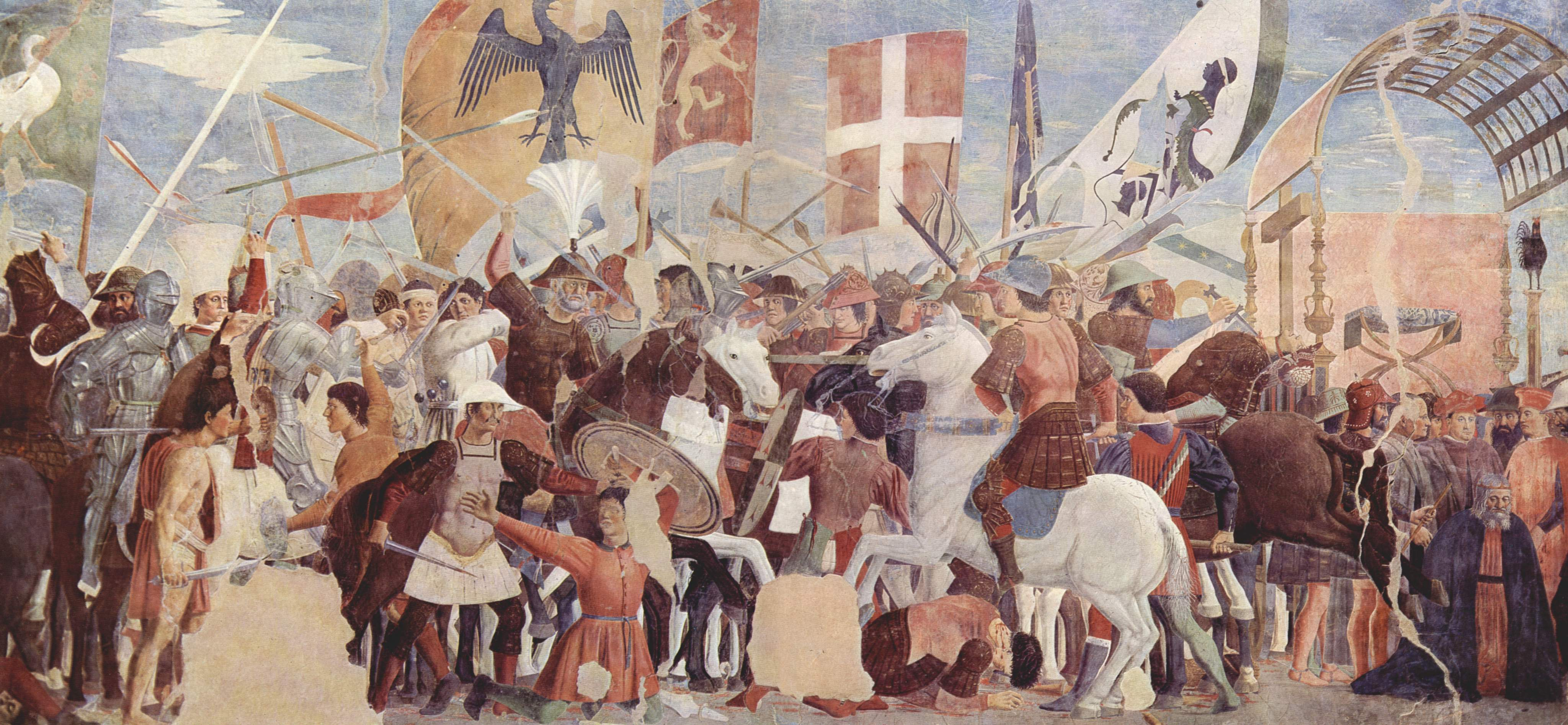
Battle between Heraclius's army and Persians under Khosrow II. Fresco by Piero della Francesca, c. 1452

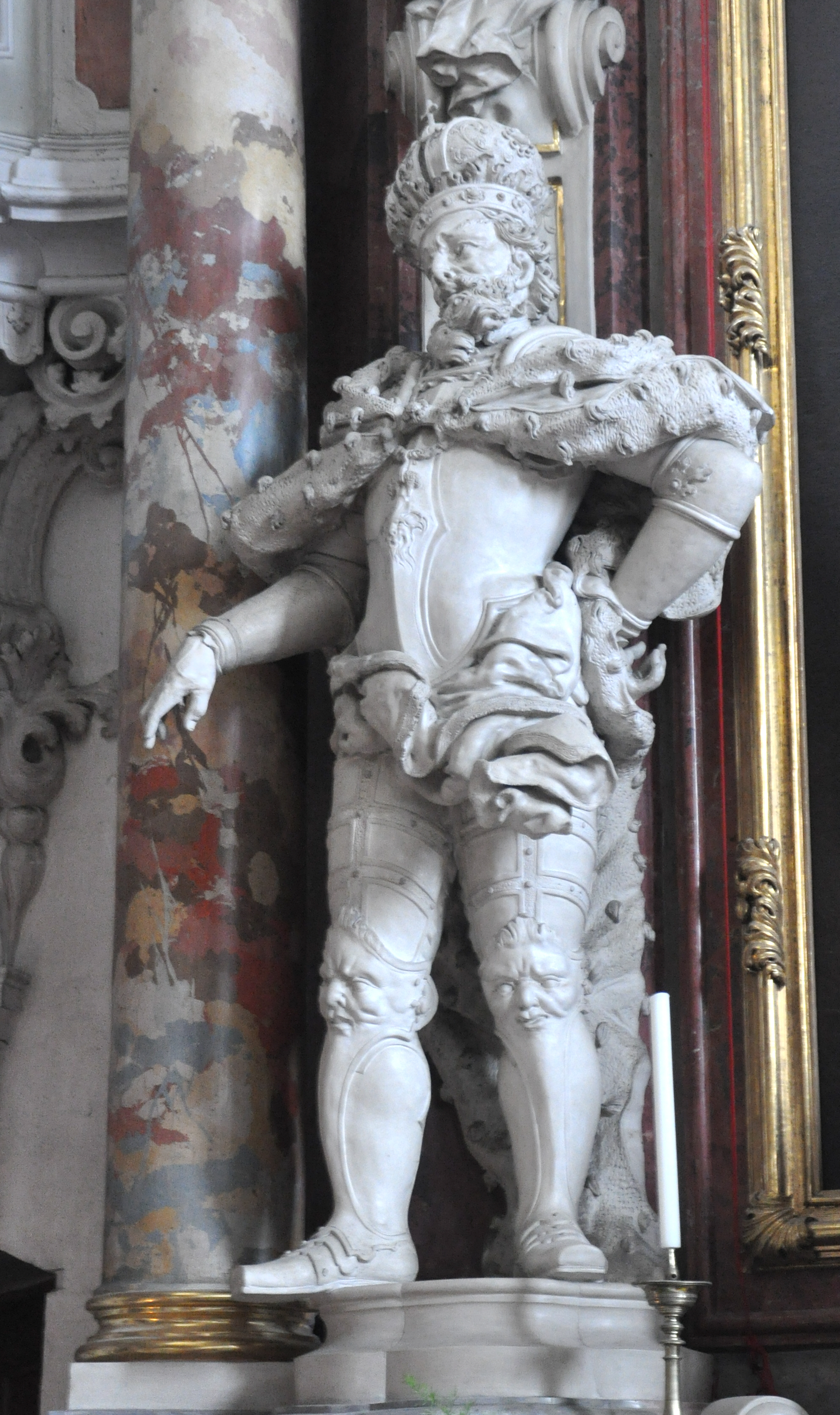
Baroque sculpture of Heraclius in the Metten Abbey, created by Franz Josef Holzinger between 1724 and 1772

An early view of Heraclius's legacy is presented by 18th-century historian Edward Gibbon in The History of the Decline and Fall of the Roman Empire,

Of the characters conspicuous in history, that of Heraclius is one of the most extraordinary and inconsistent. In the first and last years of a long reign, the emperor appears to be the slave of sloth, of pleasure, or of superstition, the careless and impotent spectator of the public calamities. But the languid mists of the morning and evening are separated by the brightness of the meridian sun; the Arcadius of the palace arose the Caesar of the camp; and the honor of Rome and Heraclius was gloriously retrieved by the exploits and trophies of six adventurous campaigns. [...] Since the days of Scipio and Hannibal, no bolder enterprise has been attempted than that which Heraclius achieved for the deliverance of the empire.

However, modern historians have a more grounded assessment. Warren Treadgold commends Heraclius' success against the Persians, and although the empire suffered setbacks from the Arab invasion, Heraclius was still able to preserve the Byzantine Empire, unlike his contemporary Yazdegerd III. Treadgold argues that Heraclius' performance against the Arabs was respectable. Kaegi notes that despite the military talents of Heraclius, such as his ability to take advantage of choke points in Anatolia to reverse the advance of the Persian armies, he failed to conserve Roman elements of the empire, becoming more Middle Eastern.

The territories recovered by his defeat of the Persians were relinquished again in the Arab conquests. The recovery of the eastern areas of the Byzantine Empire from the Persians once again raised the problem of religious unity, centering on the understanding of the true nature of Christ. Most of the inhabitants of these provinces were Miaphysites (Christ's divine and human natures are the same), who rejected the Council of Chalcedon (Christ's divine and human natures are separate). Heraclius promoted, through the publication of Ecthesis, a compromise doctrine called Monothelitism (two natures but a single will), which initially appeared to gain acceptance and gave hope in healing the fragmented theological unity. However, Pope Honorius I had died in 638, and his successor Pope Severinus condemned Heraclius's proposal outright and so was forbidden his seat until 640. His successor, Pope John IV (640–642), also rejected the doctrine completely, leading to a major schism between the eastern and western halves of the Chalcedonian Church. When news reached Heraclius of the Pope's condemnation, he was already old and ill, and the news only hastened his death. He declared with his dying breath that the controversy was all due to Sergius and that the patriarch had pressured him to give his unwilling approval to the Ecthesis.

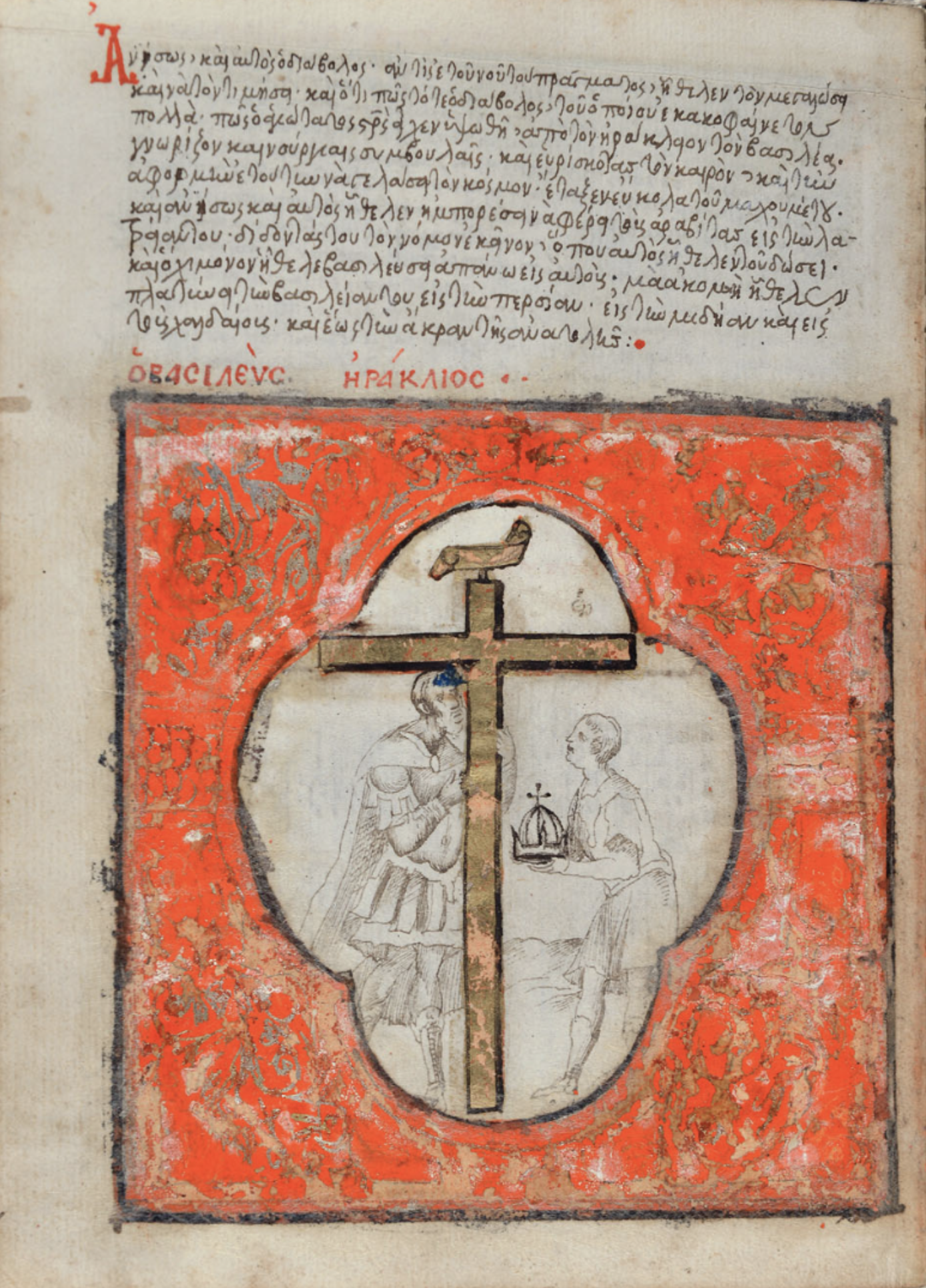
"The King Heraclius", from the 11th century Apocalypse of Pseudo-Methodius

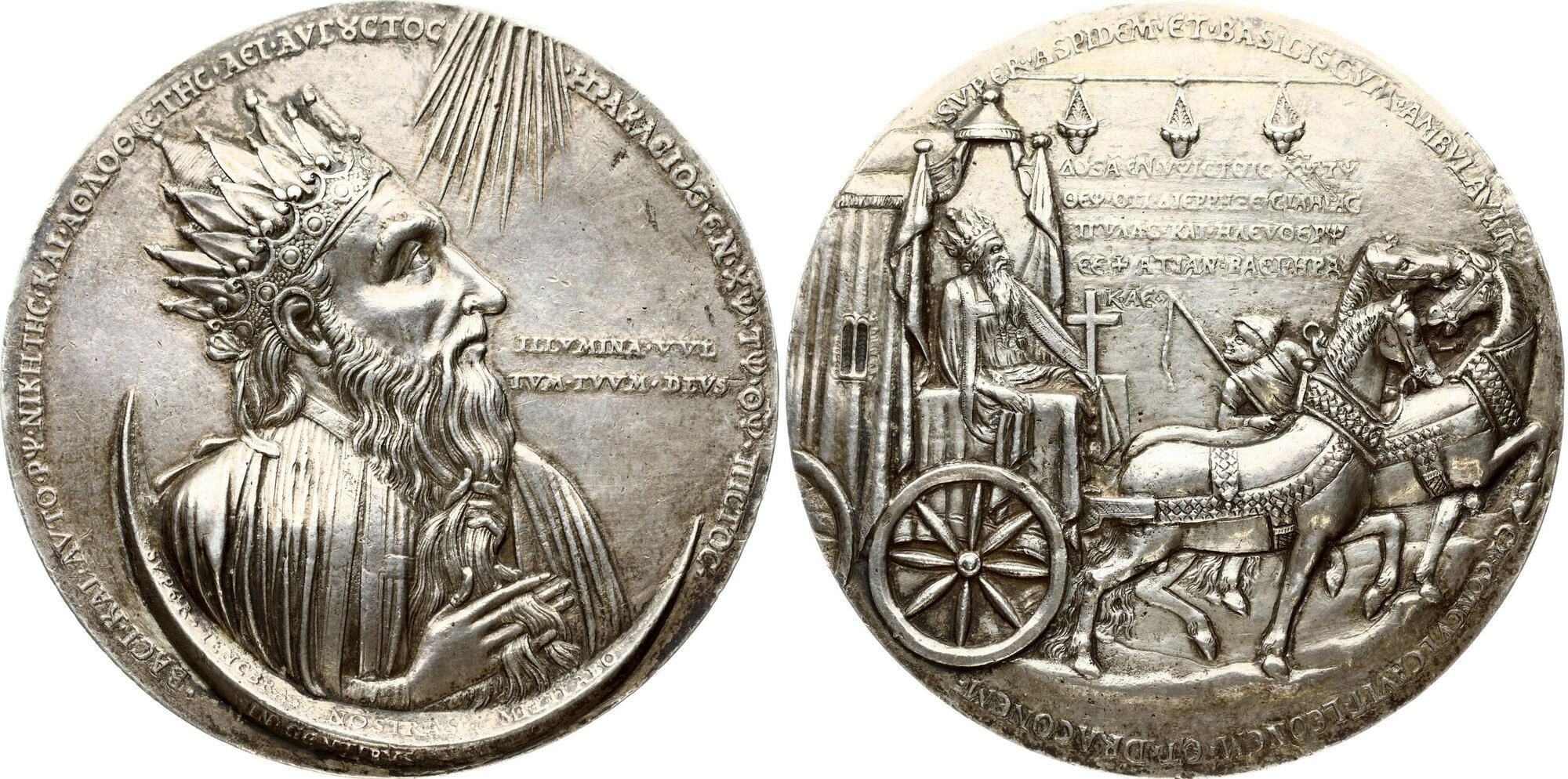
French 19th century silver two-side replica of an early 15th century medal in memory of Heraclius

Heraclius is also attributed to changes in the structure of Byzantine administration. According to Leo Donald Davis and Romilly James Heald Jenkins, one of the legacies of Heraclius was changing the official language of the Empire from Latin to Greek; no formal law is recorded but the usage of Greek was widespread throughout the empire. (Note: Han Lamers, professor of classical philology at the University of Oslo, states, "Emperor Heraclius (r. 610–41) who introduced Greek as the official language of the Roman Empire".) (Note: Eugenia Russell, Lecturer in History at St Mary's University, Twickenham, states it was "on the initiative of Hercaclius, Greek was replacing Latin as the official language of the Eastern Roman Empire.") Heraclius took for himself the ancient Persian title of "King of Kings" after his victory. Later on, starting in 629, he styled himself as Basileus, the Greek word for "sovereign", and that title was used by the Byzantine emperors for the next 824 years. The reason Heraclius chose this title over previous Byzantine terms such as Augustus has been attributed by some scholars to his Armenian origins. Up to the 20th century, he was credited with establishing the Thematic system, but modern scholarship now points more to the 660s, under Constans II.

The Croats and Serbs of Byzantine Dalmatia initiated diplomatic relations and dependencies with Heraclius. The Serbs, who briefly lived in Macedonia, became foederati and were baptized at the request of Heraclius (before 626). At his request, Pope John IV sent Christian teachers and missionaries to Duke Porga and his Croats, who practiced Slavic paganism.

=== Recovery of the True Cross ===
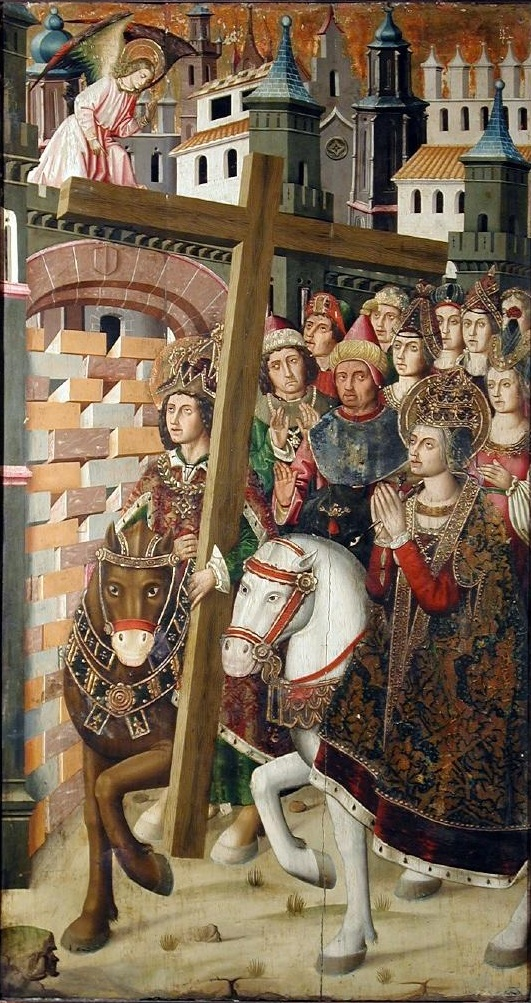
Heraclius returns the True Cross to Jerusalem, anachronistically accompanied by Saint Helena. 15th century, Spain

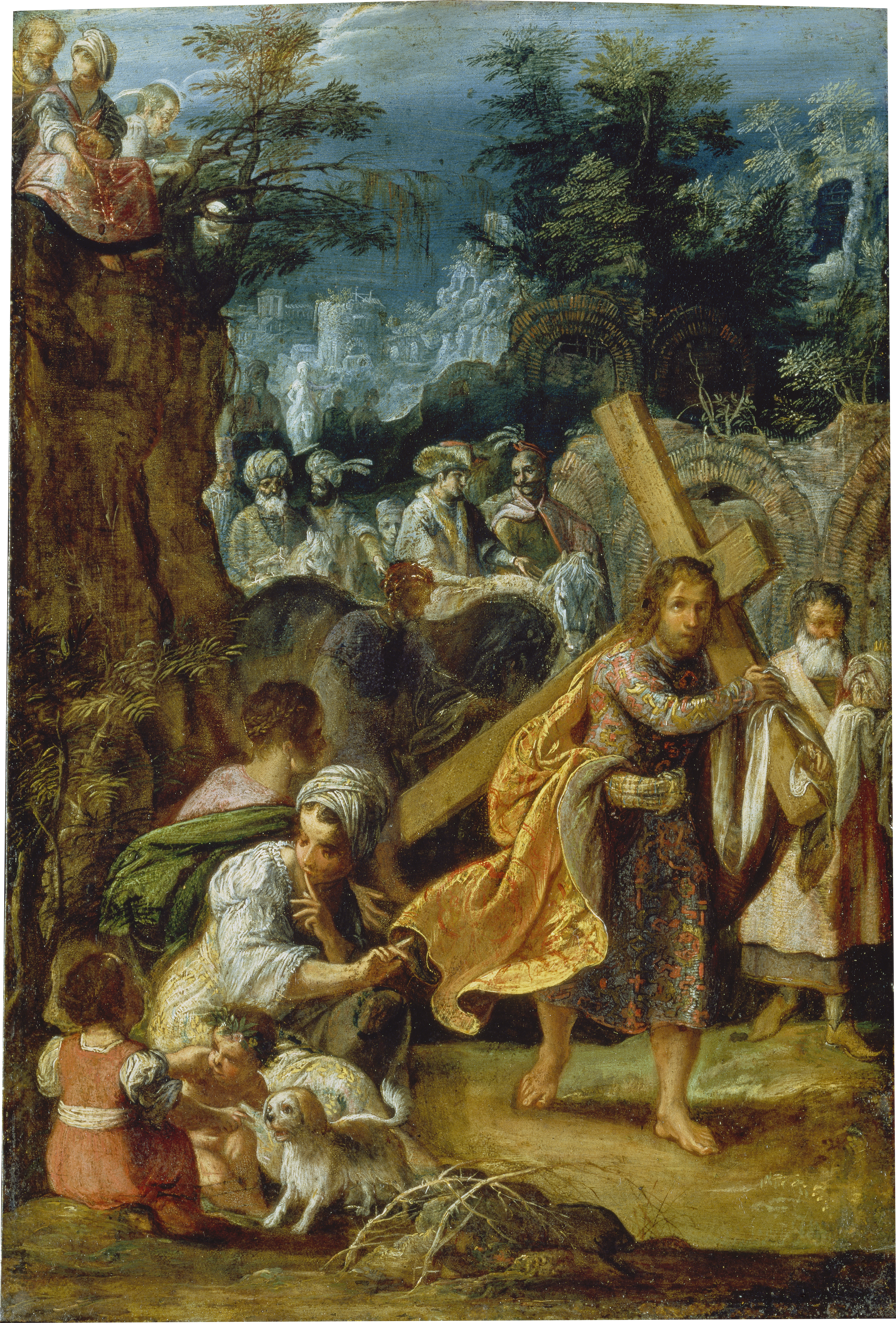
"Emperor Heraclius' Entry into Jerusalem", painted by Adam Elsheimer in 1604

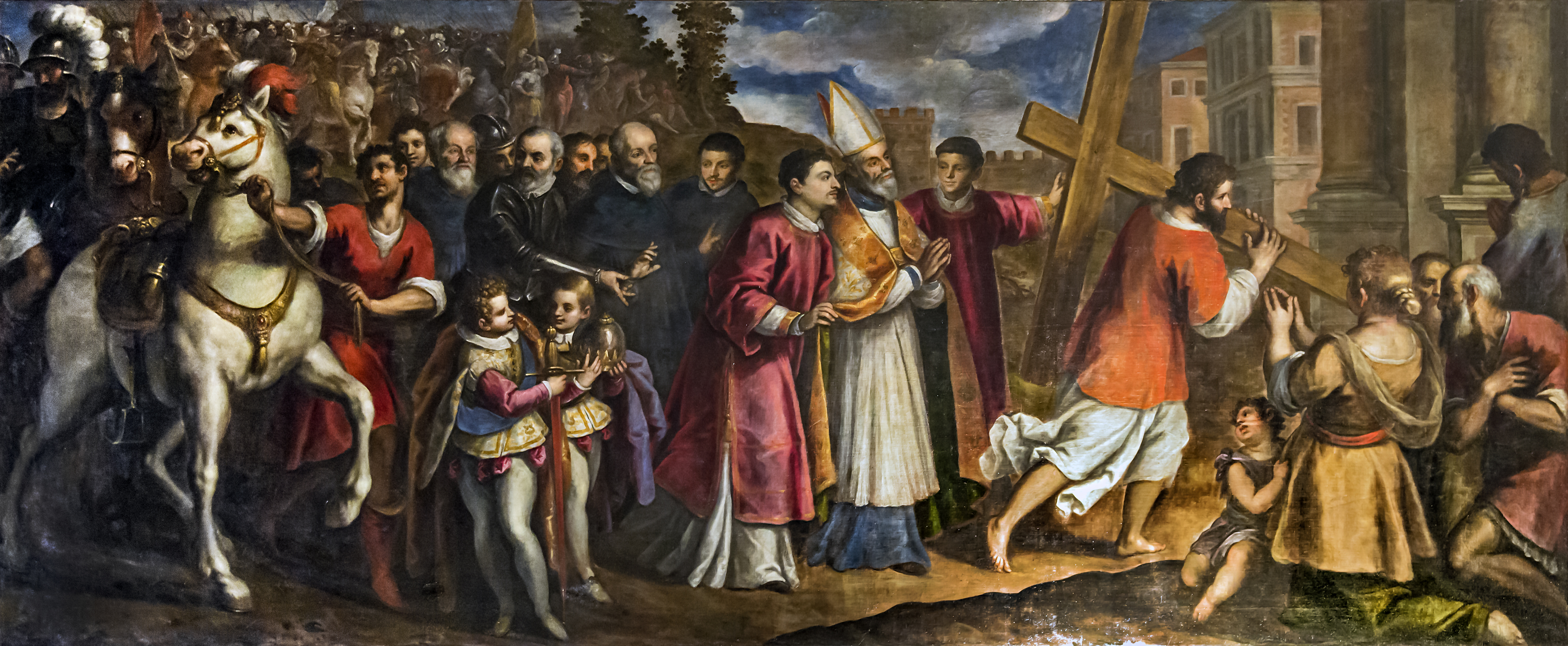
"Emperor Heraclius carries the Holy Cross on his shoulders in Jerusalem", painted by Palma il Giovane between 1620 and 1625, I Gesuiti, Venice

Heraclius was long remembered favorably by the Western church for his reputed recovery of the True Cross from the Persians. As Heraclius approached the Persian capital during the final stages of the war, Khosrow fled from his favorite residence—Dastagird near Baghdad—without offering resistance. Meanwhile, some of the Persian grandees freed Khosrow's eldest son Kavad II, who had been imprisoned by his father, and proclaimed him King on the night of 23–24 February, 628. Kavad, however, was mortally ill and was anxious that Heraclius should protect his infant son Ardeshir. So, as a goodwill gesture, he sent the True Cross with a negotiator in 628.

After a tour of the Empire, Heraclius returned the cross to Jerusalem on 21 March 629 or 630. For Christians of Western Medieval Europe, Heraclius was the "first crusader". The iconography of the emperor appeared in the sanctuary at Mont Saint-Michel (c. 1060), and then it became popular, especially in France, the Italian Peninsula, and the Holy Roman Empire. The story was included in the Golden Legend, the famous 13th-century compendium of hagiography, and he is sometimes shown in art, as in The History of the True Cross sequence of frescoes painted by Piero della Francesca in Arezzo, and a similar sequence on a small altarpiece by Adam Elsheimer (Städel, Frankfurt). Both of these show scenes of Heraclius and Constantine I's mother Saint Helena, traditionally responsible for the excavation of the cross. The scene usually shown is Heraclius carrying the cross; according to the Golden Legend, he insisted on doing this as he entered Jerusalem, against the advice of the Patriarch. At first, when he was on horseback (shown above), the burden was too heavy, but after he dismounted and removed his crown, it became miraculously light, and the barred city gate opened of its own accord.

Some scholars disagree with the return of the cross narrative, Professor Constantin Zuckerman going as far as to suggest that the True Cross was actually lost, and that the wood contained in the allegedly still-sealed reliquary brought to Jerusalem by Heraclius in 629 was a fake. In his analysis, the hoax was designed to serve the political purposes of both Heraclius and his former foe, Shahrbaraz.

=== Islamic view of Heraclius ===
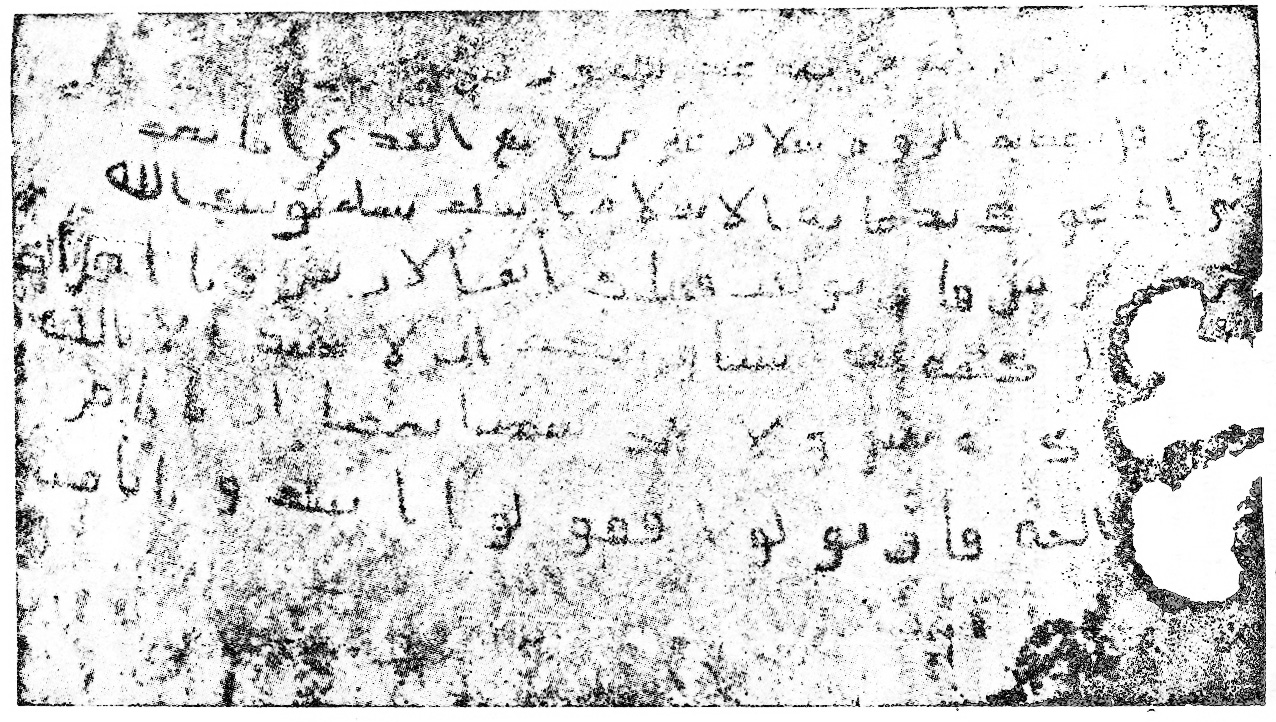
Purported letter sent by Muhammad to Emperor Heraclius; reproduction taken from Majid Ali Khan, Muhammad The Final Messenger Islamic Book Service, New Delhi (1998).

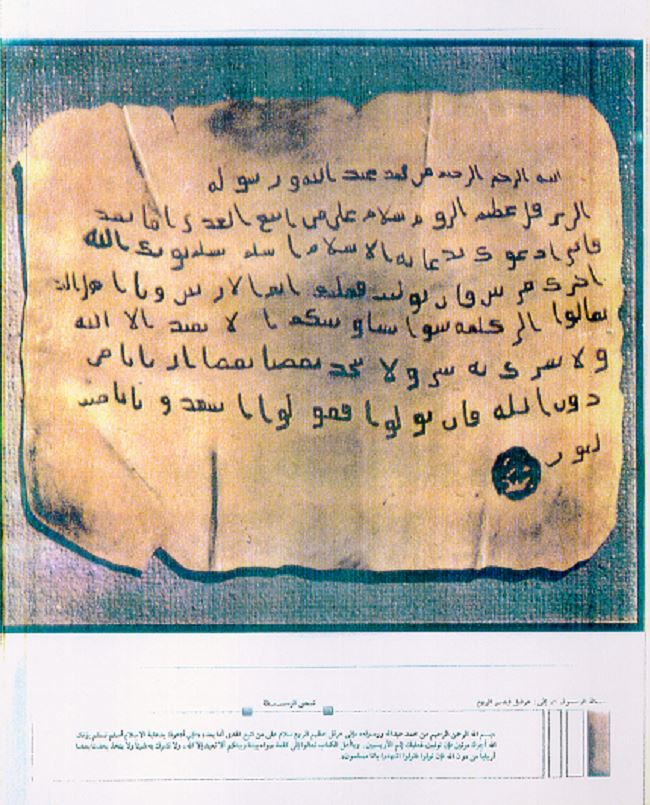
Purported letter sent by Muhammad to Heraclius, emperor of Byzantium; original version of the letter.

Heraclius is discussed in early Islamic and Arab histories because he ruled Byzantium when Islam first emerged. Specifically, in Arabic literature he appears in hadith and sira. In the third and fourth verses, his victory against the Sassanid Empire was prophesied, and the Muslim community is promised that the Byzantines will retake Jerusalem "in a few years' time". Medieval scholar Ibn Kathir (c. 1300 – c. 1373) portrayed him as a wise and pious ruler.

Islamic tradition also reports that Muhammad sent a letter inviting Heraclius to accept Islam as the true faith and Muhammad as its prophet, by comparing Islam to Christianity. The letter urged him to submit to God and warned that rejecting the message would bring responsibility for the sins of his subjects. According to Muslim sources, Heraclius treated the envoy respectfully, inquired about Muhammad, and reportedly found the prophetic claim plausible, though he ultimately did not convert after opposition from his court.

However, many modern historians view these stories as part of the Islamic religious tradition rather than verifiable history. El-Cheikh notes that these accounts of Heraclius add "little to our historical knowledge" of the emperor; rather, they are an important part of "Islamic kerygma," attempting to legitimize Muhammad's status as a prophet. Most Western academic historians view such traditions as biased and proclamatory and of little historical value. According to Kaegi, any messengers sent by Muhammad to Heraclius would not have received an imperial audience or recognition. Adding that there is no evidence outside of Islamic sources to suggest Heraclius ever heard of Islam, and it is possible that he and his advisors actually viewed the Muslims as some special sect of Jews.

== Family and personal life ==
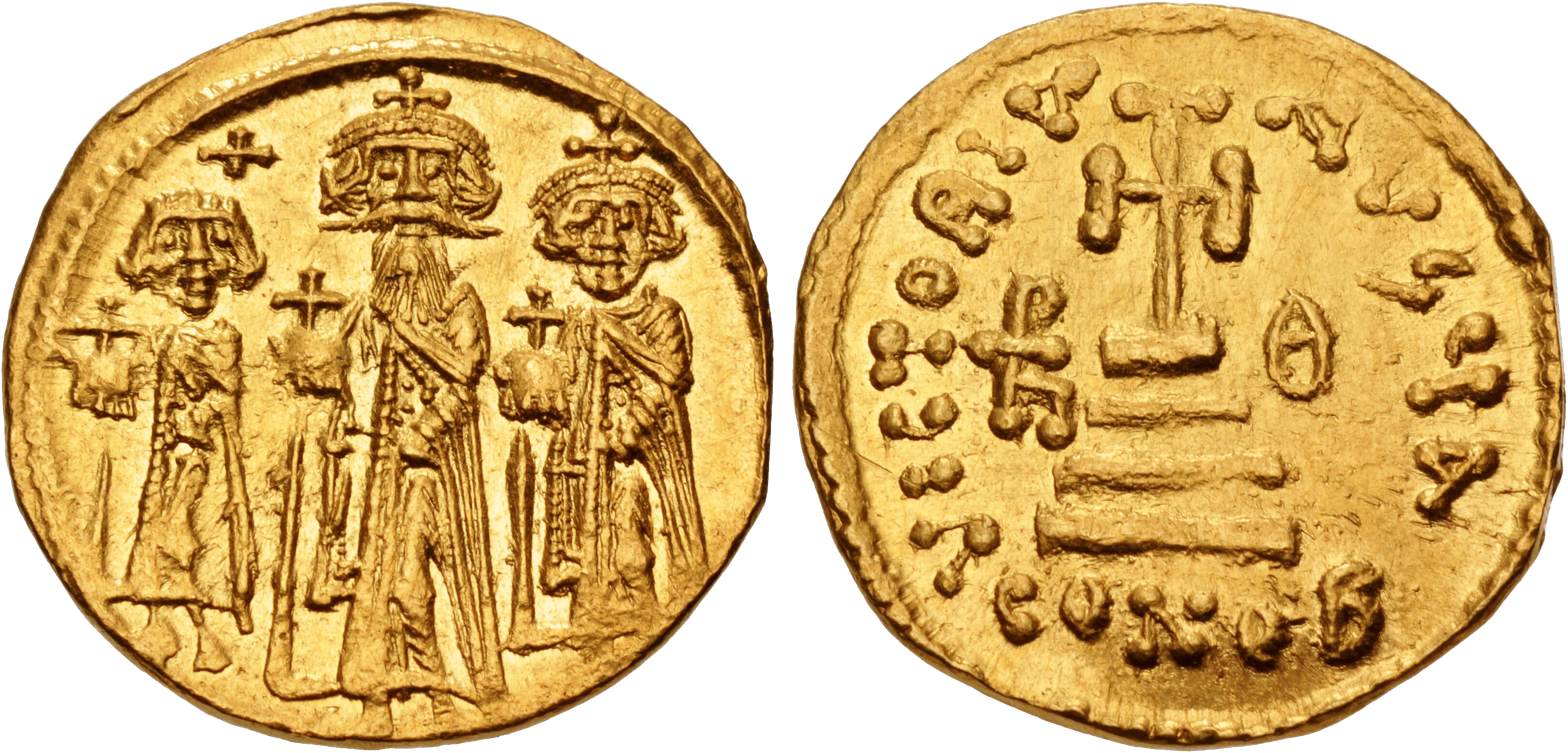
Solidus showing Heraclius (middle, with the large beard) in his later reign flanked by his sons Heraclius Constantine and Heraclonas

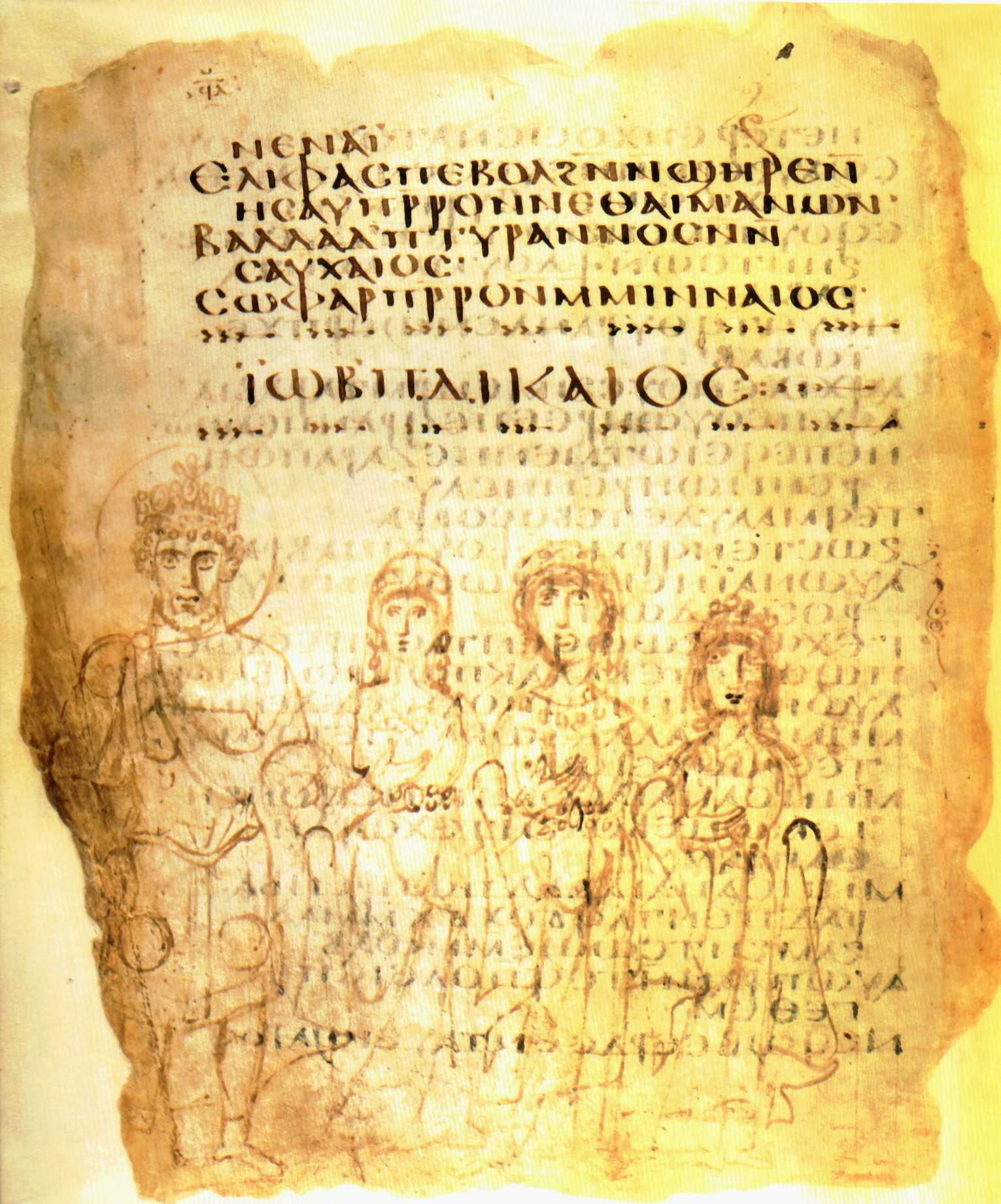
An early 7th-century drawing of Job and his family, likely represented as Heraclius (left), his second wife Martina, his sister Epiphania, and his daughter Eudoxia, on a 5th-century biblical manuscript. (Note: The artist very likely used pre-existing portraits of Heraclius and his family. Heraclius is noted as being similar to how he's described in literary sources and how he appears in his early coinage.)

According to biographer Nikephoros, Heraclius had his urethra on the upper side of the shaft of his penis, rather than at the tip, causing the urine to flow upward toward his face. To prevent the mess, he placed a wooden plank on his belly. Historians differ on the nature of the disease based on the symptoms, as it may be dropsy, prostate, or epispadias. Medical historian J. Lascaratos considered it the first recorded case of epispadias. However, Nikephoros was hostile toward the emperor and, along with contemporary critics, portrayed this (potentially discredited) description as divine wrath against the emperor for his illicit marriage to Martina, spreading the story to embarrass him.

Heraclius was married twice: first to Eudokia, a daughter of Rogatus, and then to his niece Martina. He had two children with Fabia (Eudoxia Epiphania and Heraclius Constantine) and at least nine with Martina, many of whom were sickly children. (Note: The number and order of Heraclius's children by Martina is unsure, with some sources saying nine children and others ten.) Of Martina's children, at least two were disabled, which was seen as punishment for the illegality of the marriage: Fabius had a paralyzed neck and Theodosius was a deaf-mute. The latter married Nike, daughter of Shahrbaraz.

Heraclius was succeeded by two of his children: Heraclius Constantine, his son with Eudokia, and Martina's son Heraclius (Heraclonas). Constantine was crowned co-emperor (augustus) on 22 January 613, at the age of 8 months. Heraclonas was made caesar on 1 January 632, aged 6, and was later crowned augustus on 4 July 638. A third son, David, was also crowned in 641 under the regnal name of "Tiberius". They ruled for a few months in 641, but were eventually succeeded by Constans II, the son of Heraclius Constantine, by the end of the year.

Heraclius had at least one illegitimate son, John Athalarichos, who conspired against Heraclius with his cousin, the magister Theodorus, and the Armenian noble David Saharuni. (Note: The illegitimate son is recorded by a number of different spellings including: Atalarichos, Athalaric, At'alarik, etc.) When Heraclius discovered the plot, he had Athalarichos's nose and hands cut off, and he was exiled to Prinkipo, one of the Princes' Islands. Theodorus received the same treatment, but was sent to Gaudomelete (possibly modern-day Gozo Island) with additional instructions to cut off one leg.

During the last years of Heraclius's life, it became evident that a struggle was taking place between Heraclius Constantine and Martina, who was trying to position her son Heraclonas to assume the throne. When Heraclius died, he devised the empire to both Heraclius Constantine and Heraclonas to rule jointly with Martina as empress.

== See also ==
- Cathedral of Mren – Church built in honor of Heraclius' entry into Jerusalem
- Colossus of Barletta – Late antique bronze statue traditionally believed to depict Heraclius (disputed)

== Sources ==
=== Primary ===
- Nicephorus I of Constantinople (1990) [8th–9th century]. Short history. Translated by Mango, Cyril. Dumbarton Oaks. ISBN 0-88402-184-X.
- De Administrando Imperio. Chapter 32: "[Of the Serbs and of the country they now dwell in]". "the emperor brought elders from Rome and baptized them and taught them fairly to perform the works of piety and expounded to them the faith of the Christians".
- John of Nikiû (2007) [7th century]. The Chronicle of John, Bishop of Nikiu. Translated by Robert Henry Charles. Evolution Pub. ISBN 9781889758879. (online)
- Sebeos. "Chapter 29". Sebeos' History: A History of Heraclius. Translated from Old Armenian by Robert Bedrosian. History Workshop. Archived from the original on 9 December 2008.
- Theophanes the Confessor (1997) [8th–9th centuries]. The Chronicle of Theophanes Confessor. Translated by Cyril Mango; Roger Scott. Oxford University Press. ISBN 0-19-822568-7.
- Chronicon Altinate. Translated by Roberto Cessi. Istituto storico italiano per il Medio Evo. 1933 [13th century]. OCLC 2236213.
- Chronicon Paschale. Translated by Michael Whitby; Mary Whitby. Liverpool University Press. 1989. ISBN 978-0-85323-0960.

=== Books ===
- Abdel, Haleem M. A. (2004). The Qur'an. Oxford University Press. ISBN 9780192805485.
- Beckwith, Christopher (2009). Empires of the Silk Road: A History of Central Eurasia from the Bronze Age to the Present (illustrated ed.). Princeton University Press. ISBN 978-0-691-13589-2.
- Bellinger, Alfred Raymond; Grierson, Philip (1992). Catalogue of the Byzantine coins in the Dumbarton Oaks Collection and in the Whittemore Collection. Vol. 2, parts 1–2. Dumbarton Oaks. ISBN 0-88402-024-X.
- Bury, John Bagnell (1889). A history of the later Roman empire from Arcadius to Irene. Vol. II. London: Macmillan Co. OCLC 1046525728.
- Conrad, Lawrence I. (2002). Reinink, Gerrit J.; Stolte, Bernard H. (eds.). Heraclius in early Islamic Kerygma. The reign of Heraclius (610–641): crisis and confrontation. Leuven-Paris-Dudley MA: Peeters. ISBN 978-90-429-1228-1.
- Davis, Leo Donald (1990). The first seven ecumenical councils (325–787): their history and theology. Liturgical Press. ISBN 0-8146-5616-1.
- Deanesly, Margaret (1969). A history of early medieval Europe, 476 to 911. Methuen young books. ISBN 0-416-29970-9.
- Evans, Helen C. (2018). Armenia: Art, Religion, and Trade in the Middle Ages. Metropolitan Museum of Art. ISBN 978-1-58839-660-0.
- Fidler, Richard (2018). Ghost empire: a journey to the legendary Constantinople. Pegasus. ISBN 978-1-68177-901-0.
- Franzius, Enno. "Heraclius". Encyclopædia Britannica.
- Gibbon, Edward (1994) [1781]. "Fall in the East". In David Womersley (ed.). The History of the Decline and Fall of the Roman Empire. Penguin. ISBN 978-0-14-043393-7.
- Greatrex, Geoffrey; Lieu, Samuel N. C. (2002). The Roman Eastern Frontier and the Persian Wars AD 363-628. Routledge. ISBN 978-0-415-46530-4.
- Grierson, Philip (1962). "The Tombs and Obits of the Byzantine Emperors (337–1042)". Dumbarton Oaks Papers. 16. doi:10.2307/1291157. JSTOR 1291157.
- Haldon, John (1997). Byzantium in the Seventh Century: the Transformation of a Culture. Cambridge University Press. ISBN 0-521-31917-X.
- Haykal, Muhammad Husayn (1994). The Life of Muhammad. The Other Press. ISBN 978-983-9154-17-7.
- Hitchner, R. Bruce (1991). "Cartagena". In Kazhdan, Alexander P. (ed.). The Oxford Dictionary of Byzantium. Oxford University Press. ISBN 978-0-19-504652-6.
- Jenkins, Romilly James Heald (1987). Byzantium: The Imperial Centuries, AD 610-1071. University of Toronto Press. ISBN 0-8020-6667-4.
- Kaegi, Walter E. (2003). Heraclius: emperor of Byzantium. Cambridge University Press. ISBN 0-521-81459-6.
- Kaegi, Walter Emil; Kazhdan, Alexander; Cutler, Anthony (1991). "Herakleios". In Kazhdan, Alexander P. (ed.). The Oxford Dictionary of Byzantium. Oxford University Press. ISBN 978-0-19-504652-6.
- Kaldellis, Anthony (2008). Hellenism in Byzantium: The Transformations of Greek Identity and the Reception of the Classical Tradition. Cambridge University Press. ISBN 9780521876889.
- Kaldellis, Anthony (2019). Romanland: Ethnicity and Empire in Byzantium. Harvard University Press. ISBN 978-0-674-98651-0.
- Lamers, Han (2015). Greece Reinvented: Transformations of Byzantine Hellenism in Renaissance Italy. Brill. ISBN 978-9004297555.
- Lewis, Bernard (2002). The Arabs in History. Oxford University Press. ISBN 0-19-280310-7.
- Lingenthal, C. E. Z. (1857). Jus Graeco-Romanum: Novellae Constitutiones. T. O. Weigel.
- Martindale, J. R., ed. (1992). "Heraclius 4". The Prosopography of the Later Roman Empire. Vol. 3. Cambridge University Press. pp. 586–587.
- Milani, Abbas (2004). Lost wisdom: rethinking modernity in Iran. Mage Publishers. ISBN 0-934211-89-2.
- Mitchell, Stephen (2007). A history of the later Roman Empire, AD 284–641: the transformation of the ancient world. Wiley-Blackwell. ISBN 9781405108577.
- Norwich, John Julius (1988). Byzantium: The Early Centuries. Guild.
- Olster, David Michael (1993). The politics of usurpation in the seventh century: rhetoric and revolution in Byzantium. A. M. Hakkert.
- Pourshariati, Parvaneh (2017). Decline and fall of the Sasanian empire: the Sasanian-Parthian confederacy and the Arab conquest of Iran. London: I. B. Tauris. ISBN 978-1-78453-747-0. OCLC 953439586.
- Redgate, Anne Elizabeth (2000). Armenians. Wiley. ISBN 978-0-631-14372-7.
- Russell, Eugenia (2013). Literature and Culture in Late Byzantine Thessalonica. Bloomsbury Academic. ISBN 978-1441161772.
- Schwartz, Ellen (2021). The Oxford Handbook of Byzantine Art and Architecture. Oxford University Press. ISBN 9780190277352.
- Spatharakis, Iohannis (1976). The portrait in Byzantine illuminated manuscripts. Brill Archive. ISBN 90-04-04783-2.
- Speck, Paul (1984). "Ikonoklasmus und die Anfänge der Makedonischen Renaissance". Varia 1 (Poikila Byzantina 4). Rudolf Halbelt. pp. 175–210.
- Syvänne, Ilkka (2023). Military History of Late Rome 602–641. Pen & Sword Military. ISBN 978-1 39907-567-1.
- Thomson, Robert W.; Howard-Johnston, James; Greenwood, Tim (1999). The Armenian history attributed to Sebeos. Liverpool University Press. ISBN 0-85323-564-3.
- Treadgold, Warren (1997). A History of Byzantine State and Society. University of Stanford Press. ISBN 0-8047-2630-2.
- Vasiliev, Alexander A. (1958). History of the Byzantine Empire, 324–1453. University of Wisconsin Press. ISBN 978-0-299-80925-6.
- Weitzmann, Kurt (1979). Age of Spirituality: Late Antique and Early Christian Art, Third to Seventh Century. Metropolitan Museum of Art. ISBN 0-87099-179-5.
- Zuckerman, Constantin (2013). "Heraclius and the return of the Holy Cross". Constructing the Seventh Century. Travaux et mémoires. Vol. 17. Paris: Association des amis du Centre d'histoire et civilisation de Byzance. pp. 197–218. ISBN 978-2-916716-45-9. Archived from the original on 10 February 2018.

=== Journals ===
- Alexander, Suzanne Spain (April 1977). "Heraclius, Byzantine Imperial Ideology, and the David Plates". Medieval Academy of America. 52 (2): 217–237. doi:10.2307/2850511. JSTOR 2850511. S2CID 161886591.
- Baert, Barbara (2008). "Héraclius, l'Exaltation de la Croix et le Mont-Saint-Michel au XIe siècle". Cahiers de Civilisation médiévale (in French) (51): 3–20.
- Baynes, Norman H. (1912). "The restoration of the Cross at Jerusalem". The English Historical Review. 27 (106): 287–299. doi:10.1093/ehr/XXVII.CVI.287. ISSN 0013-8266.
- Cameron, Averil (1979). "Images of Authority: Elites and Icons in Late Sixth-century Byzantium". Past and Present (84): 3. doi:10.1093/past/84.1.3.
- Charanis, Peter (1959). "Ethnic Changes in the Byzantine Empire in the Seventh Century". Dumbarton Oaks Papers. 13 (1). Trustees for Harvard University: 23–44. doi:10.2307/1291127. ISSN 0070-7546. JSTOR 1291127.
- El-Cheikh, Nadia Maria (1999). "Muḥammad and Heraclius: A Study in Legitimacy". Studia Islamica. 62 (89). Maisonneuve & Larose: 5–21. doi:10.2307/1596083. ISSN 0585-5292. JSTOR 1596083.
- Foss, Clive (1975). "The Persians in Asia Minor and the End of Antiquity". The English Historical Review. 90: 721–47. doi:10.1093/ehr/XC.CCCLVII.721.
- Frolow, Anatole (1953). "La Vraie Croix et les expéditions d'Héraclius en Perse". Revue des études byzantines. 11 (11): 88–105. doi:10.3406/rebyz.1953.1075.
- Grabar, André (1984). L'Iconoclasme Byzantin: le Dossier Archéologique (in French). Flammarion. ISBN 2-08-081634-9.
- Kouymjian, Dickran (1983). "Ethnic Origins and the 'Armenian' Policy of Emperor Heraclius". Revue des Études Arméniennes. XVII.
- Lascaratos, J.; Poulakou-Rembelakou, E.; Rembelakos, A.; Marketos, S. (1995). "The first case of epispadias: an unknown disease of the Byzantine Emperor Heraclius (610–641 AD)". British Journal of Urology. 76 (3): 380–383. doi:10.1111/j.1464-410X.1995.tb07718.x.
- Souza, Guilherme Queiroz de (2015). "Heraclius, emperor of Byzantium" (PDF). Revista Digital de Iconografía Medieval. 7 (14): 27–38.

Heraclius Heraclian Dynasty Born: ca. 575 Died: 11 February 641
Regnal titles
Preceded by Phocas	Byzantine emperor 610–641 with Constantine III Heraclius from 613	Succeeded by Constantine III and Heraclonas
Political offices
Preceded by Phocas, 603, then lapsed	Roman consul 608 and 611 with Heraclius the Elder, against Phocas (608)	Succeeded by Lapsed, then Heraclius Constantine in 632
