= Political mutilation in Byzantine culture =

Criminal punishment used against rivals

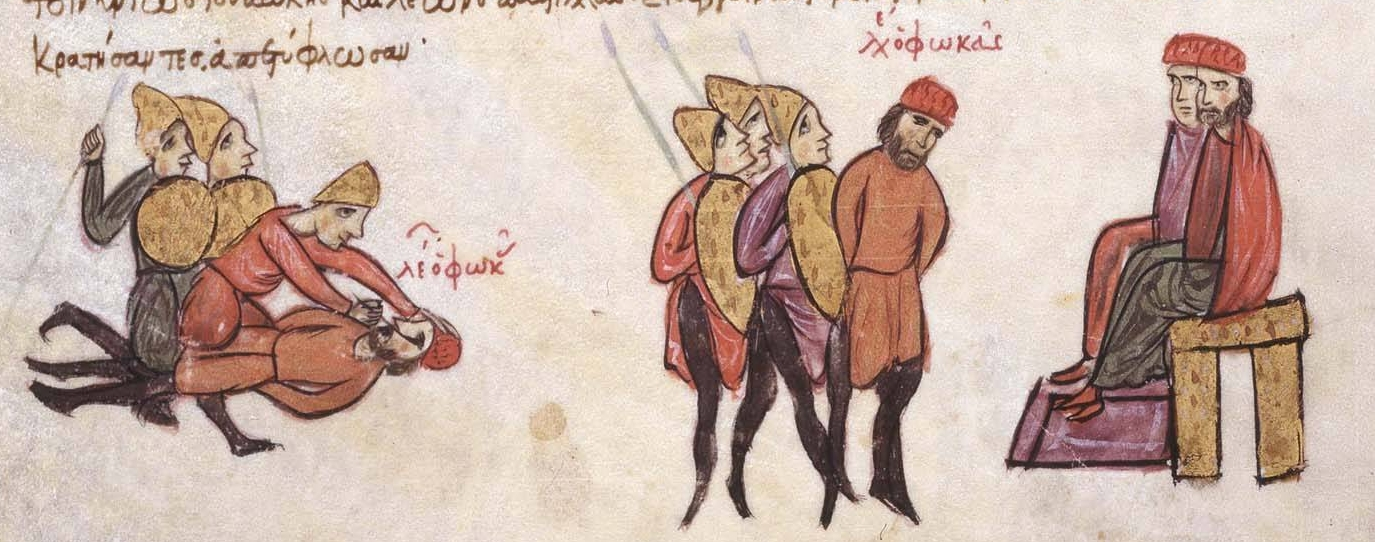
Depiction of the blinding of Leo Phokas the Elder after his unsuccessful rebellion against Romanos Lekapenos, from the Madrid Skylitzes chronicle

Mutilation was a common method of punishment for criminals in the Byzantine Empire, but it also had a role in the empire's political life. By blinding a rival, one would not only restrict his mobility but also make it almost impossible for him to lead an army into battle, then an important part of taking control of the empire. Castration was also used to eliminate potential opponents. In the Byzantine Empire, for a man to be castrated meant that he was no longer a man—half-dead, "life that was half death". Castration also eliminated any chance of heirs being born to threaten either the emperor's or the emperor's children's place at the throne. Other mutilations were the severing of the nose (rhinotomy), or the amputating of limbs.

== Rationale ==
The mutilation of political rivals by the emperor was deemed an effective way of side-lining from the line of succession a person who was seen as a threat. Castrated men were not seen as a threat, as no matter how much power they gained they could never take the throne, and numerous eunuchs were entrusted with high and confidential offices in the Byzantine court and administration. In Byzantine culture, the emperor was a reflection of heavenly authority. Since God was perfect, the emperor also had to be unblemished; any mutilation, especially facial wounds, would disqualify an individual from taking the throne. An exception was Justinian II (ὁ Ῥινότμητος, "the slit-nosed"), who had his nose cut off when he was overthrown in 695 but was able to become emperor again in 705.

== History ==
Blinding as a punishment for political rivals and a recognized penalty for treachery was established in 705, although Phocas (r. 602–610) used it earlier during his rule as well, becoming common practice from Heraclius (r. 610–641) onwards. Castration as a punishment for political rivals did not come into use until much later, becoming popular in the 10th and 11th centuries. An example is that of Basil Lekapenos, the illegitimate son of Emperor Romanos I Lekapenos, who was castrated when young. He gained enough power to become parakoimomenos and effective prime minister for three successive emperors, but could not assume the throne himself.

== Cases of disfigurement ==
Victim	Date	Disfigurement	Details	Reference
Alexios Philanthropenos	1295	Blinded	Governor of the Thracesian Theme, he rose up against Andronikos II Palaiologos, but was captured by loyalist soldiers and blinded	
Anastasius	743	Blinded	For supporting Artabasdos's usurpation against Constantine V he was blinded	
Artabasdos	743	Blinded	Artabasdos and his sons Nikephoros and Niketas were blinded for his failed insurrection against Constantine V during the iconoclasm crisis	
Sisinnios	743	Blinded	Strategos of the Thracesians, he supported Constantine V against Artabasdos but was blinded after the former's victory due to suspicions of conspiring to seize the throne himself	
Antiochos, David, Theophylact of Iconium, Christopher, Constantine, Theophylact the kandidatos, and 11 others	766	Blinded	High-ranking provincial governors and court officials, members of a group of nineteen who conspired against Constantine V. The plot was discovered and its members publicly paraded at the Hippodrome on 25 August 766. The two ringleaders, brothers Constantine and Strategios Podopagouros, were executed, the rest blinded and exiled, and every year imperial agents were sent to deliver 100 lashes.	
John Athalarichos	637	Nose and hands amputated	Amputation carried out after he tried to overthrow his father, Heraclius; his co-conspirator Theodore who received the same punishment was exiled and also had one leg amputated.	
Theodorus	637	Nose, hands and one leg amputated	Mutilated for being a co-planner in Athalarichos's attempt to overthrow Heraclius	
Bardanes Tourkos	803/804	Blinded	Led an unsuccessful revolt against Nikephoros I and surrendered. Blinded whilst in confinement in a monastery, likely on Nikephoros' orders.	
Bardas Phokas	1026	Blinded	Accused of plotting against Constantine VIII	
Constantine Diogenes	1095	Blinded	Impostor pretender, led a Cuman invasion of Thrace against Alexios I Komnenos	
Philippikos Bardanes, Theodore Myakes, George Bouraphos	713	Blinded	A rebellion of Opsician troops succeeded in getting a number of men into the city where they were able to blind Philippicus at a bathhouse on June 3, 713. He was followed a week later by the patrikios Theodore Myakes and a week after that by the Count of the Opsicians, the patrikios George Bouraphos	
Callinicus	705	Blinded	Supported the overthrow of Justinian II and was blinded when he came back to power in 705	
Constantine VI	797	Blinded	Emperor who was blinded by supporters of his mother, Irene of Athens. Constantine died of his injuries shortly thereafter, leading to Irene being crowned the empress regnant.	
Constantine, Basil, Gregory and Theodosios	820	Castrated	The sons of Leo V the Armenian, who was deposed on Christmas Day, 820, by Michael II the Amorian. They were exiled to Prote, castrated and confined to a monastery as monks. One of them (Theodosios, the youngest) did not survive the procedure.	
Leo Phokas	919	Blinded	Rose up against the assumption of power by Romanos Lekapenos but was captured and blinded	
Constantine Aspietes	1190/1	Blinded	Suspected of plotting a revolt against Isaac II Angelos because he distributed delayed pay to his troops	
Leo Phokas	971	Blinded	Plotted a revolt against John I Tzimiskes	
Nikephoros	792	Blinded	Uncle of Constantine VI, blinded, while his four brothers had their tongues cut, after the tagmata conspired to put him on the throne in the aftermath of the Battle of Marcellae	
Alexios Mosele	792	Blinded	General of the Armeniacs, blinded because of their refusal to acknowledge Irene of Athens as empress and co-ruler of Constantine VI	
Constantine Diogenes	1028–1034 (Note: Lost his eyes sometime in the reign of Emperor Romanos III Argyros (November 15, 1028 – April 11, 1034))	Blinded	The popular general was blinded because of a supposed plot against Romanos III Argyros	
Nikephoros Bryennios	1078	Blinded	Nikephoros had rebelled against Michael VII in 1077, and continued his rebellion against Nikephoros III Botaneiates. Defeated and captured by Alexios Komnenos at Kalavrye, he was blinded.	
Nikephoros Diogenes	1094	Blinded	Nikephoros was Romanos IV Diogenes's son with Eudokia Makrembolitissa; Emperor Alexios I Komnenos had him blinded after charging him with treason	
Romanos IV Diogenes	1072	Blinded	Andronikos Doukas had Romanos IV Diogenes blinded after tricking him into stepping down as emperor	
Heraklonas, David, Martinus	641	Rhinotomy, castrated	Overthrown, disfigured, castrated and exiled by supporters of Constans II	
Theophylact, Niketas (the future Patriarch Ignatius) and Staurakios	813	Castrated	Sons of Michael I Rhangabe, they were castrated after his overthrow by Leo V the Armenian	
Justinian II	695	Rhinotomy	Overthrown, disfigured and exiled by supporters of Leontios	
Alexios Komnenos	1182	Blinded, possibly castrated	De facto regent for Alexios II Komnenos, overthrown by the usurper Andronikos I Komnenos	
John IV Laskaris	1261	Blinded	Made emperor at seven years old, he was overthrown and blinded when he was eleven years old	
Basil Lekapenos	920–944 (Note: Basil Lekapenos was castrated as an infant sometime during Emperor Romanos I Lekapenos's rule (920–944). However, there is no date on either the castration or on when he was born.)	Castrated	As an infant he was castrated for being born an illegitimate son to Emperor Romanos I Lekapenos	
Martina	641	Tongue cut out	Overthrown, disfigured and exiled by supporters of Constans II	
Symbatios the Armenian	866/867	One eye gouged out, right arm cut off	Rebelled with George Peganes against Michael III's raising Basil the Macedonian as co-emperor	
George Peganes	866/867	Blinded, Rhinotomy	Rebelled with Symbatios the Armenian against Michael III's raising Basil the Macedonian as co-emperor	
The family of John the Orphanotrophos	1041	Castrated	Michael V castrated all male members of John the Orphanotrophos's family	
John the Orphanotrophos	1043	Blinded	Was seen as a threat so he was blinded by the patriarch of Constantinople Michael Cerularius	
Prousianos	1029	Blinded	After a supposed plot against Romanos III Argyros, he was blinded	
Isaac II Angelos	1195	Blinded	Blinded and deposed by his brother Alexios III Angelos	
Leontios	698	Blinded	Blinded and deposed by Tiberios III and later killed by Justinian II in 705	

== Sources ==
- Garland, Lynda (1999), Byzantine empresses: women and power in Byzantium, AD 527–1204, Routledge, ISBN 0-415-14688-7 – Total pages: 343
- Garland, Lynda (2006), Byzantine women: varieties of experience 800–1200, Ashgate Publishing, ISBN 0-7546-5737-X – Total pages: 226
- Hackel, Sergei (2001), The Byzantine saint, St Vladimir's Seminary Press, ISBN 0-88141-202-3 – Total pages: 245
- Holmes, Catherine (2005), Basil II and the governance of Empire (976–1025), Oxford University Press, ISBN 0-19-927968-3 – Total pages: 625
- Kazhdan, Alexander, ed. (1991). The Oxford Dictionary of Byzantium. Oxford and New York: Oxford University Press. ISBN 0-19-504652-8.
- Kiminas, Demetrius (2009), The Ecumenical Patriarchate: A History of Its Metropolitans With Annotated, Wildside Press LLC, ISBN 978-1-4344-5876-6 – Total pages: 256
- Kountoura-Galaki, Eleonora (1983), "Ἡ ἐπανάσταση τοῦ Βαρδάνη Τούρκου" [The revolt of Bardanes Tourkos], Byzantina Symmeikta (in Greek), 5 (5): 203–215, doi:10.12681/byzsym.685, ISSN 1105-1639
- Lilie, Ralph-Johannes; Ludwig, Claudia; Pratsch, Thomas; Zielke, Beate (2013). Prosopographie der mittelbyzantinischen Zeit Online. Berlin-Brandenburgische Akademie der Wissenschaften. Nach Vorarbeiten F. Winkelmanns erstellt (in German). Berlin and Boston: De Gruyter.
- Longworth, Philip (1997), The making of Eastern Europe: from prehistory to postcommunism, Palgrave Macmillan, ISBN 0-312-17445-4 – Total pages: 352
- Magoulias, Harry J., ed. (1984), O City of Byzantium, Annals of Niketas Choniates, Wayne State University Press, ISBN 0-8143-1764-2 – Total pages: 441
- Mango, Cyril; Scott, Roger (1997). The Chronicle of Theophanes Confessor. Byzantine and Near Eastern History, AD 284–813. Oxford: Oxford University Press. ISBN 0-19-822568-7.
- Milman, Henry Hart (1867), History of Latin Christianity: including that of the popes to the pontificate of Nicolas V., J. Murray – Total pages: 443
- Nicephorus (1990), Short history Volume 13 of Corpus Fontium Historiae Byzantinae Volume 10 of Dumbarton Oaks texts, translated by Cyril Mango, Dumbarton Oaks, ISBN 0-88402-184-X – Total pages: 247
- Nicol, Donald M. (1993) [1972]. The Last Centuries of Byzantium, 1261–1453 (Second ed.). Cambridge: Cambridge University Press. ISBN 978-0-521-43991-6.
- Norwich, John Julius (1993), Byzantium: the apogee, Penguin, ISBN 0-14-011448-3 – Total pages: 389
- Ostrogorski, George Alexandrovič (1957), History of the Byzantine State, Rutgers University Press, ISBN 0-8135-1198-4 – Total pages: 548
- Rautman, Marcus Louis (2006), Daily life in the Byzantine Empire, Greenwood Publishing Group, ISBN 0-313-32437-9 – Total pages: 342
- Ringrose, Kathryn M. (2003), The perfect servant: eunuchs and the social construction of gender in Byzantium, University of Chicago Press, ISBN 0-226-72015-2 – Total pages: 295
- Rochow, Ilse (1994), Kaiser Konstantin V. (741–775). Materialien zu seinem Leben und Nachleben (in German), Frankfurt am Main: Peter Lang, ISBN 3-631-47138-6
- Savvides, Alexis G. K. (1991). "Notes on the Armeno-Byzantine family of Aspietes, late 11th-early 13th centuries". Byzantinoslavica. 52. Prague: 70–79.
- Skoulatos, Basile (1980). Les personnages byzantins de l'Alexiade: Analyse prosopographique et synthèse [The Byzantine Personalities of the Alexiad: Prosopographical Analysis and Synthesis] (in French). Louvain-la-Neuve and Louvain: Bureau du Recueil Collège Érasme and Éditions Nauwelaerts.
- Talbot, Alice-Mary; Sullivan, Denis F. (2005), The History of Leo the Deacon: Byzantine Military Expansion in the Tenth Century, Dumbarton Oaks, ISBN 0-88402-324-9 – Total pages: 264
- Theophanes (1982), The chronicle of Theophanes: an English translation of anni mundi 6095–6305 (A.D. 602–813), translated by Harry Turtledove, University of Pennsylvania Press, ISBN 0-8122-1128-6 – Total pages: 201
- Treadgold, Warren (1988). The Byzantine Revival, 780–842. Stanford, California: Stanford University Press. ISBN 978-0-8047-1462-4.
- Treadgold, Warren (1997). A History of the Byzantine State and Society. Stanford, California: Stanford University Press. ISBN 0-8047-2630-2.
