= Varaztirots II Bagratuni =

Armenian nakharar

Varaztirots II Bagratuni Վարազ-Տիրոց Բ Բագրատունի
- Born: Unknown
- Died: 645 or 646
- House: House of Bagratuni
- Father: Smbat IV Bagratuni
- Religion: Armenian Apostolic Church

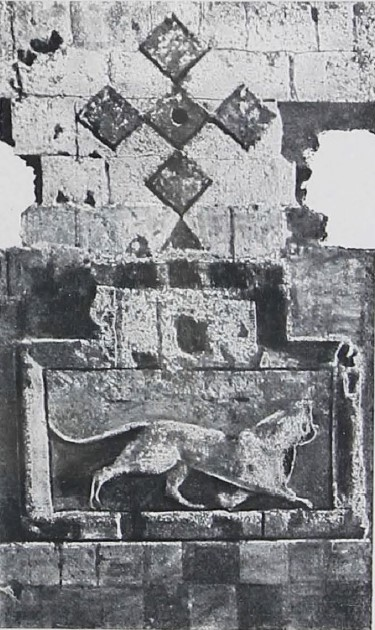

Varaztirots II Bagratuni (Armenian: Վարազ-Տիրոց Բ Բագրատունի; c. 590 – 645) was an Armenian nakharar from the Bagratuni family, the son of Smbat IV Bagratuni. He was marzpan of Armenia c. 628, fled to the Byzantine Empire soon thereafter and was exiled for several years to Africa for his participation in a plot against Heraclius. On his return c. 645/6, he was named curopalates and presiding prince of Armenia, but died before being formally invested.

== Life ==
Varaztirots was the eldest son of Smbat IV Bagratuni. Along with his brother Garikhpet, he grew up in the Sassanid Persian court of Khosrow II (r. 590–628). Following the defeat of the rebellion of Vistahm, in which his father was instrumental, Varaztirots was named a royal cupbearer. At that point, or after Smbat's victory over the Hephthalites in 608, he also received the honorific name Javitean Khosrow ("Eternal Khosrow").

The Armenian historian Sebeos also identifies Varaztirots as the son of Smbat Bagratuni and reports that he was raised at the Persian court in conditions comparable to those enjoyed by the royal princes. His appointment as cupbearer placed him in direct service to Khosrow II and reflected the confidence he enjoyed at the Sasanian court.

In 628, Khosrow II was overthrown after a conspiracy in which several aristocratic houses, including Varaztirots, took part. As a reward, the new Persian shah, Kavad II, appointed Varaztirots as marzpan of Armenia, with the rank of aspet. He soon quarrelled with the Persian governor of neighbouring Atropatene, however, and fled with his family to the Byzantine emperor Heraclius, who, following the end of the Byzantine–Sasanian War of 602–628, resided with his court in northern Mesopotamia. According to the Armenian chronicler Sebeos, Heraclius welcomed him with great honours, gave him valuable gifts and "exalted him above all the patricians of his kingdom".

Sebeos provides further information about Varaztirots's appointment and position in Armenia. According to the chronicler, Kavad II summoned him to the royal court, granted him the office of tanuter (head of a princely house) and appointed him marzpan of Armenia. Varaztirots subsequently returned to Armenia exercising authority over his ancestral domains. Sebeos states that the Armenian country welcomed him joyfully, suggesting that his authority rested not only on his appointment by the Sasanian monarch but also on the standing of the Bagratuni family.

Varaztirots's administration was positively assessed by Sebeos, who wrote that he had brought prosperity to Armenia. The chronicler's statement, “շինեաց բոլորովին զամենայն աշխարհն Հայոց” (“he completely prospered the whole land of Armenia”), is cited as evidence of this favourable assessment of his rule.

Varaztirots also became involved in Armenian ecclesiastical affairs. Following the death of Catholicos Komitas, he participated in the selection of a new head of the Armenian Church. Under the leadership of Theodore Rshtuni, Christopher, a hermit from the house of Abraham, was chosen. His subsequent activities, however, led to unrest, and Sebeos reports that accusations made by Christopher contributed to a dispute between Varaztirots and his brother.

The inscription of Bagaran also mentions Varaztirots’s office and title. The inscription contains the phrase “ի մարզպանութեան Վարազտիրոցի հայոց ասպետի յառուեղեան,” which is associated with Varaztirots’s tenure as marzpan and the mention of the title “Aspet of the Armenians.” This evidence is important for studying his official status and the use of the title Aspet. The inscription is discussed in Koghean’s work Kmsrknery, p. 137.

During the weakening of Sasanian power, Varaztirots and Theodore Rshtuni pursued policies aimed at preserving or strengthening Armenia's internal autonomy. Nevertheless, Armenia's political position remained dependent on the wider rivalry between Persia and Byzantium.

The Armenian historian Sebeos provides a more detailed account of the conflict that preceded Varaztirots's departure from Armenia. Varaztirots refused to submit first to Khoroh Ormizd, the Persian governor of Atropatene, and subsequently to the governor's son, Rostom, who sought to become marzpan of Armenia. The dispute escalated when the Byzantine commander Mzhezh Gnuni urged Rostom to remove Varaztirots from Armenia, warning that failure to do so could intensify tensions between the two powers.

Rostom decided to arrest Varaztirots and sent his brother to Dvin for this purpose. Having learned of the plan in advance, Varaztirots left secretly at night with his wife and sons and went to Taron. There he assembled his forces and established contact with Heraclius. This account adds detail to the circumstances of his flight and indicates that his departure followed a political and military confrontation rather than a voluntary abandonment of his position.

According to Sebeos, Varaztirots sought an assurance from Heraclius that the emperor would not prevent him from returning to his homeland. Heraclius promised that he would eventually restore him to his country with great honour. Varaztirots received royal residences and treasures at the Byzantine court, while his son Smbat was also treated with respect in the emperor's circle.

In 635 or 637, however, Varaztirots became involved in a conspiracy by several Armenian magnates to overthrow and murder Heraclius and replace him with his son, John Athalarichos. The conspiracy was uncovered, and Varaztirots was exiled to Africa; the treatment he received was more merciful than that of his co-conspirators as he had opposed the murder of the emperor.

Sebeos's account further emphasizes that Varaztirots refused to support the plan to kill Heraclius and his sons. He reportedly argued that the conspirators themselves regarded the emperor as God's representative and therefore rejected their proposed course of action. This detail helps explain why Varaztirots received more lenient treatment than other participants in the conspiracy, although it did not prevent his exile.

Following the discovery of the plot, Heraclius punished those involved, including his son Athalarichos and his nephew. Varaztirots was exiled to Africa together with his wife and sons. His opposition to the emperor's murder distinguished his case from those of the other conspirators and contributed to the comparatively mild nature of his punishment.

On his death-bed in 641, Heraclius pardoned Varaztrots and made his successor, Constantine III, swear that he would recall him and his family from exile and restore their honours. In the event, Varaztirots was recalled only in 645/6, by Constans II at the urging of Theodore Rshtuni. Varaztirots quickly fled from Constantinople to Armenia, but after assurances of loyalty, Constans then appointed him governor of Armenia with the high rank of curopalates. Before he could be formally invested, however, he fell ill and died. He was buried next to his father at Dariwnk, in Kogovit.

According to the Armenian account, after Heraclius's death, the Byzantine commander Theodore appealed to Constans II to pardon those exiled to Africa, particularly Varaztirots. The emperor agreed to their return. Sebeos relates that Varaztirots met Theodore Rshtuni and that the two men wept as they recalled having grown up together at the court of Khosrow II.

After returning from exile, Varaztirots did not immediately settle into the position prepared for him by the Byzantine emperor. In 645/646, after returning to Constantinople, he travelled secretly to Armenia and established himself in Tayk. According to Sebeos, he had asked Constans II for permission to send several members of his family to Armenia, but instead went there himself in disguise. He was received favourably in Tayk. In a letter to the emperor, Varaztirots reaffirmed that he had not renounced his allegiance, explaining that he had fled because he feared being exiled again.

Constans II ordered Varaztirots's arrest for leaving without authorization. Through the mediation of Catholicos Nerses III of Tayk, however, Varaztirots sent the emperor a written oath of allegiance. He was subsequently appointed presiding prince of Armenia and granted the rank of curopalates, as well as a silver throne. Other accounts associate his return and appointment with the years 645–646 and the intervention of Theodore Rshtuni.

Varaztirots died suddenly before the imperial decree confirming his appointment reached him. He was buried beside his father, Smbat Bagratuni, at Dariwnk in the district of Kogovit. According to Sebeos, the emperor then appointed Varaztirots's eldest son, Smbat, to his father's position, transferring to him the rights associated with the offices of tanuter and aspet and entrusting him with the military office of drungarius.

The exact chronology of Varaztirots's final years remains uncertain. Hrachya Acharian's dictionary gives 642 as the year in which Varaztirots became curopalates. A reference on page 69 of Arakelyan's Scientific Collection of ArmFan mentions 646 and subsequently 642. Acharian's account also connects Varaztirots's appointment with the fifth year of Constans II's reign, corresponding to 645. These discrepancies indicate that the chronology of his return, appointment, and death requires further comparison of the surviving sources.

== Sources ==
- Martindale, John R.; Jones, A.H.M.; Morris, John (1992). "Varaztiroch". The Prosopography of the Later Roman Empire: Volume III, AD 527–641. Cambridge University Press. pp. 1363–1364. ISBN 0-521-20160-8.
- Pourshariati, Parvaneh (2008). Decline and Fall of the Sasanian Empire: The Sasanian-Parthian Confederacy and the Arab Conquest of Iran. London and New York: I.B. Tauris. ISBN 978-1-84511-645-3.
