= Smbat IV Bagratuni =

Smbat IV Bagratuni Սմբատ Դ Բագրատունի

Marzban of Hyrcania
- Reign: 595 - 602
- Predecessor: Unknown
- Successor: Unknown

Marzban of Persian Armenia
- Reign: 607 - 616/617
- Predecessor: Boutmah
- Successor: Shahrayeanpet
- Born: Unknown
- Died: 616 or 617
- House: House of Bagratuni
- Father: Manuel Bagratuni
- Religion: Christianity

Smbat IV Bagratuni (Armenian: Սմբատ Դ Բագրատունի; Greek: Συμβάτιος) was an Armenian prince from the Bagratuni dynasty who served first in the Byzantine army before switching, ca. 595, to the Sasanian Empire, where he had a distinguished military career and earned high honours until his death in 616/7. He was succeeded by his son, Varaztirots.

== Life ==
Smbat was the son of Manvel Bagratuni. He is first mentioned in the 580s, when the Byzantine Emperor Maurice (reigned 582–602) requested Armenian nobles to form a cavalry force to fight in the wars against the Avars.

Smbat Bagratuni was one of those Armenian generals who, with the establishment of foreign rule in Armenia, were forced to abandon their post as head of the Armenian cavalry and serve other tyrannical powers, participating in wars waged in their interests and commanding Armenian cavalry in their peripheral territories. During the reign of Emperor Maurice, the policy of depriving Armenia of military power became a programmatic one.As is evident from the contents of Emperor Maurice's letter to Khosrow II, Armenia continued to maintain its military power, which prevented the warring states from remaining at peace and could not be ignored.

== Activities ==
At the end of the sixth century, Khosrow Parvez sent Smbat Bagratuni to fight against the Vachkatuni tribes in the eastern regions of Iran, with the goal of pacifying them.

After some time, Smbat returned from exile and entered the service of the Sasanian Shah Khosrow II, who appointed him marzpan (military governor) of Hyrcania (the southern coast of the Caspian Sea) in 595. Smbat served in this post until 602, but was initially occupied with suppressing the Vistahm rebellion in Khorasan and was then returned to the court of Ctesiphon. There, he received additional honors and was also appointed junior minister of finance. At the end of the sixth century, Khosrow Parvez appointed Smbat Bagratuni governor of Vrkani, gifting him the bow and sword of his father, Vormizd D. Initially, Smbat Bagratuni was occupied with suppressing rebellions against the Persian king in Amagha, Royan, Jrejan, and Taparistan. Smbat then handled the affairs of the governorship entrusted to him and, most importantly, conducted educational work among the Armenians captured in these regions and who had forgotten their native language.

Smbat was not always successful. He was defeated by the army of the Deghumk tribe near the village of Hekevand in the Komsh region, along with the Persian general Shahr Vakhrich, whose ranks also included Armenian soldiers outraged by the murder of the Amatun prince Kotit, who had previously joined Vstam in his rebellion against Khosrow. However, the following year, Smbat won a major victory in Taparistan, for which Khosrow expressed his satisfaction with the decree and awarded him the highest honor among all the ministers of his realm, sending him numerous gifts and appointing his son, Varaztirots, "to the position of Matruakutian."

It is noteworthy that during the Persian-Byzantine military operations in Mesopotamia and Armenia, the Persian king kept Smbat Bagratuni away from his homeland with Armenian fire, "entrusting" him with the defense of the remote outskirts of Iran from nomadic incursions and the rebels who had joined them. And during military operations against the imperial forces in Mesopotamia and Armenia, Khosrow's troops were led by Persian generals. Only during the aforementioned truce on the western front did Khosrow Parvez decide to send Smbat Bagratuni to Armenia. In such a situation, such a decision by the Persian king should not have been accidental. Smbat's dispatch to Armenia was most likely connected with the subsequent Persian campaigns against the Byzantines. This is also evidenced by the religious policies pursued by Khosrow Parvez. Despite Khosrow's plans, Smbat was active in Dvin, attempting to restore order to varying degrees in the country.

Around 607 (in the eighteenth year of Khosrow's reign), he was sent to Armenia with broad powers as "commander of the army of the rulers of the houses." His reign in Armenia was short but effective, as N. Garsoyan writes.

"Smbat's extraordinary powers allowed him to restore the authority of the Persian crown in Persia, restore the authority of the weakened Armenian Church by convening a council, which, after a three-year hiatus, elected a new Catholicos, Abraham I, and reestablish the council in Dvin, the administrative capital of Armenia, ignoring the objections of local Persian authorities."

== Smbat Bagratuni and the Armenian Church ==
Smbat Bagratuni resided in Armenia from late 606 until the spring of 608. Previously, Smbat Bagratuni had approached Khosrov Parvez with a request to regulate, in particular, church affairs in Armenia. He was aware of the death of Catholicos Movses II of Yeghvard (574–604) and therefore negotiated with the king to elect a new Catholicos. Before Smbat Bagratuni's arrival, a council was convened in Dvin in 606. The election of a Catholicos was not held, but several regulations were developed, directed, in particular, against the clergy who adhered to Chalcedonianism.

In 607, Smbat Bagratuni initiated the election of a new Catholicos, Abraham I of Agbataneti.[2] The aim of the Councils of Dvin in 606 and 607 was to preserve the independence of the Armenian monotheistic church from the divisive influence of the Byzantine Church, which had established a second Catholicosate in Western Armenia, headed by the Chalcedonian Hovhannes Bagrantes.

Bishop Manasses of Basen, who was in the Byzantine part of Armenia, participated in the elections to the Catholicosate in Dvin in 607. The confessional issue was further exacerbated by the activities of the Georgian Catholicos Kiryon (599–616) (606–608), which led to the separation of the Georgian church from the Armenian church (608). The efforts of Smbat Bagratuni and the Armenian clergy to keep Kiryon away from Chalcedonianism coincided with the interests of the Persian court, as Virk was moving closer to Byzantium on religious grounds. This is clearly evident in the letter of Catholicos Abraham I of Agbatana (607-610) to Kiryon.

Smbat Bagratuni "went to restore the main church of St. Gregory in Dvin." However, he was soon recalled to Persia due to the resumption of hostilities in the east and west. Upon his return, the king, in addition to awards, awarded him the honorary title of "Khosrow Shum" and again sent him to the eastern regions of Iran to lead the fight against invading nomadic tribes.

== Return to Persia ==
Khosrow Parvez summoned Smbat Bagratuni from Armenia to his country to fight the nomads. The Armenian Aryudz once again left their homeland to fight tooth and nail for foreign interests. Smbat-Khosrow Shum was accompanied by numerous Armenian ministers and their regiments, including Varaz-Shapukh Artsruni, Sargis Tayetsi, Artavazd, Vstam and Khmayak Apakhunis, Manuel Apakhuniats Ter, Vram Goghtniats Ter, Sargis Dimaksyan, and Sargis Trpatuni.

Smbat-Khosrow Shum defeated and fled the nomadic army, and formed his own army. Apr Shahri in the province of Tos. However, the struggle of the Armenian Aryudz did not end there; new trials lay ahead. The defeated nomads appealed to the khakan for help, who sent an army of 30,000 men. They routed the Persian army under the command of the Persian prince Datoyan. The Persian army's defeat was due to Datoyan's disregard for Smbat Khosrow Shum's advice to avoid battle. The nomads, scattered, reached the provinces of Khrew and Asfahan, and then returned to their camp. To ascertain the reasons for this defeat, Khosrow Parvez sent a certain supreme minister named Shahrapn Bandak. The latter acquitted Smbat Bagratuni and led Datoyan in chains to the royal palace, where he was executed. Persia's vital interests demanded that the nomadic incursions from the east be stopped at all costs. Therefore, a new army was assembled and again sent against them under the leadership of Smbat Bagratuni. Smbat routed the nomads and drove their army back to the city of Bahl Shahastan. From then on, Smbat lived at the Persian court, enjoying the honors bestowed upon him by Khosrow, until his death in 616/7. He was succeeded by his son, Varaztirot.

== Literature ==
1. Լեո, Երկերի ժողովածու․ Հ, 2, Երևան, 1967։
2. Սեբեոս, Պատմություն, Երևան, 1979։
3. Հայ Ժողովրդի պատմություն, հ․2, Երևան, 1984։
4. Ստեփանոս Սիւնյաց եպիսկոպոս, Պատմութիւն տանն Սիսական, Մոսկվա, 1861:
5. «Գիրք թղթոց»․ մատենագրութիւն նախնեաց։ Սահակ Մեսրոպեան Մատենադարան, Ե։ Թիֆլիս, 1901։
6. B. B. Бартольд, Историко-географический обзор Ирана, Соч., т. VII, М., 1971։
7. Юзбашян К. Н., Армянские государства эпохи Багратидов и Византия IX - XI вв. - М.: Изд-во "Наука", 1988.
8. Н. Марр, Аркаун, Монгольское название христиан в связи с вопросом армянах халкедонитах, "Византийский вре менник», т. ХІІ, 1906.
9. История епископа Себеоса. - Перевел с четвертого исправленного армянского издания Ст. Малхасянц. - Ер.: Издание АрмФАН-а, 1939.

== Notes ==
Preceded by Boutmah	Marzban of Persian Armenia; 607–616/617	Succeeded by Shahrayeanpet
