= Dumbarton Oaks Papers =

- Discipline: Byzantine art and medieval art
- Language: English

Publication details
- History: 1941-
- Publisher: Dumbarton Oaks (USA)

Standard abbreviations
- ISO 4: Dumbart. Oaks Pap.

Indexing
- ISSN: 0070-7546
- LCCN: 2005236610
- JSTOR: 00707546
- OCLC no.: 58423962

Links
- Journal homepage; etexts

Dumbarton Oaks Papers (DOP) is an academic journal founded in 1941 under the auspices of the Dumbarton Oaks Research Library and Collection for the publication of articles relating to Byzantine society and culture from the 4th to 15th century in the Roman Empire as well as its neighboring and successor states. The journal treats sources in medieval Greek, as well as other premodern languages, such as Arabic, Armenian, Coptic, Ethiopic, Georgian, Latin, Old Church Slavonic, and Syriac. Submissions address a range of topics, including art and iconography, architecture, archaeology, codicology, epigraphy, history, historiography, language, law, literature, music, numismatics, palaeography, science, sigillography, and theology.

Publication was suspended during World War II, resuming in 1946 irregularly at first, and eventually published annually by the mid-1950s.
