= Sebeos =

7th-century Armenian historian

Sebeos (Old Armenian: Սեբէոս) (Note: Also spelled Սեբիոս Sebios. Reformed orthography: Սեբեոս) was the author of a 7th-century Armenian history. Though his name is not known, he was likely a member of the clergy. It is the primary source for Armenian history in the 6th and 7th centuries. It is valued as the earliest surviving major account of the rise of Islam and the early Muslim conquests and as one of the very few non-Islamic sources on the Muslim conquests.

== Authorship ==
The history attributed to Sebeos has survived in a manuscript written in Bitlis in 1672 (now held at the Matenadaran in Armenia), in which it is included as an anonymous, untitled history in a collection of Armenian sources. (Note: An earlier manuscript with the history dating to 1568, in which the history is also untitled and anonymous, was used in the 1851 edition, but has since been lost. All other known copies are of the 1672 manuscript (Matenadaran no. 2639).) The name Sebeos, which is a shortened form of the name Eusebius, appears as the name of one of the Armenian bishops who signed the resolution of the Fourth Council of Dvin in 645: "Bishop Sebeos of the Bagratunis". Additionally, a historian named Sebeos (called a bishop by Samuel Anetsi), to whom is attributed a History of Heraclius, which has been assumed to be the same as the anonymous history of the 1672 manuscript, is included in some lists of Armenian historians. However, this is not universally accepted. (Note: The history attributed to Sebeos is not a history of the Eastern Roman emperor Heraclius. However, it contains several chapters about him, which is why the book's title includes his name. Similarly, the history is called the History of Khosrov in Vardan Baghishetsi's description of the 1672 manuscript because most of the work is dedicated to events during the reign of Sasanian king Khosrow II. However, according to Robert W. Thomson, judging from the surviving extracts from the History of Heraclius, it is not the same work as the history attributed to Sebeos.) Since the 19th century, many scholars have identified Bishop Sebeos of the Bagratunis with the historian Sebeos and attributed the anonymous history of the 1672 manuscript to the same person. However, Robert W. Thomson writes that these are only assumptions and writes, "[t]he author and original title of this work published as the History of Sebeos remain unknown." The author of the history never refers to the 645 Fourth Council of Dvin. The history attributed to Sebeos was known to and quoted by later Armenian historians. However, none of those who mentioned it ever acknowledged their source as the history of Sebeos.

The author places himself in the tradition of Armenian history-writing and indicates that he lived close to the events that he describes—that is, in the second half of the 7th century (the history ends with Mu'awiya I becoming caliph). Thomson writes that the author displays a knowledge of contemporary conditions and Iranian culture that would be surprising for someone living in later times and that the history resembles more an attempt to understand recent events and the realization of God’s will than "a subsequent, matured reflection with a specific purpose." There is little doubt that the author was a member of the Christian clergy. He shows a strong knowledge of religious matters, makes many biblical allusions and quotations, and appears to have had access to the Armenian church archives at Dvin. An episode in the history in which an Armenian bishop reluctantly takes communion with Byzantine emperor Constans II—but only after stating the Armenian church's doctrinal position from the Fourth Council of Dvin—may actually be an episode from the author's life told in the history in the third person. He writes from a Persian rather than a Roman perspective, but his sympathies are with Christian Byzantium in the wars between the Byzantine and Sasanian empires.

== Structure of the text ==
The first two sections of the text (chapters 1–6) are often considered to be the work of a different author than the rest of the history. The first section recounts the traditional story of the foundation of Armenia by Hayk (commonly known as the Primary History), as well as an account of the creation of the Parthian Empire. The second section includes a list of Armenian, Persian, and Greek kings and an account of the origins of the Mamikonian family. The main history attributed to Sebeos can be divided into three parts. The first part begins with the reign of Hormizd IV (r. 579–590) and narrates the period of cooperation between the Byzantine and Sasanian empires after the restoration of Khosrow II to the throne with Byzantine help in 591. The second part is about the final major Byzantine–Sasanian war, which is the central subject of the history. The third part covers the rise of Islam and the Muslim conquests. It concludes with the results of the first Muslim civil war (the accession of Mu’awiya) and describes its effects on Armenians.

== Importance ==
Sebeos's history is the primary source for Armenian history in the 6th and 7th centuries. It stands out from preceding Armenian histories and many later ones for its broad geographical scope, giving considerable attention to events in Iran, Byzantium, and the Islamic empire—even where these events did not directly affect Armenians and Armenia. It is valued as the earliest surviving major account of the rise of Islam and the early Muslim conquests and as one of the very few non-Islamic sources on the Muslim conquests. It is also an essential source for a crucial period of Iranian history. The author has also been praised for striving for objectivity and neutrality between the Armenian noble houses. Unlike several Armenian historians, he does not take the side of any particular Armenian noble house and has been described as "a patriotic historian, not unswervingly loyal to any one House, and a fervent defender of the independence of the Armenian Church." However, in Tim Greenwood's view, a focus on the Mamikonian family can be discerned in the history, and it is highly likely that Hamazasp IV Mamikonian, the prince of Armenia at the time, was the patron of the work. According to James Howard-Johnston, the history is the single most important source on the ending of classical antiquity and "on the whole, the history retailed is lucid and where it can be tested, it can be shown to be reliable."

== Publication history and translations ==
Sebeos's history was first published by Tatevos Mihrdatian in Constantinople in 1851 under the title Patmutiun Sebeosi episkoposi i Herakln (History of Bishop Sebeos on Heraclius) based on the 1672 manuscript and a 1568 manuscript which has since been lost. Additional Armenian editions were published in 1879, 1913, and 1939. It was translated into Russian by Kerovbe Patkanian in 1862 and by Stepan Malkhasiants in 1913. Heinrich Hübschmann translated parts of it into German in 1875. A translation into French—not including the first two sections, chapters 1–6—was published by Frédéric Macler in 1904. In 1979, G. V. Abgaryan published a critical edition of the Armenian text, including the first two sections. This was translated into modern Eastern Armenian in 2004. Robert Bedrosian completed an English translation of the 1879 Patkanian edition in 1979 (published in print in 2021–2023 in two volumes). Bedrosian also later translated the first two sections. C. Gugerotti published an Italian translation of the history, including the first two sections, in 1990. An English translation by Robert W. Thomson based on the 1979 critical edition was published in 1999. Thomson had earlier included a translation of the first section (the Primary History) in an appendix to his translation of Movses Khorenatsi's history (1978).
