= Battle of Aghdam (625) =

- Part of Byzantine-Sasanian War of 602-628 and the Heraclius Caucasus campaign
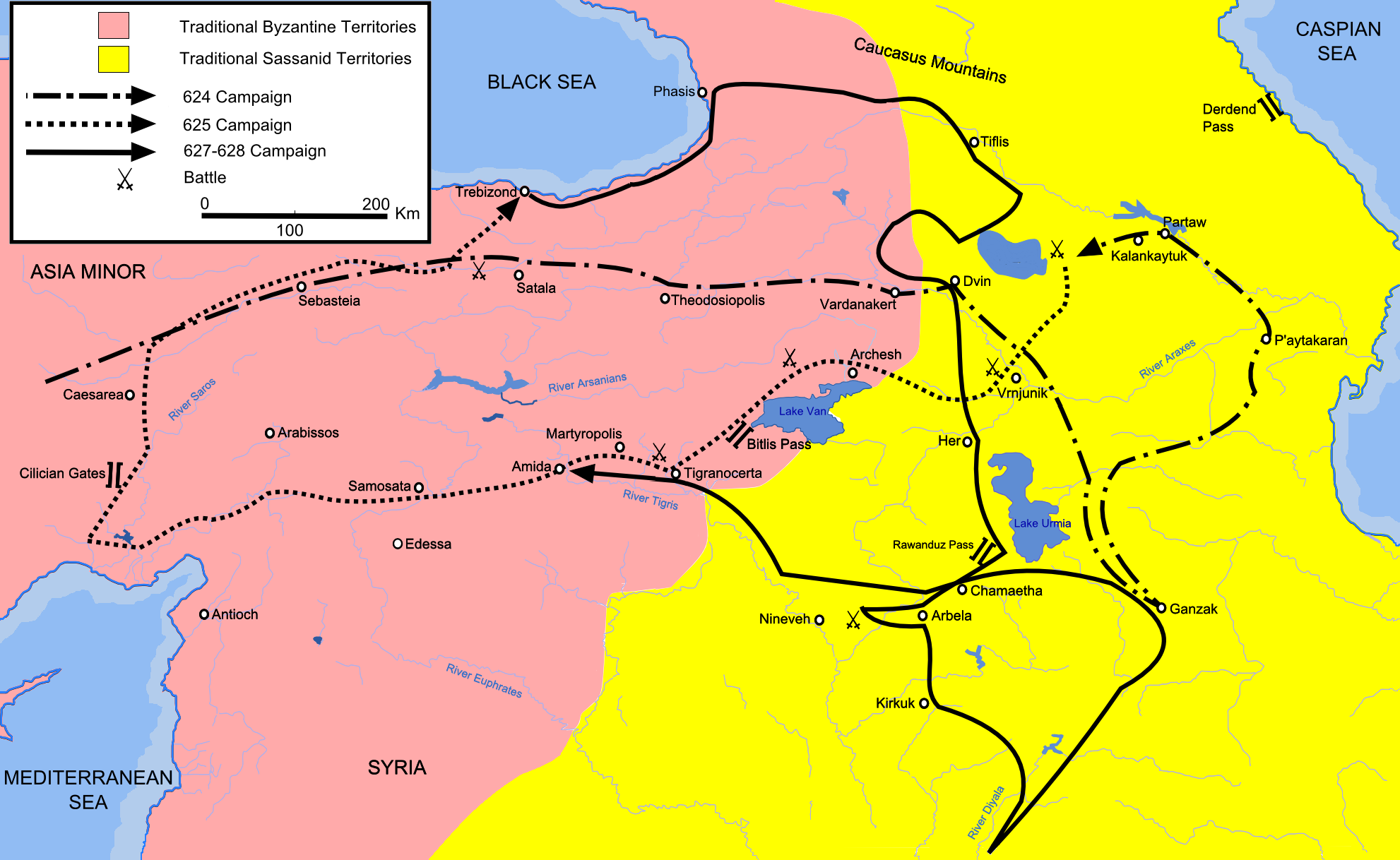
- Heraclius' Campaigns against the Sassanids
Date	January 625
Location	Aghdam, Sasanian Empire (modern Azerbaijan)
Result	Byzantine victory

Belligerents
Byzantine Empire	Sasanian Empire

Commanders and leaders
Heraclius	Shahin

Strength
20,000 (Note: Heraclius' army at the Battle of Archesh, which took place shortly after the Battle of Aghdam) to 24,000 (Note: maximum size of Heraclius army during the Heraclius Caucasus campaign)	20,000 to 30,000

Battle of Aghdam is battle between Byzantine and Sasanian armies. As a result of the battle, Shahin's army was defeated and Heraclius was able to move against Shahrvaraz's army.

== Background and Battle ==
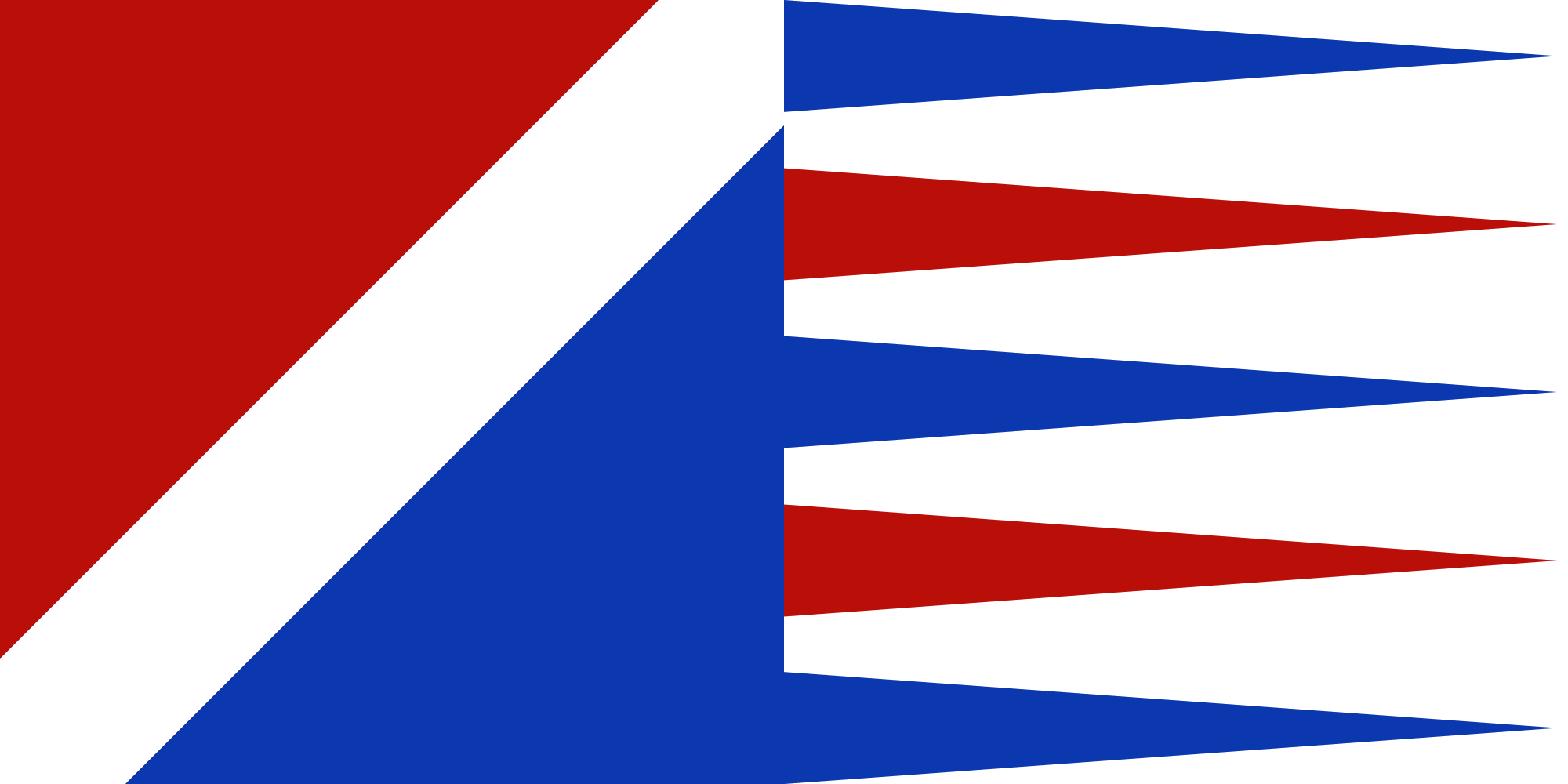
Byzantine banner in XII century

In early April 623, the Byzantines, led by Heraclius, invaded Persarmenia and defeated Khosrow's army at the Battle of Ganzak. After this victory, Heraclius moved into the depths of the Caucasus. In response to the actions of the Byzantine emperor, Khosrow sent three armies to block the actions of Heraclius. The army of Shahrvaraz moved from the Syria, and the army of Shahin moved from Chalcedon. However, the Byzantines managed to successfully retreat to the north, where they stayed for the winter. By the spring of the following year, the army of Heraclius was surrounded by three Persian armies, under the command of Shahin, Shahrvaraz and Shahraplakan. Having selected the best soldiers from his army, he abruptly moved to the west, caught Shahin's army by surprise and defeated it, and then moved to meet Shahrvaraz.

== Aftermath ==
Having defeated Shahin's army, Heraclius moved towards Shahrvaraz and defeated his army at Archesh
