= Battle of the Lycus (626) =

Battle during the Byzantine–Sasanian War of 602–628

- Part of Byzantine–Sasanian War of 602–628
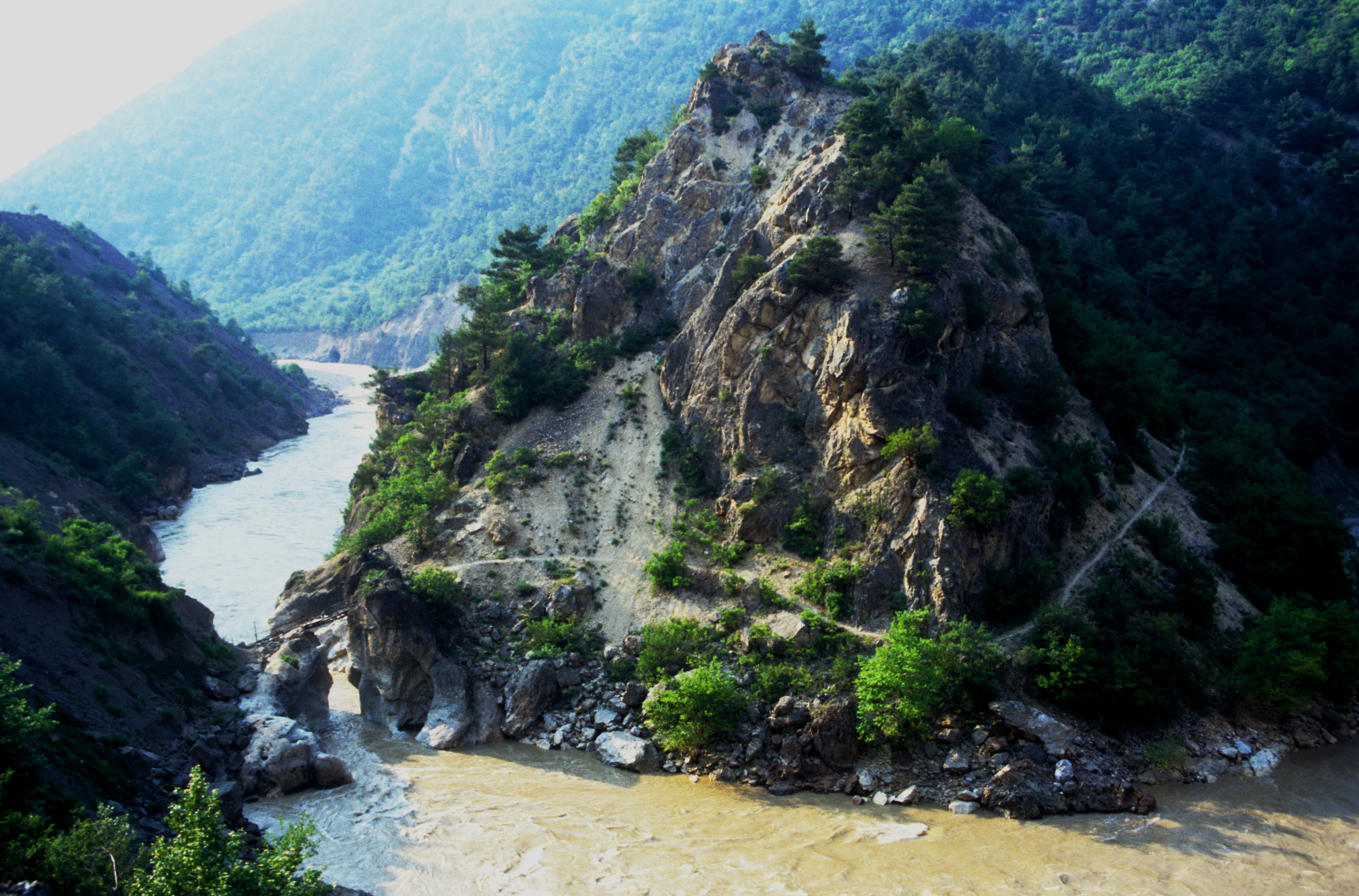
- Modern view of the Kelkit river
Date	August 626
Location	Lycus River (Anatolia)
Result	Byzantine victory

Belligerents
Byzantine Empire	Sasanian Empire

Commanders and leaders
Theodore; Heraclius (possibly)	Shahin Vahmanzadegan

Strength
Unknown but fewer than the Sasanians	50,000 or more (mostly levies)

Casualties and losses
Light	Very heavy

The Battle of the Lycus was a military engagement between Byzantine and Sasanian forces in the summer of 626. The Byzantines, led by either Emperor Heraclius or his brother Theodore, attained victory over a Sasanian army led by the general Shahin.

== Background ==
Following the successful offensives of Emperor Heraclius in the Caucasus Campaign of 624-625, the Sasanian Shahanshah Khosrow Parviz resolved to launch a new offensive against the Byzantines to regain the initiative in the conflict. Dedicating the vast resources of the Sasanian Empire, troops were levied from various satraps to form a new army named 'the Golden Spearmen', placing these under the command of the veteran general Shahin Vahmanzadegan. This army was further strengthened with a contingent of Veteran troops from the army of Shahrvaraz, supposedly 50,000 strong, though it is perhaps more likely that 50,000 represents the total strength of the army, or the strength of the "Golden Spearmen" before they were reinforced by Shahrvaraz's veterans. The strategic objective for 626 was that Sharvaraz's army would advance to the Bosphorus and assist the Avars (with whom the Sassanians had concluded an alliance), in their efforts to besiege the Byzantine capital of Constantinople, while Shahin's army would engage the Byzantine field armies in Asia Minor.

Contemporary sources claim that the Byzantine armies were divided into three, with one detachment sent to reinforce the defences at Constantinople, a larger force placed under Theodore to engage the Sasanians in the field, and a third contingent under the Emperor Heraclius to conduct an invasion of Persian-held Lazica. According to the 10th-century Chronicler Symeon Logothete, this third contingent was loaded onto ships and transported to Lazica by the Byzantine navy. Historian James Howard-Johnston challenges this narrative, arguing that had they been divided in three, the Byzantine forces would not have been sufficient in number to engage and defeat the Sasanians in the manner in which they did. He also reasons that the mention of Theodore has come about because of a connection with Saint Theodore the Recruit of Euchaita. Instead, Howard-Johnston's reconstruction of events places the army which confronted Shahin under the command of Emperor Heraclius himself and comprising the bulk of the troops available to the Byzantines at the time. Nonetheless, there is no scholarly consensus on this matter, and other historians like Warren Treadgold and Ilkka Syvänne favour the original placement of Theodore in command of the Byzantine army in this campaign due to the reference to the commander being the Brother of Heraclius in the seventh-century Greek Chronicle, Chronicon Paschale. (Note: Kaegi (p. 133) considers it possible that Heraclius played a role in the victory)

== Campaign and Battle ==
As the Sasanian force under Shahrvaraz advanced towards Chalcedon, the threat posed by Shahin's army tied up the Byzantine field army in Pontus and prevented it from interfering. Given that Shahin's force alone possessed numerical superiority, the Byzantine leadership initially opted to engage the Sasanians via strategem. The Byzantine commander feigned idleness to lull Shahin into complacency, only to conduct a surprise attack against the Persian army while it was encamped near the town of Euchaita. Though the Byzantines were not able to secure a decisive victory and capture the Sasanian camp there, this raid dealt significant casualties to Shahin's army and lowered the morale of his fighting force, most of which were inexperienced levies. Shahin responded to this setback with brutality, ordering the execution of all Byzantine captives his army had taken.

Shahin then advanced eastwards for 90 kilometres, but the Byzantine force shadowed him, managing to outpace the Persian army and arrive first at a mountain called Omphalimus to prepare an ambush. This ambush, which likely caught the Sasanians while strung out, was a great success for the Byzantines, inflicting heavy losses upon the Persians and degrading their morale further, though once more the attack failed to defeat them decisively. Shahin's army remained a large and formidable fighting force, but after the engagements at Euchaita and Omphalimus, the morale of its troops began to falter, compelling the Spahbod to initiate a withdrawal from Pontus.

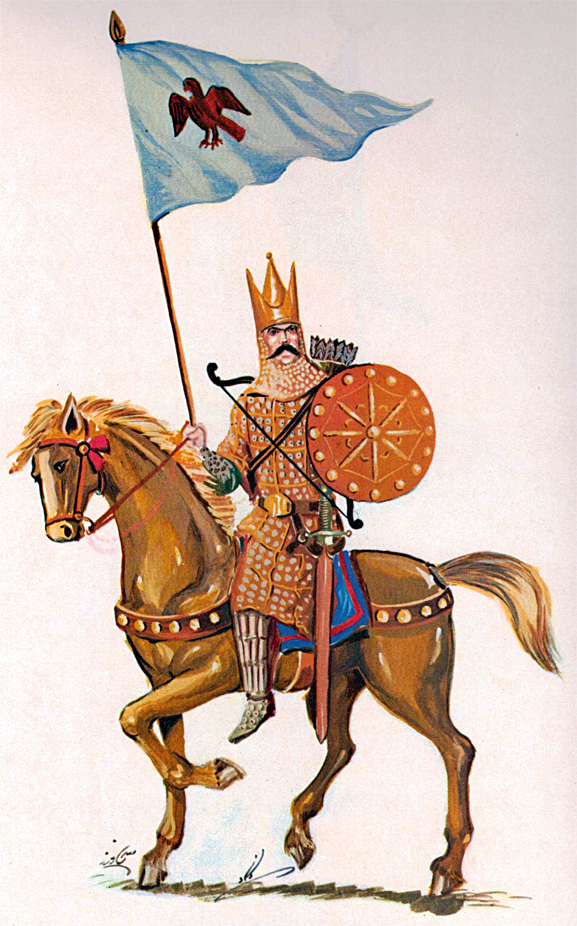
Sasanian Asbaran cavalryman

Following these preliminary encounters, Shahin's army continued eastwards for 30 kilometres, until its path was blocked by the Lycus river. The Byzantine chroniclers Theophanes and George of Pisidia recorded that in the third, final engagement the Byzantine army was assisted by divine intervention from the Theotokos, with a sudden hailstorm striking down the Persians. This may be rationalised as a legendary inflation of the important role inclement weather played in the encounter, lowering the effectiveness of the Sasanian archery and allowing the pursuing Byzantine army to attack and close the distance with the Persians, as the Strategikon advises. To negate the effectiveness of the other most dangerous component of the Sasanian army, the lance attacks of their Asbaran heavy cavalry, the Byzantines might have directed their attack against the flanks of Sasanian army to hasten the collapse of their line. Pinned against the river, the ensuing defeat was catastrophic for the Sasanians, with their army virtually annihilated save for very few survivors, including Shahin himself.

== Aftermath ==
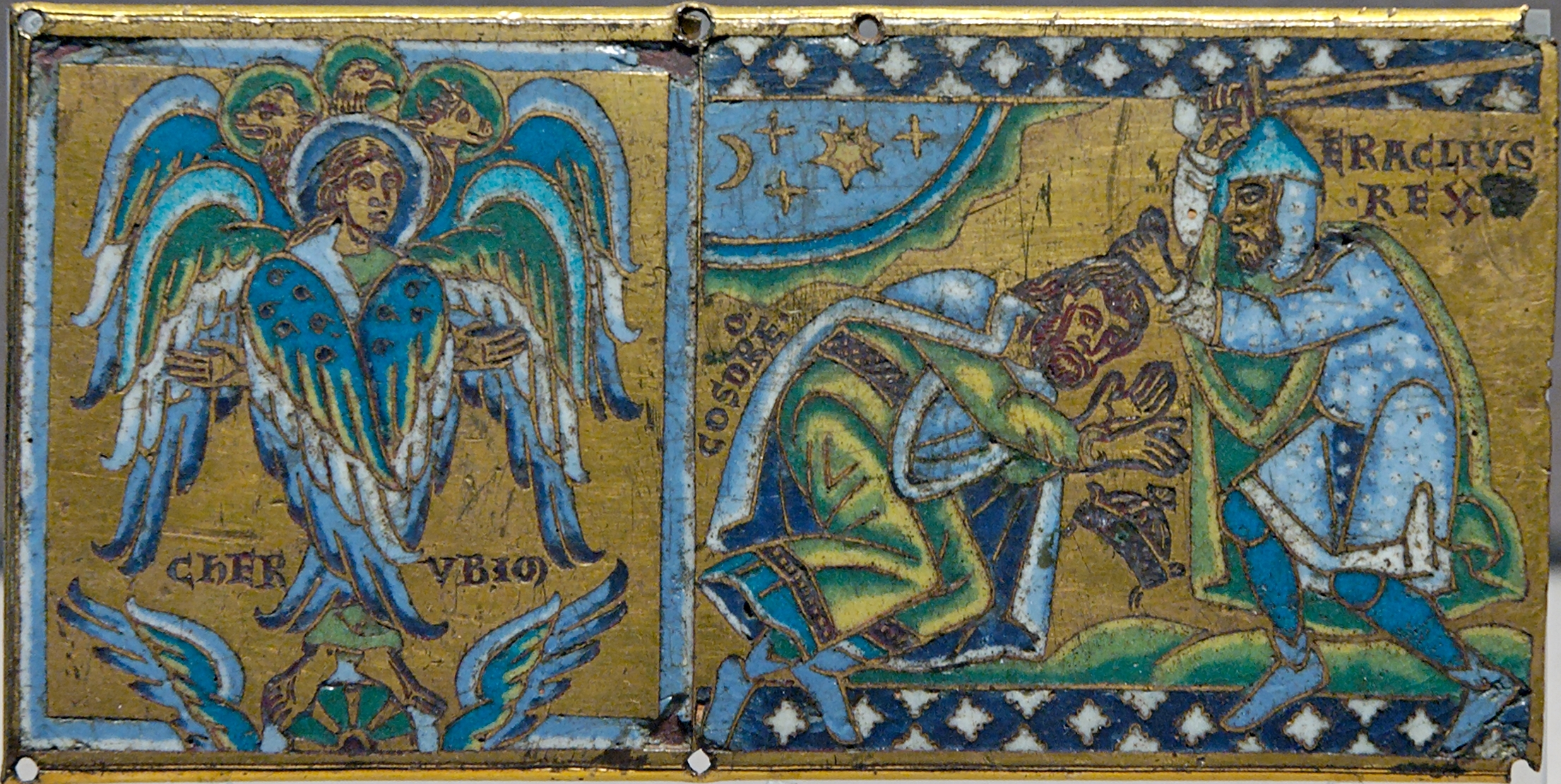
Cherub and Byzantine Emperor Heraclius receiving the submission of the Sasanian king Khosrow II. Heraclius may have participated in the Battle of Lycus in 626 before his climactic campaign of 627-628

Shahin escaped the defeat but died of unknown causes soon after (either from illness or wounds suffered in the battle). According to Theophanes, the Shahanshah Khosrow, infuriated by the disastrous defeat of his commander and the failure of his 626 offensive, ordered Shahin's corpse to be mutilated, flayed and salted, though the historian Kaegi argues this may be a misunderstanding of Zoroastrian funerary practices.

The Byzantine victory proved to be decisive for the year 626, with a significant number of the Sasanian forces in Anatolia being lost in the battle. Along with the successful defence of Constantinople, this battle ensured the failure of the last ever great Sasanian offensive into Roman territory. To make matters worse for the Persians, Khosrow had denuded his northern frontier of troops in order to muster the army given to Shahin, and with the subsequent loss of these, the Northern reaches of the Sasanian empire became vulnerable. Sensing opportunity for plunder, the Khagan of the Western Turks, who had allied with the Byzantines launched raids across the Caucasus into Sasanian Albania and Media. Thus, after this victory, achieved either by himself or his brother Theodore, Heraclius was free to conduct renewed offensives against the Sassanians, jointly besieging Tiflis (Tbilisi) in 627 alongside his allies, the Turks, before descending upon Mesopotamia late in the same year. The result of this was the major confrontation at the Battle of Nineveh, which ended in a further Byzantine victory.

== Bibliography ==
- Decker, Michael J. (2022). The Sasanian empire at War. Persia, Rome and the rise of Islam. Westholme Publishing, LLC. ISBN 978-1-59416-692-1.
- Farrokh, Kaveh (2005), Sassanian elite cavalry AD 224-642, Osprey, ISBN 978-1-84176-713-0
- Goldsworthy, Adrian (2023). Rome and Persia: The Seven Hundred Year Rivalry. Basic Books. ISBN 978-1541619968.
- Greatrex, Geoffrey; Lieu, Samuel N. C. (2002), The Roman Eastern Frontier and the Persian Wars (Part II, 363–630 AD), Routledge, ISBN 978-0-415-00342-1
- Howard-Johnston, James (2021), Heraclius: The Last Great War of Antiquity, Oxford University Press, ISBN 978-0-19-883019-1
- Kaegi, Walter Emil (2003), Heraclius: Emperor of Byzantium, Cambridge University Press, ISBN 978-0-521-81459-1
- Syvänne, Ilkka (2022). The Military History of Late Rome AD 602–641. Pen and Sword. ISBN 978-1-39907-567-1.
- Treadgold, Warren (1988). The Byzantine Revival, 780–842. Stanford, California: Stanford University Press. ISBN 978-0-8047-1462-4.
- Treadgold, Warren (1998) [1995]. Byzantium and Its Army, 284-1081. Stanford University Press. ISBN 978-0-8047-3163-8.
