= Siege of Constantinople (626) =

Part of Byzantine–Sasanian War of 602–628 & the Avar–Byzantine Wars

Avar–Persian siege of Constantinople
- Part of Byzantine–Sasanian War of 602–628 and the Avar–Byzantine Wars
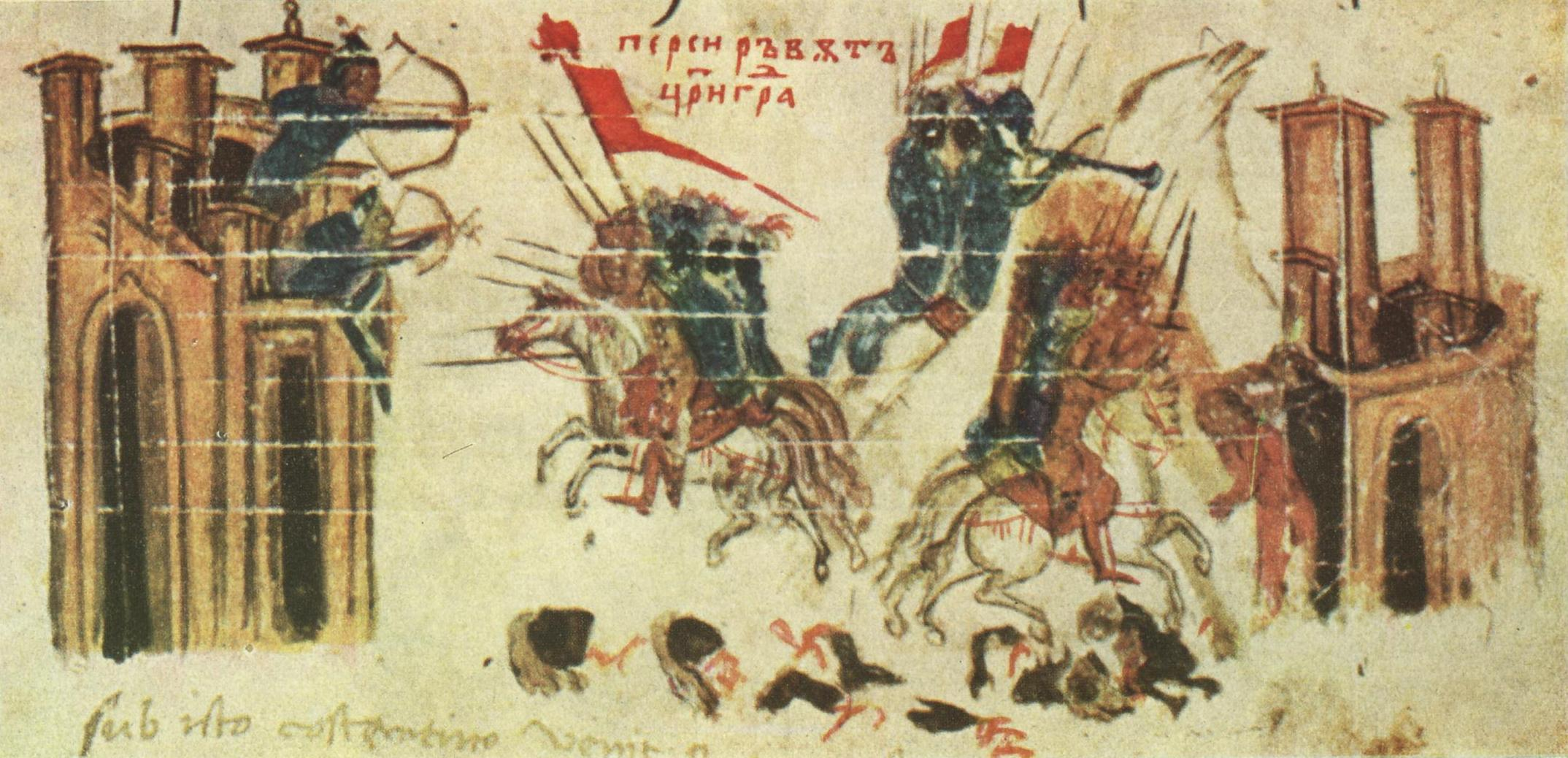
- Depiction of the siege from the Chronicle of Constantine Manasses
Date	June–July 626
Location	Constantinople, Byzantine Empire (modern-day Istanbul, Turkey) 41°00′44″N 28°58′34″E
Result	Byzantine victory
Territorial changes	The Byzantines successfully re-capture Anatolia in 626.

Belligerents
Sassanid Empire; Avar Khaganate; Sclaveni	Byzantine Empire

Commanders and leaders
Avar khagan Shahrbaraz; Kardarigan	Patriarch Sergius; Magister Bonus; Theodore

Strength
George of Pisidia: 80,000 troops; 30,000 from vanguard	Theodore Synkellos: Less than 8,000 troops, outnumbered 10+ to 1; Modern estimates: 15,000 troops; 12,000 cavalrymen; 1,000–2,000 palace guards; sailors
- Location within Istanbul Siege of Constantinople (626) (Mediterranean) Siege of Constantinople (626) (Black Sea)

The siege of Constantinople in 626 by the Sassanid Persians and Avars, aided by large numbers of allied Slavs, ended in a strategic victory for the Byzantines. The failure of the siege saved the empire from collapse, and, combined with other victories achieved by Emperor Heraclius (r. 610–641) the previous year and in 627, enabled Byzantium to regain its territories and end the destructive Roman–Persian wars by enforcing a treaty with borders status quo c. 590.

== Background ==
In 602, Phocas overthrew Emperor Maurice (r. 582–602). According to the later sources, his reign was marked by atrocities and administrative incompetence. The new emperor's mismanagement left the Byzantine Empire vulnerable and unstable when the Sassanid king Khosrau II (r. 590–628) invaded, using the coup as a pretext for war as Khosrau II was personally close to Maurice, who had helped him return to his throne after Bahram Chobin's revolt. Initially, the Sassanid invasion was successful, with the Byzantines being driven into the Anatolian heartland. Later, Phocas was overthrown by the son of the then Exarch of Carthage, Heraclius. Heraclius started active warfare and personally led his army into the battle, but the situation deteriorated and the Byzantine empire lost all its Near East possessions along with Egypt. Despite several counter-offensives into Mesopotamia, Heraclius was unable to stop his Persian enemies from laying siege to his capital where from Chalcedon they were able to launch their attack. From 14 to 15 May 626, riots in Constantinople against John Seismos (Note: It is unknown what position John Seismos held, but there is some indication that he held an important position. He may have been a city prefect.) occurred because he wanted to cancel the bread rations of the scholae or imperial guards and raise the cost of bread from 3 to 8 follis. He did this to conserve government resources, but he was removed. However, there were further disturbances in the city.

== Siege ==
Khosrau, seeing that a decisive counterattack was needed to defeat the Byzantines, recruited two new armies from all the able men, including foreigners. Shahin was entrusted with 50,000 men and stayed in Mesopotamia and Armenia to prevent Heraclius from invading Persia; a smaller army under Shahrbaraz slipped through Heraclius' flanks and bee-lined for Chalcedon across the Bosphorus from Constantinople. Khosrau also coordinated with the Khagan of the Avars so as to launch a coordinated attack on Constantinople from both European and Asiatic sides. The Persian army stationed themselves at Chalcedon, while the Avars placed themselves on the European side of Constantinople and probably destroyed the Aqueduct of Valens. Because of the Byzantine navy's control of the Bosphorus strait, however, the Persians could not send troops to the European side to aid their ally. This reduced the effectiveness of the siege, because the Persians were formidable in siege warfare. (Note: According to the Strategikon of Emperor Maurice) Furthermore, the Persians and Avars had difficulties communicating across the guarded Bosphorus—though undoubtedly, there was some communication between the two forces.

The defense of Constantinople was under the command of Patriarch Sergius and the patrician Bonus. Upon hearing the news, Heraclius split his army into three parts; although he judged that the capital was relatively safe, he still sent some reinforcements to Constantinople to boost the morale of the defenders. Another part of the army was under the command of his brother Theodore and was sent to deal with Shahin, while the third and smallest part would remain under his own control, intending to raid the Persian heartland.

On 29 June 626, a coordinated assault on the walls began. Inside the walls, some 12,000 well-trained Byzantine cavalry troops (presumably dismounted) defended the city against the forces of some 80,000 Avars and Sclaveni who were determined to remove all Roman imperial rule over Europe. However, it was only when the Avars began moving forward heavy siege equipment towards the Theodosian Walls that their intention to lay a siege became clear. Despite continuous bombardment for a month, morale was high inside the walls of Constantinople because of Patriarch Sergius' religious fervor and his processions along the wall with an icon, which could be the icon of the Virgin Mary, inspiring the belief that the Byzantines were under divine protection. Furthermore, the patriarch's cries for religious zeal among the peasantry around Constantinople was made ever more effective by the fact that they were facing heathens. Consequently, every assault became a doomed effort. When the Avar-Slavic fleet and the Persian fleet were sunk in two different naval engagements, the attackers panicked and fled, abandoning the siege, apparently under the belief that divine intervention had won the day for Byzantium.

On 7 August, a fleet of Persian rafts ferrying troops across the Bosphorus was surrounded and destroyed by Byzantine ships. The Slavs under the Avars attempted to attack the sea walls from across the Golden Horn, while the main Avar host attacked the land walls. Patrician Bonus' galleys rammed and destroyed the Slavic boats; the Avar land assault from 6 August to the 7th also failed. With the news that Theodore had decisively triumphed over Shahin (supposedly leading Shahin to die from depression), the Avars retreated to the Balkan hinterland within two days, never to seriously threaten Constantinople again. Even though the army of Shahrbaraz was still encamped at Chalcedon, the threat to Constantinople was over. In thanks for the lifting of the siege and the supposed divine protection of the Virgin Mary, a new proemium for the celebrated Akathist Hymn was written by an unknown author, possibly Patriarch Sergius or George of Pisidia.

== Aftermath ==
Map of the environs of Constantinople in Byzantine times

The loss in the siege came just after news had reached them of yet another Byzantine victory at the Battle of the Lycus, where Heraclius's brother Theodore scored well against the Persian general Shahin. Furthermore, after the emperor showed Shahrbaraz intercepted letters from Khosrau ordering the Persian general's death, the latter switched to Heraclius' side. Shahrbaraz then moved his army to northern Syria, where he could easily decide to support either Khosrau or Heraclius at a moment's notice. Still, with the neutralization of Khosrau's most skilled general, Heraclius deprived his enemy of some of his best and most experienced troops, while securing his flanks prior to his invasion of Persia. In the next year, Heraclius led an invasion into Mesopotamia once again, defeating another Persian army at Nineveh. Afterwards, he marched on to Ctesiphon, where anarchy reigned, allowing Heraclius to extract ever more favorable terms as one Persian king was overthrown by another. Eventually, the Persians were obliged to withdraw all armed forces and return Egypt, the Levant and whatever imperial territories of Mesopotamia and Armenia were in Roman hands at the time of an earlier peace treaty in c. 595. The war was over; neither the Persians nor the Byzantines would cross swords again until the Arab-Islamic invasion broke the power of both empires.

== Assessment ==
The siege of 626 failed because the Avars did not have the patience or technology to conquer the city. Though the Persians were experts in siege warfare, the walls of Constantinople proved to defend easily against the siege towers and engines, amongst the reasons being that the former could not move their siege equipment to the European side of the Bosphorus (which was heavily guarded), where their Avar and Slavic allies were initially stationed. Furthermore, the Persians and Slavs did not have a strong enough naval presence in the Mediterranean to ignore the sea walls and establish a channel of communication. The lack of supplies for the Avars eventually caused them to abandon the siege.

== See also ==
- Bonus
- Byzantine-Sassanid Wars
- Siege of Constantinople (674–678)

== Sources ==
- Anonymous (1989). Chronicon Paschale 284–628 AD. Translated with introduction and notes by Michael Whitby and Mary Whitby. Translated Texts for Historians, Volume 7. Translated by Whitby, Michael; Whitby, Mary. Liverpool University Press. ISBN 978-0-85323-096 0.
- Dodgeon, Michael H.; Lieu, Samuel N. C.; Greatrex, Geoffrey, eds. (2002). The Roman Eastern Frontier and the Persian Wars: AD 363–630 : a narrative sourcebook. Routledge. ISBN 978-0415146876.
- Ekonomou, Andrew J. (2007). Byzantine Rome and the Greek Popes: Eastern Influences on Rome and the Papacy from Gregory the Great to Zacharias, AD 590–752. Lanham, MD: Rowman & Littlefield. ISBN 978-0739119778.
- Gambero, Luigi (1999). Mary and the Fathers of the Church: The Blessed Virgin Mary in Patristic Thought. Translated by Thomas Buffer. Ignatius. ISBN 978-0898706864.
- Hurbanič, Martin (2019). The Avar Siege of Constantinople in 626: History and Legend. Palgrave Macmillan. ISBN 978-3-030-16683-0.
- Kaegi, Walter Emil (2003). Heraclius, Emperor of Byzantium. Cambridge: Cambridge University Press. ISBN 0-521-81459-6.
- Kimball, Virginia M. (2010), Liturgical Illuminations: Discovering Received Tradition in the Eastern Orthros of Feasts of the Theotokos, AuthorHouse, ISBN 978-1-449-07212-4
- Oman, Charles (1893) [2012]. "XII Heraclius and Mohammed 610–641". In Arthur Hassall (ed.). Europe 476–918. Periods of European History. Vol. Period I. Macmillan. ISBN 978-1272944186.
- Norwich, John Julius (1997). A Short History of Byzantium. Knopf. ISBN 978-0679450887.
- Treadgold, Warren (1997). A History of the Byzantine State and Society. Stanford, California: Stanford University Press. ISBN 0-8047-2630-2.
- Tsiaples, Georgios V. (2015). "Το παλίμψηστο της ιστορικής μνήμης: Η πρόσληψη της αβαροπερσικής πολιορκίας της Κωνσταντινούπολης (626) στις σύγχρονες και μεταγενέστερες ρητορικές και αγιολογικές πηγές" [The Palimpsest of Historical Memory: The Reception of the Avaropersian Siege of Constantinople (626) in Contemporary and Later Rhetorical and Hagiographical Sources] (PDF). Byzantiaka (in Greek). 32: 79–97. ISSN 1012-0513.
