= Battle of Antioch (613) =

Part of the Byzantine–Sasanian War of 602–628

- Part of the Byzantine–Sasanian War of 602–628
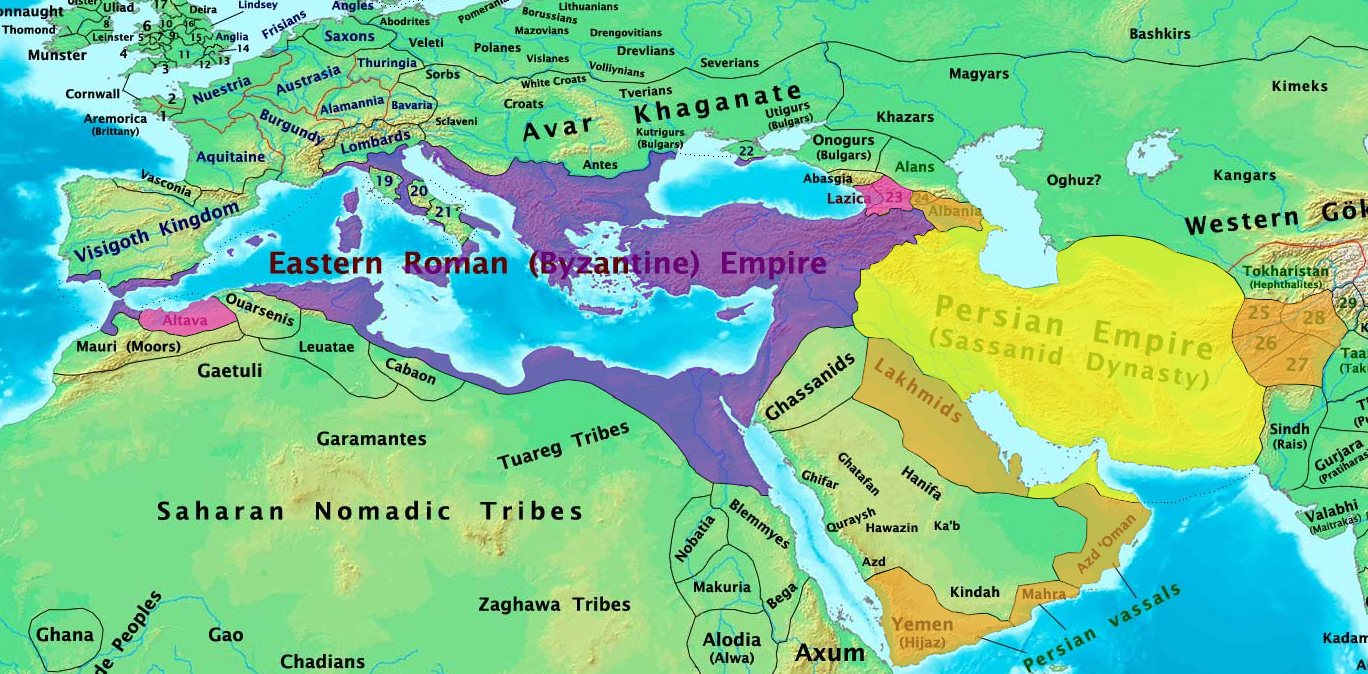
Date	613
Location	Outside Antioch, Byzantine Empire (modern Turkey)
Result	Sasanian victory
Territorial changes	Syria and Eastern Anatolia annexed by the Sasanian Empire

Belligerents
Byzantine Empire	Sasanian Empire

Commanders and leaders
Heraclius; Theodore; Nicetas	Shahrbaraz; Shahin

Strength
Unknown	40,000

Casualties and losses
Heavy: Citizens of Antioch deported	Minimal

The Battle of Antioch took place in 613 outside Antioch, Turkey between a Byzantine army led by Emperor Heraclius and a Persian Sassanid army under Generals (spahbed) Shahin and Shahrbaraz as part of the Byzantine–Sasanian War of 602–628. The victorious Persians were able to maintain a hold on the recently taken Byzantine territory. The victory paved the way for a further Sasanian advance into the Levant and Anatolia.

== History ==
Under Generals Shahrbaraz and Shahin, the Persian army conquered Byzantine-controlled territories in Mesopotamia (present-day Iraq and Kurdistan) and the Caucasus. The Byzantine Empire could not offer much resistance to the invading Persian forces, with Heraclius himself needing time to implement a number of internal initiatives to ensure he could raise the necessary funds and troops for a renewed war against Khosrow II, the Sasanian king. In the next year, continuing their success, the Persian force overran Syria and eastern Anatolia, capturing Christian cities, such as Antioch and Damascus. Ostensibly, the Persian army could not travel much further into Byzantine territory without confronting a centrally-assembled Eastern Roman army.

In response to the sudden loss of territory on the Eastern frontier, Heraclius organized a capable-sized army and marched to Antioch. However, his counter-attack was decisively defeated in 613 outside Antioch. In the set battle, the Roman positions completely collapsed and a general rout of the Byzantine army led to an easy victory for Sharbaraz and Shahin. The Maronites came from Lebanon to try and defend the city but they arrived too late so they returned to their mountains.

== Aftermath ==
The Sasanians systematically looted the city, deported its inhabitants, and slew its Patriarch. Among the wounded in the battle was Tychicus, Byzantine soldier and the future educator of the Armenian polymath Anania Shirakatsi.

The victory at Antioch ensured the Persians would maintain control of its recently overrun Byzantine territory. It was a major psychological blow to the Byzantines, and blocked the land routes from Anatolia to Palestine, Syria, and Egypt. Furthermore, the defeated army of Heraclius and Nicetas was also split in two: Heraclius and Theodore retreated north, and Nicetas retreated south. The former part unsuccessfully attempted to hold a defense line at the Cilician Gates in the Taurus Mountains, and Nicetas was not able to stop Shahrbaraz's advance into Palestine and Syria either. In the coming decade, Sassanid forces penetrated deeper into Byzantine territory. Jerusalem and all of Palestine fell to Shahrbaraz in 614, while Shahin made further inroads into central and western Anatolia, and the Persian expansion reached its pinnacle with the successful siege of Alexandria in the spring of 619, which led to the annexation of Egypt.

The Quran refers to this battle in the 30th chapter which was revealed shortly after the battle, Surat al-Rum. In it, Allah mentions that "The Romans have been defeated. In a land close by; but they will soon be victorious-Within a few years. Allah's is the command before and after; and on that day the believers shall rejoice."^{[Quran 30:2-4]} The Polytheists of Mecca made fun of the Muslims because of this Prophecy as the chances of this happening were grim. Abu Bakr made a bet with Ubay ibn Khalaf for ten camels that the prophecy would come true within three years, the bet was later revised from ten to a hundred camels and duration from three to nine years i.e. if the Romans defeated the Persians in under nine years Ubayy bin Kahlad would pay Abu Bakr a hundred camels and vice versa. Eventually, the Byzantines did defeat the Persians nine years later during Heraclius' campaign of 622, fulfilling the prophecy made in the Quran and hence Abu Bakr won, but by that time betting had been forbidden in Islam so he had to give up his gains as charity. This incident is referred by Muslims as another miracle of the Quran.

However, there is some dispute if this battle is truly the one referenced by Quran, with some scholars noting that different interpretations are given by medieval Muslim sources. For example, according to Muslim historian al-Tabari, it refers to the battle of Adhri'at in 614, while another interpretation commonly points to the Jerusalem conquest in the same year of 614. Others noted that an alternative range (i.e. the outset of seventh year, or three to five years) for the word "a few years" also exists.
