= Caucasian campaigns of Heraclius =

Campaign during Byzantine–Sasanian War of 602–628

- Part of the Byzantine–Sasanian War of 602–628
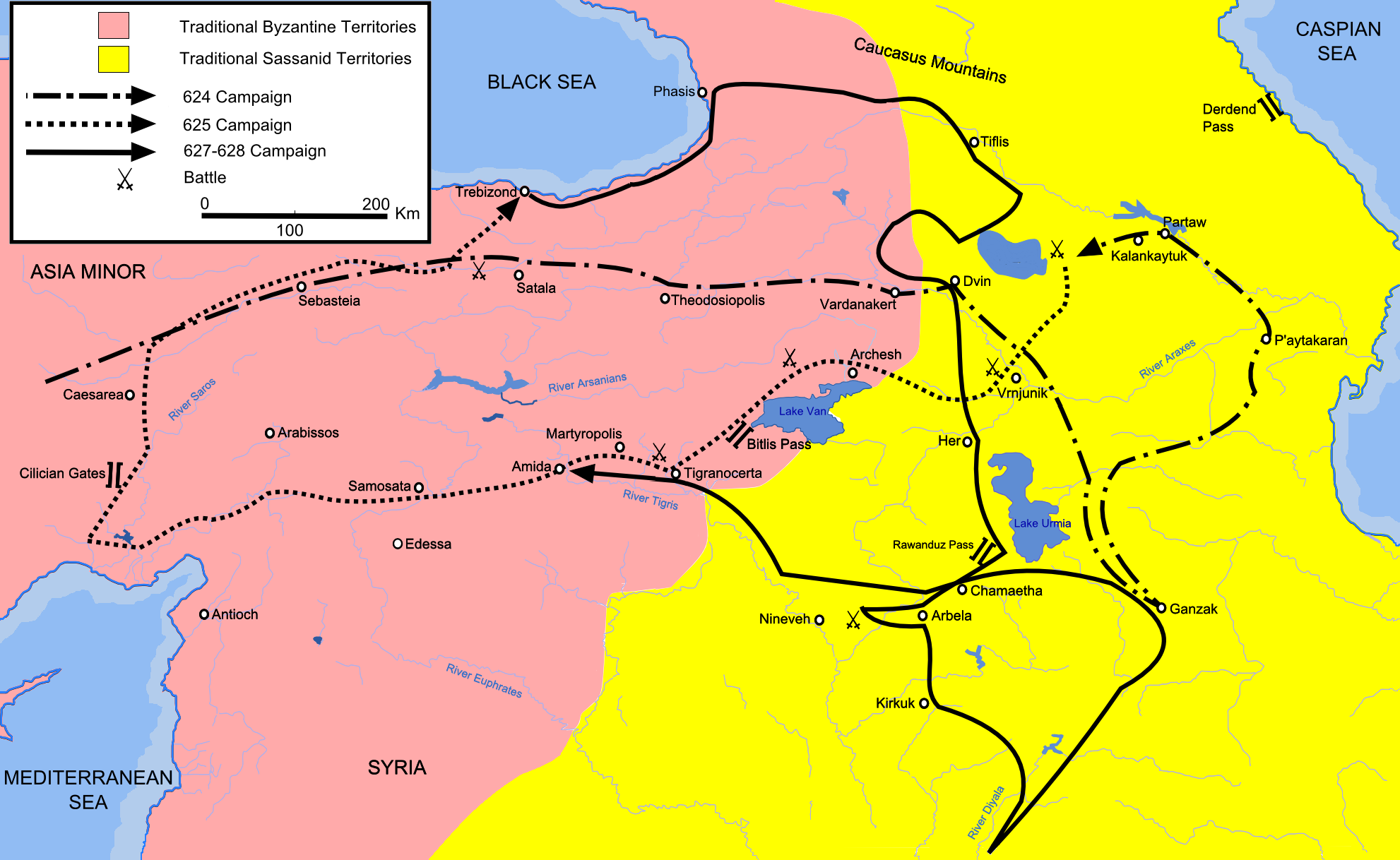
- Byzantine and Sassanian maneuvers
Date	624–628
Location	Transcaucasia
Result	Byzantine victory
Territorial changes	Byzantine forces overrun and seize control over Transcaucasia; The Sassanian Empire losses control over Iberia

Belligerents
Byzantine Empire Supported by: Western Turkic Khaganate	Sasanian Empire Supported by: Sasanian Iberia; Sasanian Armenia; Adurbadagan

Commanders and leaders
Heraclius Supported by: Böri Shad (AWOL); Tong Yabghu Qaghan (AWOL)	Khosrow II; Shahrbaraz; Shahin; Shahraplakan Supported by: Stephen I (executed)

Units involved
Byzantine army; Abasgian contingents; Iberian contingents; Lazi contingents	Sasanian army

Strength
24,000 (Note: The maximum size of the army in the Battle of Ganzak)	70,000 (Note: Two armies: the first under the command of Khosrow with 40,000, participated in the battle of Ganzak, and the second army sent in 625 under the command of Shahrabaraz with 30,000 (Note: Kaegi gives an estimate of 6,000, however, he means the detachment that participated directly in the clash, above he calls the size of the invasion army with 30,000 Kaegi 2003, p. 129))

Casualties and losses
Unknown, possibly heavy	46,000 to 70,000

The Caucasian campaigns of Heraclius (Note: Ancient Greek: Η εκστρατεία του Ηρακλή στον Καύκασο; Persian: کمپین هراکلیوس در قفقاز) were a series of military campaigns in the Caucasus conducted and led by the Byzantine Emperor Heraclius against the Sasanian Empire between 624 and 628 where Heraclius repeatedly invaded Persian territories in the broader Byzantine-Sasanian War of 602-628.

== Background ==
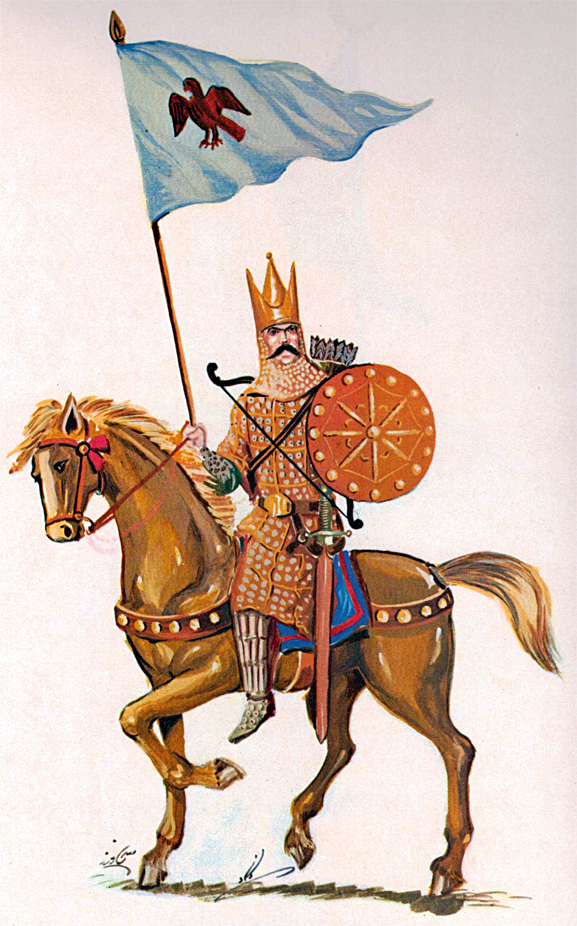
Sasanian cavalrymen

Following his previous success in Asia Minor, Byzantine Emperor Heraclius sought to conclude multiple peace agreement with Shah Khosrow II to no avail, but secured a costly peace agreement with the Avars of Pannonia in exchange for 200,000 gold solidi and valuable hostages which included his illegitimate son John Atalarichos, his nephew Stephen, the son of his sister Maria and Eutropios and the illegitimate son of the patrician Bonus John, in order to cement a treaty and secure his western flank in the Balkans. On 25 March 624, Heraclius accompanied by his second wife, Empress Martina and children from his first wife Eudokia, including the Domestikos Ananianos, departed from Constantinople and crossed into the Bosporus and reached Chalcedon. Heraclius then took the route along the Sea of Marmara and proceeded towards Nicomedia and celebrated Easter on 15 April at the vicinity of the city and eventually towards his base which was stationed at Caesarea in Cappadocia where he addressed to his soldiers of an alleged letter that he had received from Khosrow II and raised an army between 20,000 and 40,000. (Note: Some primary sources claim that he raised an army of 120,000, but modern historiography has recognized these figures as overstated.)

== Campaigns in the Caucasus ==
=== Invasion of Sassanian Armenia and Adurbadagan ===
Sassanian province of Armenia in the 6th century.

On 20 April 624, having mobilized his army, Heraclius encamped near Bathys Rhyax, and proceeded north through Theodosiopolis, Satala and Ayrarat, before further advancing eastwards via the Araxes River into Sassanian Armenia, where he sought to expand his forces by recruiting the warlike peoples of the Caucasus to gather intelligence on securing logistical and communication routes.

According to the Chronicler Theophanes the Confessor, Heraclius framed this endeavor as a struggle for the defense of Christendom, invoking religious and patriotic sentiments to inspire and bolster the morale of his troops: (Note: Later Medieval western chroniclers such as William of Tyre label Heraclius' efforts against Persia as a Crusading endorsement. However, historians like Walter Kaegi recognizes his campaigns in the Caucasus as a multidimensional conflict of which religious zeal was only one component.)

My brothers, let us keep fear of God in mind and let us struggle to avenge the divine sacrilege. Let us stand courageously against the enemy who have perpetrated so many dreadful acts against the Christians. Let us honor the independent empire of the Romans, and let us stand against the impiously armed enemy. Let us understand that we are inside Persian territory and that flight is very dangerous. Let us avenge the rapes of virgins. Having seen the mutilated members of our soldiers let us labor with our hearts. Danger is not unrequited, but the way to eternal life. Let us stand courageously, and the Lord God will help us and will destroy our enemies.

Rhetorical evocations also claim the following:

We have armed our hearts, Emperor, amplifying your mouth's praise. Your words have excited us. Your words have sharpened our swords, made them breathe. We are proud that you are our champion in battle, and we shall obey all of your orders.

=== Ganzak, Dvin, Nakhchawan, and Thebarmais ===
Around 15-25 of June 624, Heraclius descended along the route towards Horosan and inflicted considerable destruction on the Sasanian-held cities of Dvin and Nakhchawan. He then marched against the town of Ganzak upon learning that Khosrow II himself was stationed there with a large force of 40,000 men to halt the Byzantine advance. Heraclius confronted the Persians, capturing and killing the royal guards of Khosrow with the support of his loyal Arab auxiliaries, the loss of his royal guards forced Khosrow to flee at Dastagird abandoning his army to be completely dispersed and routed. (Note: Walter Kaegi believes that these Arab loyalists were likely Ghassanid auxiliaries as both the Byzantines and the Sasanians often relied on the Arabs as scouts and advance skirmishers.) After the battle, Heraclius captured Ganzak and destroyed the Zoroastrian fire temple of Ādur Gušnasp at Takht-e Soleymān to avenge the Sassanian conquest of Jerusalem, before proceeding to loot and destroy numerous towns including Thebarmais throughout the region of Adurbadagan, advancing as far as Khosrow II's residence at Gayshawan. In late November 624, Heraclius withdrew into Caucasian Albania following a division among his advisers over whether to winter in Albania or continue in pursuit of Khosrow II, the emperor chose the former and released 50,000 Persian captives for the winter, while also gathering forces for the next year.

=== Sassanian counteroffensive ===
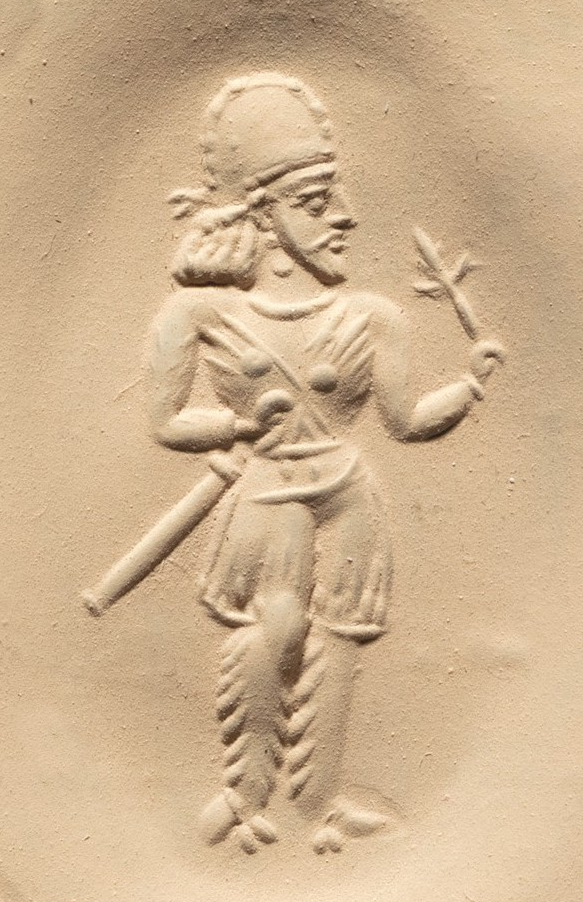
Early 4th century seal depicting a Sassanian nobleman.

Enraged by the previous setbacks, and the destruction of Ganzak, Khosrow II launched a large-scale counteroffensive and appointed his generals, the Spahbed Shahrbaraz, and Shahin Vahmanzadegan, including the Kanarang Shahraplakan to encircle Heraclius and prevent his further advance into Sasanian territory. The army was commanded by the most prominent Sassanid generals who had shown themselves in campaigns earlier. (Note: Shahin, Shahrvaraz and Shahraplakan.) At Archesh, the tired Byzantine army met the Persians, and immediately rushed into battle, but a false retreat lured the vanguard of the Byzantines into a trap and most of them died. Heraclius did not lose his head and decided to personally lead the cavalry to the attack, which even Shahrbaraz admired. This was successful and the Persians fled, almost the entire army had exterminated, Shahrbaraz himself was almost killed, he lost his entire treasury and even his harem. The Byzantines were even able to invade the north of Mesopotamia but retreated under the onslaught of Persian troops. Byzantine army was drained of blood and Heraclius was forced to postpone the invasion of Persia until the following year.

== Aftermath ==
The Byzantines won, but the war did not end there, the following year the Persians made a last attempt to attack right into the heart of Byzantium - Constantinople. He even called for the help of the Slavs and Avars, gathering an army of 80,000, but could not win, the Byzantines defeated the Slavs' fleet and the Persians were forced to give up leaving Anatolia. Seeing the successes of Heraclius, the Turks also entered the war, in the period from 627 to 628, Heraclius again won several brilliant victories, in Mesopotamia at the ancient city of Nineveh and in the siege of Tbilisi.

== Bibliography ==
- Kaegi, Walter Emil (2003), Heraclius: Emperor of Byzantium, Cambridge University Press, ISBN 978-0-521-81459-1
- Greatrex, Geoffrey (1991). The Roman Eastern Frontier and the Persian wars.Part II.363-630AD. Routledge. ISBN 0-415-14687-9.
- Decker, Michael J. (2022). The Sasanian empire at War.Persia,Rome and the rise od Islam. Westholme Publishing,LLC. ISBN 978-1-59416-692-1.
- Norwich, John (2023). The History of the Byzantine Empire: From the foundation of Constantinople to the collapse of the state. Moscow: КоЛибри. ISBN 978-5-389-19591-2.
- Ostrogorsky, George (2011) [1956]. История Византийского государства [The History of the Byzantine State] (in Russian). Moscow: Сибирская Благозвонница. ISBN 978-5-91362-458-1.
- Kulakovsky, Julian (1996). История Византии: 602-717 [The History of the Byzantine: 602-717] (in Russian). Volume 3. Moscow: Алетейя. ISBN 5-89329-005-4.
- Dashkov, Sergei (2008). Цари царей: Сасаниды [The Sassanids: Kings of Kings] (in Russian). Moscow: Сми-Азия. ISBN 978-5-91660-001-8.
- Kaldellis, Anthony (2023). The New Roman Empire: A History of Byzantium. New York: Oxford University Press. ISBN 978-0197549322.
- Treadgold, Warren (1997). A History of the Byzantine State and Society. Stanford University Press. ISBN 978-0-8047-2630-6.
