= Mihr Hormozd =

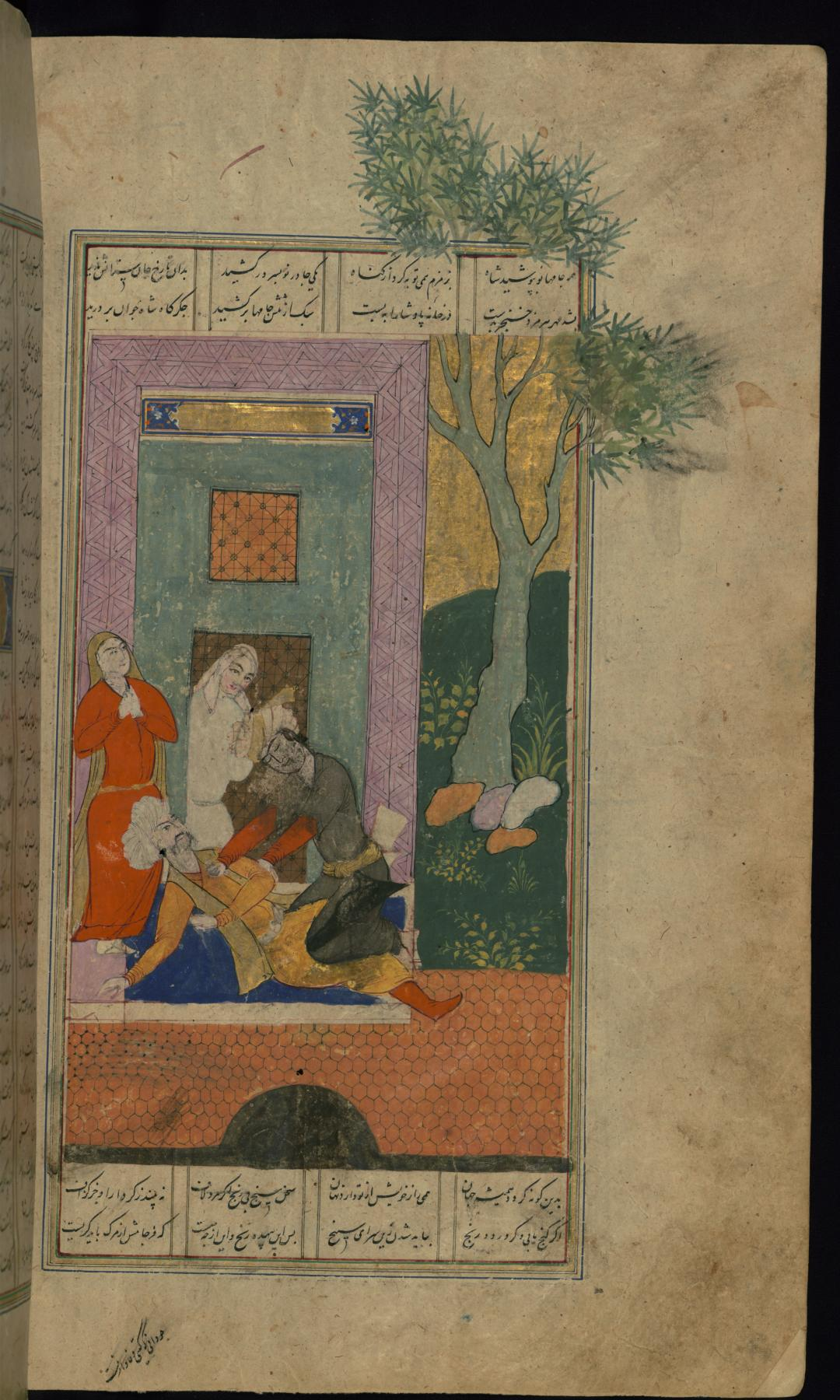
Shahnameh illustration of Mihr Hormozd killing Khosrow II.

Mihr Hormozd (Persian: مهرهرمزد, lit. 'Mihr Hurmuz') was an Iranian nobleman from the House of Suren. He was the son of Mardanshah, the padgospan of Nemroz, who was later executed by the orders of the Sasanian king Khosrau II (r. 590–628). In 628, Khosrau was overthrown by his son Kavadh II (r. 628), and was taken to prison, where shortly after he was executed by Mihr Hormozd who sought to avenge his father's death. However, after the execution, Kavadh had Mihr Hormizd killed.

== Sources ==
- Pourshariati, Parvaneh (2008). Decline and Fall of the Sasanian Empire: The Sasanian-Parthian Confederacy and the Arab Conquest of Iran. London and New York: I.B. Tauris. ISBN 978-1-84511-645-3.
- Al-Tabari, Abu Ja'far Muhammad ibn Jarir (1999). Yar-Shater, Ehsan (ed.). The History of Al-Tabari: The Sasanids, the Lakhmids, and Yemen. Trans. David Waines. Albany, NY: State University of New York Press. ISBN 0-7914-0764-0.
