= Bonus (patrician) =

Byzantine general and statesman

- Allegiance: Byzantine Empire
- Battles / wars: Avar–Persian siege of Constantinople (626)

Bonus (Ancient Greek: Βῶνος or Βόνος, died 627) was a Byzantine statesman and general, one of the closest associates of Emperor Heraclius (r. 610–641), who played a leading role in the successful defense of the imperial capital, Constantinople, during the Avar–Persian siege of 626.

== Biography ==
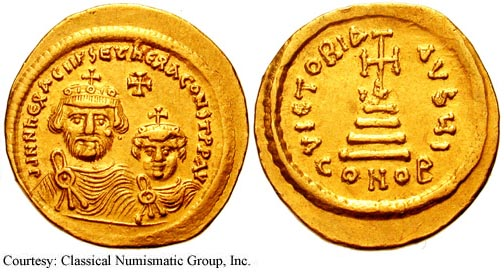
Gold solidus of Emperor Heraclius (r. 610–641). Bonus was one of his closest and most trusted aides, and served as effective regent of the Byzantine Empire during Heraclius's absences on campaign after 622 and until his death.

Almost nothing is known of Bonus's origins or private life. In a panegyric poem dedicated to Bonus in 626, George Pisides calls him a "companion in arms" of Heraclius, possibly implying that Bonus accompanied him when he sailed from Africa in 610 to overthrow Emperor Phocas (r. 602–610). He is also known to have had an illegitimate son, John, who was sent as a hostage to the Avars in 622.

At this time, the Byzantine Empire was engaged in a prolonged struggle with its large eastern antagonist, the Sassanid Persian Empire. Over the previous twenty years, Persian armies had scored victory after victory and captured most of the Byzantine Levant. In 622, after securing peace with the Avars in the Balkans, Heraclius set out to campaign in person against the Persians. Bonus was left behind in Constantinople as the Emperor's deputy and guardian of his young sons, together with Patriarch Sergius. During Heraclius's absence on campaign for the next years, Bonus acted as the effective regent of the Byzantine Empire.

The exact offices Bonus held are unclear; he held the rank of patrikios, and in the sources he is usually simply referred to as "the magistros". Although this would usually imply the position of magister officiorum, Theodore Synkellos calls him "the general" (strategos), possibly implying that he held the post of magister militum praesentalis. Modern scholarly opinion is divided between the two cases; thus the Prosopography of the Later Roman Empire and Walter Kaegi support the latter thesis, while John Haldon notably supports the former.

By 626, Heraclius had scored several victories in the East and reversed the strategic situation in his favour, but the Persian general Shahrbaraz was still encamped with his army in western Asia Minor, close to Constantinople. At this juncture, the Persians came to an understanding with the Avars, raising the prospect of a combined siege of Constantinople. To that end, the Persians advanced, took and razed Chalcedon, opposite side to Constantinople with regard to the Bosporus, and awaited the arrival of the Avars. Emperor Heraclius, having learned of the threat to his capital, decided not to return in person; instead, he sent advice and reinforcements to Bonus, who proceeded to strengthen the city walls and gather provisions.

The Avar army arrived in front of the city of Constantinople in July 626. Proposals for a surrender by the Avar khagan were rejected by Bonus, and the siege began on July 29. Bonus was the overall commander of the defenders. During the first five days of the siege, he sent repeated embassies to try to persuade the khagan to withdraw, offering money in return. On the fifth day, the Byzantine envoys encountered a Persian embassy in the khagan’s tent, a fact that underscored the danger the city would be in if the Avars' Slavic allies managed to ferry the Persian army over the Bosporus strait. Thus, on the tenth day of the siege, August 7, as the Avar assault peaked, Bonus lured the Slavs into a trap: the Byzantines had learned that the signal for the Slavic fleet to cross the strait and rendezvous with the Persian forces in Chalcedon would be the lighting of a great bonfire. Therefore, the Byzantines themselves lit a beacon in Blachernae, and as the Slavs made the crossing, the Byzantine fleet, standing by inside the Golden Horn, sallied forth and decisively defeated them.

Following this success and the repulsion of the Avars from the walls, Bonus had to restrain the over-eager people of the city, including women and children, who wanted to rush out and capture the enemy siege engines. Instead, on August 8, the Avars began withdrawing; Bonus, Patriarch Sergius, and many people came to the Golden Gate to watch their retreat and the burning of the siege towers, set on fire by the Avars themselves. The Emperor's brother, Theodore, arrived soon after at the head of an army, and took up the running of affairs in the capital. Shortly after this, in early May 627, Bonus died and was buried (on May 11) in the Monastery of St John of Stoudios.

== Cistern of Bonus ==
Bonus also built a large cistern in the city (Greek: κινστέρνα Βῶνου), covered with a domed roof, close to the site of his own house. It lay to the northeast of the Church of the Holy Apostles, in the coolest part of the city. For that reason, Emperor Romanos I Lekapenos (r. 920–944) built a palace there, the "New Palace of Bonus". Theophano, the first wife of Emperor Leo VI the Wise (r. 886–912), also built a church nearby, St. Constantine of the Cistern of Bonus, where her body was eventually transferred, probably after the sack of the city in 1204. This palace complex played a central role in the annual ritual commemoration of Constantine the Great, the city's founder, on May 21, with the imperial family moving from the palace to Constantine's mausoleum in the Holy Apostles and back again.

== Sources ==
- Dagron, Gilbert (2003). Emperor and Priest: The Imperial Office in Byzantium. Cambridge: Cambridge University Press. ISBN 978-0-521-80123-2.
- Haldon, John F. (1984). Byzantine Praetorians: An Administrative, Institutional and Social Survey of the Opsikion and Tagmata, c. 580–900. R. Habelt. ISBN 3-7749-2004-4.
- Kaegi, Walter Emil (2003). Heraclius, Emperor of Byzantium. Cambridge: Cambridge University Press. ISBN 0-521-81459-6.
- Martindale, John R., ed. (1992). The Prosopography of the Later Roman Empire: Volume III, AD 527–641. Cambridge: Cambridge University Press. ISBN 0-521-20160-8.
- van Millingen, Alexander (1899). Byzantine Constantinople: The Walls of the City and Adjoining Historical Sites. London: John Murray.
