= Theodore Synkellos =

7th century Byzantine clergyman

Theodore Synkellos (Greek: Θεόδωρος Σύγκελλος) was a Byzantine clergyman, diplomat and writer who flourished in the first half of the 7th century. He wrote in Greek.

Theodore was a high-ranking clergyman in Constantinople in the 620s. He held the post of synkellos and so acted as a liaison between the emperor and the patriarch.

Theodore delivered a sermon on the Virgin's veil on the occasion of its temporary transfer from the church of Blachernae to the Hagia Sophia when the Avars attacked the suburbs of Constantinople in 619 or 623. Theodore's authorship has sometimes been questioned, because many manuscripts leave the text anonymous, but it is generally accepted. The text was certainly written by an eyewitness. Theodore refers to the veil generically as a "garment" (ἐσθής). According to the legend he knew, it was stolen from a Jewish widow by the patricians Galbios and Kandidos and was the same garment in which Mary had nursed the infant Jesus.

According to the Chronicon Paschale, Theodore was a member of the embassy sent to the khagan of the Avars on 2 August 626, at the start of the Avar siege of Constantinople. Following the withdrawal of the Avars, he was commissioned by Patriarch Sergius to write a sermon on the siege. The sermon is anonymous in the manuscripts, but its attribution to Theodore is generally accepted. It makes full use of biblical language, especially Isaiah 7:1–9 and its account of the siege of Jerusalem during the reign of Ahaz. The sermon had a major influence on George of Pisidia's Bellum Avaricum.

== Bibliography ==
- Cameron, Averil (1979). "The Virgin's Robe: An Episode in the History of Early Seventh-century Constantinople". Byzantion. 49: 42–56.
- Carr, Annemarie Weyl (2001). "Threads of Authority: The Virgin Mary's Veil in the Middle Ages". In Stewart Gordon (ed.). Robes and Honor: The Medieval World of Investiture. Palgrave. pp. 59–94. doi:10.1007/978-1-349-61845-3. ISBN 978-1-349-61847-7.
- Howard-Johnston, James (2010). Witnesses to a World Crisis: Historians and Histories of the Middle East in the Seventh Century. Oxford University Press.
- Howard-Johnston, James (2021). The Last Great War of Antiquity. Oxford University Press.
- Hurbanič, Martin (2016). "Adversus Iudaeos in the Sermon Written by Theodore Syncellus on the Avar Siege of AD 626". Studia Ceranea. 6: 271–293. doi:10.18778/2084-140X.06.15. hdl:11089/21407. S2CID 165013551.
- Hurbanič, Martin (2019). The Avar Siege of Constantinople in 626. New Approaches to Byzantine History and Culture. Palgrave Macmillan. doi:10.1007/978-3-030-16684-7. ISBN 978-3-030-16683-0. S2CID 201014843.
- Kazhdan, Alexander (1991). "Theodore Synkellos". In Kazhdan, Alexander (ed.). The Oxford Dictionary of Byzantium. Oxford and New York: Oxford University Press. ISBN 0-19-504652-8.
- Makk, Ferenc, ed. (1975). Traduction et commentaire de l'homélie écrite probablement par Théodore le Syncelle sur le siège de Constantinople en 626. Szeged.
- Szádeczky-Kardoss, Sámuel (1975). "Préface". In Makk, Ferenc (ed.). Traduction et commentaire de l'homélie écrite probablement par Théodore le Syncelle sur le siège de Constantinople en 626. Szeged. pp. 5–8.
