= Shahin's invasion of Asia Minor (615) =

615 invasion

- Part of the Byzantine–Sasanian War of 602–628
Date	615
Location	Asia Minor (modern-day Turkey)
Result	Sasanian victory
Territorial changes	Territories east of Constantinople fell under the Sasanians

Belligerents
Byzantine Empire	Sasanian Empire

Commanders and leaders
Heraclius; Philippicus; Leontius (POW)	Shahin

In 615, during the Byzantine–Sasanian War of 602–628 with the Sasanian army under spahbod Shahin invaded Asia Minor and reached Chalcedon, across the Bosporus from Constantinople. It was at this point, according to Sebeos, that Heraclius had agreed to stand down and was about ready to become a client of the Sasanian emperor Khosrow II, allowing the Byzantine Empire to become a client state of the Sasanid Empire, as well as even allow Khosrow II to choose the emperor. The Sassanids had already captured Byzantine Syria and Palestine in the previous year. After negotiations with Byzantine Emperor Heraclius, an ambassador was sent to Sasanian Shahanshah Khosrow II, and Shahin withdrew again to Syria.

This was not the first time the Sasanians drew up their armies at the walls of Constantinople, but this time the invasion was more widespread. Beginning in 614 the Sasanians encroached on Asia Minor. In 614 they captured Melitene and Shahin divided his armies in two, one army marching to sack Sardis and Miletus and his army move towards Chalcedon. Despite the successful retreat back to Syria, the Sasanians did keep Caesarea (modern Kayseri) and the key Armenian fortresses of Theodosiopolis (modern Erzurum) and Martyropolis. According to Sebeos, when they reached Chalcedon in 615, Heraclius had agreed to stand down and allow the Byzantine Empire to become a client state, as well as even allow Khosrow II to choose the emperor.

We . . . having . . . confidence in . . . God and your majesty, have sent [to you] your slaves Olympius the most glorious former consul, the patrician and praetorian prefect, and Leontius the most glorious former consul, patrician and city prefect, and Anastasius the most God-loved presbyter [of Hagia Sophia]; we beseech that they may be received in an appropriate manner by your superabundant Might.

Heraclius sent a separate letter to Shahin, stating his willingness to accept whoever was appointed by the Sasanians as the ruler of Byzantium. These efforts were failed but the Byzantine capital was not attacked, because the Sasanians preferred to focus on Egypt, which was of higher economic value than the war-torn Anatolia.

== See also ==
- Byzantine–Sasanian War of 602–628

== Sources ==
- Dodgeon, Michael H.; Greatrex, Geoffrey; Lieu, Samuel N. C. (2002). The Roman Eastern Frontier and the Persian Wars (Part I, 226–363 AD). Routledge. pp. 196–97. ISBN 0-415-00342-3.
- Frye, R. N. (1983). "The Political History of Iran under the Sassanids". In Yarshater, Ehsan; Bailey, Harold (eds.). The Cambridge History of Iran. Cambridge University Press. ISBN 978-0-521-20092-9.
- Howard-Johnston, James (2006). East Rome, Sasanian Persia And the End of Antiquity: Historiographical And Historical Studies. Ashgate Publishing. ISBN 0-86078-992-6.
- Luttwak, Edward (2009). The Grand Strategy of the Byzantine Empire. Harvard University Press. ISBN 978-0-674-03519-5.
- Pourshariati, Parvaneh (2008). Decline and fall of the Sasanian empire: the Sasanian-Parthian confederacy and the Arab conquest of Iran. I.B. Tauris. ISBN 978-1845116453.
- Pourshariati, Parvaneh (2010). The Sasanian Era. I.B.Tauris. ISBN 978-0857711991.
