= Battle of Archesh =

Battle during Byzantine-Sasanian War of 602-628

- Part of the Byzantine–Sasanian War of 602–628 and the Heraclius Caucasus campaign
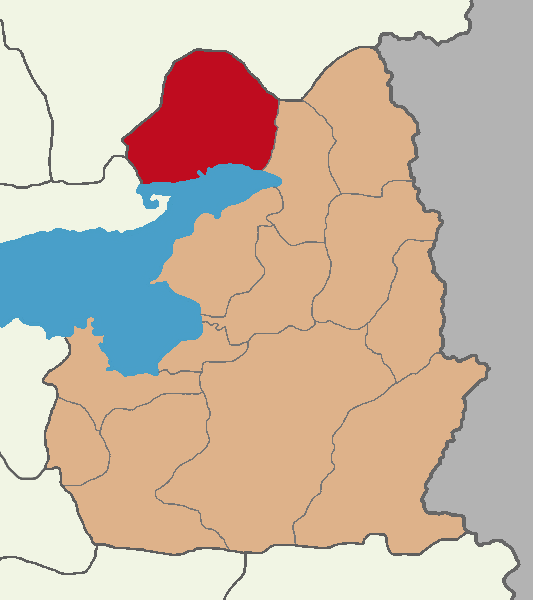
- Region of Archesh on the map
Date	February 625
Location	Northeast Coast of Lake Van, Archesh (now Turkey)
Result	Byzantine victory

Belligerents
Byzantine empire	Sasanian Empire

Commanders and leaders
Heraclius	Shahrbaraz

Strength
20,000	6,000–30,000

Casualties and losses
Unknown	Entire force

The Battle of Archesh or Battle of Van Lake was a battle between the Byzantine and Sasanian armies during the Byzantine-Sasanian War of 602-628. The battle was the final event of Heraclius Caucasus campaign, after which the Byzantine army went on the offensive deep into the territory of the Sasanian Empire.

== Background ==
During the Heraclius Caucasus campaign, after the defeat of the united Persian army of Shahin, Shahrvaraz and Shahraplakan, Heraclius moved to Persia, but Shahin and Shahrvaraz gathered the remnants of the surviving army, united and decided to give battle to Heraclius again. Having received information that the Lazi and Abasgi broke the alliance with the Romans and went home, the Persians decided to attack the army of Heraclius. After a while, the armies met and stood opposite each other until the evening, without taking any action.When evening came, the Byzantine emperor continued on his way, and the Sassanids followed him, they wanted to shorten the path, but ended up in a swampy area, thanks to which Heraclius entered Persarmenia, local residents learned about this and joined Shahrvaraz's army. With the onset of winter, the people scattered throughout their lands, which Heraclius took advantage of in the future.

== Battle ==
Heraclius started the battle at night. He divided his army and headed towards the settlement of Salbanon.There he killed almost the entire Persian army, and Shahrvaraz, leaving all his equipment, mounted a horse and fled.They took the arms of Shahrvaraz, namely his golden shield, his dagger, spear, gold belt set with precious stones, and boots. When Heraclius had taken these things, he moved against the men scattered in the villages. These men, on learning of the flight of Shahrvaraz, also fled without restraint. He pursued them, killed or captured many of them, whilst the remainder returned to Persia in disgrace. As for the emperor, he joyfully collected his army and wintered in those parts.

== Aftermath ==
After this battle, Heraclius and his army moved deep into the Sasanian empire, beginning the final stage of this war.
