= Siege of Caesarea (611–612) =

Byzantine siege of the Sasanians in Caesarea

- Part of the Byzantine–Sasanian War of 602–628
Date	611 – summer of 612 (one year)
Location	Caesarea, Byzantine Empire
Result	Indecisive
Territorial changes	Caesarea recaptured by the Byzantines

Belligerents
Sassanian Empire	Byzantine Empire

Commanders and leaders
Spahbed Shahin	magister militum Priscus

The Sasanians under general Shahin launched an invasion into Anatolia during the war of 602–628 and after Heraclius ascendency to the throne. The invasion culminated in the capture of the Cappadocian metropolis Caesarea. The year of the capture was 611 or possibly in the last days of 610.

Priscus, who had encouraged Heraclius and his father to rebel against his father-in-law, emperor Phocas, was put by the Emperor Heraclius in command of the Anatolian army in the autumn of 611. He managed to trap Shahin's forces by besieging and blockading the city. After a year, in the summer of 612, the hard-pressed Sasanians managed to escape the Byzantine blockade, much to the embarrassment of Priscus and displeasure of Heraclius, as it was widely assumed that the Sasanians are irrevocably trapped.

Heraclius had decided to visit Priscus' camp at Caesarea during winter to help with making strategies, but Priscus, now sensitive to any criticism, responded in an insulting manner, remarking that an emperor should not leave the capital to busy himself with distant military affairs. The emperor had apparently arrived in the camp in 612, after the Sasanians' escape. On the other hand, it would have been an excellent opportunity for Heraclius to remove Priscus and finally gain control over his armies.
