= Battle of Ganzak =

624 Byzantine victory over the Sasanians

- Part of the Byzantine–Sasanian War of 602–628 and the Heraclius Caucasus campaign
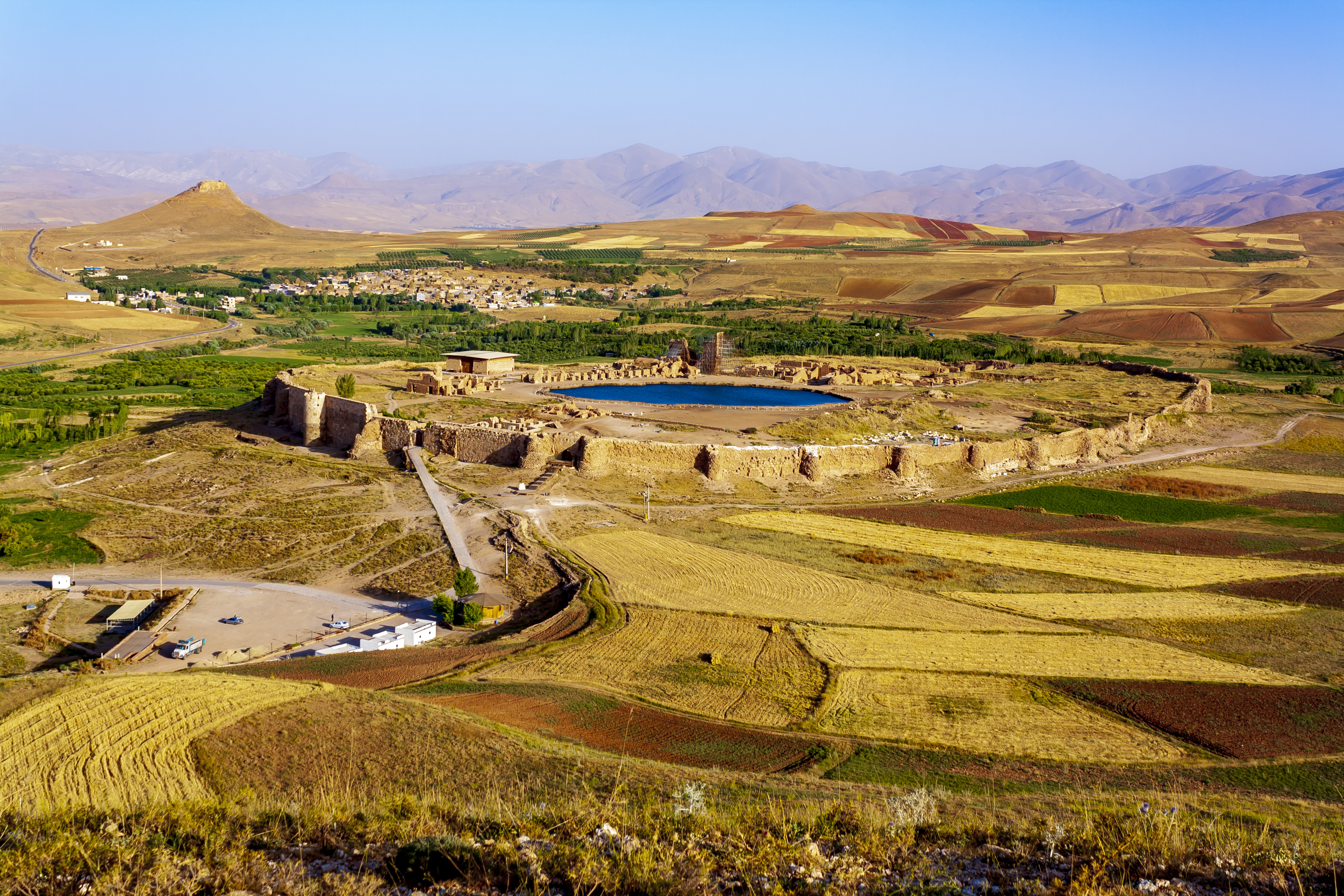
- Ganzak Fortress
Date	June 624
Location	Ganzak, Sasanian Empire (now Leylan, Iran)
Result	Byzantine victory

Belligerents
Byzantine Empire	Sasanian Empire

Commanders and leaders
Heraclius	Khosrow II

Strength
24,000	40,000

Casualties and losses
Unknown	Entire army

The Battle of Ganzak was a clash between the Byzantine and Sasanian armies. The emperors of both empires personally took part in this battle. The Persians suffered a crushing defeat, and Khosrow fled leaving his army. As a result of this, Heraclius was able to move deeper into Persia.

== Background ==
After Khosrow refused the peace treaty, sending an insulting letter in response, Heraclius marched on Caucasus, using Khosrow's letter as a tool of inspiration and propaganda for his army. Already on the way, he learned that Khosrow was with 40,000 soldiers in Ganzak.
Khosrow's letter looked like this:

Khosrow, honored among the gods, lord and king of all the earth, offspring of the great Aramazd, to Heraclius, our senseless and insignificant servant. You have not wished to submit yourself to us, but you call yourself lord and king. My treasure which is with you, you spend; my servants you defraud; and having collected an army of brigands, you give me no rest. So did I not destroy the Greeks? But you claim to trust in your God. Why did he not save Caesarea and Jerusalem, and the great Alexandria' from my hands? Do you not know that I have subjected to myself the sea and the dry land? So is it only Constantinople that I shall not be able to erase? However, I shall forgive you all your trespasses. Arise, take your wife and children and come here. I shall give you estates, vineyards, and olive-trees, whereby you may make a living. And we shall look upon you with friendship. Let not your vain hopes deceive you. For that Christ who was not able to save himself from the Jews - but they killed him by hanging him on a cross - how can the same save you from my hands? 'For if you descend into the depths of the sea,' I shall stretch out my hand and seize you. And then you will see me in a manner you will not desire.

== Battle ==
Heraclius sent the faithful Arabs forward, who defeated the guards of the Sasanian king. After this, Khosrow fled to the south, and Heraclius killed the remnants of his troops.

== Aftermath ==
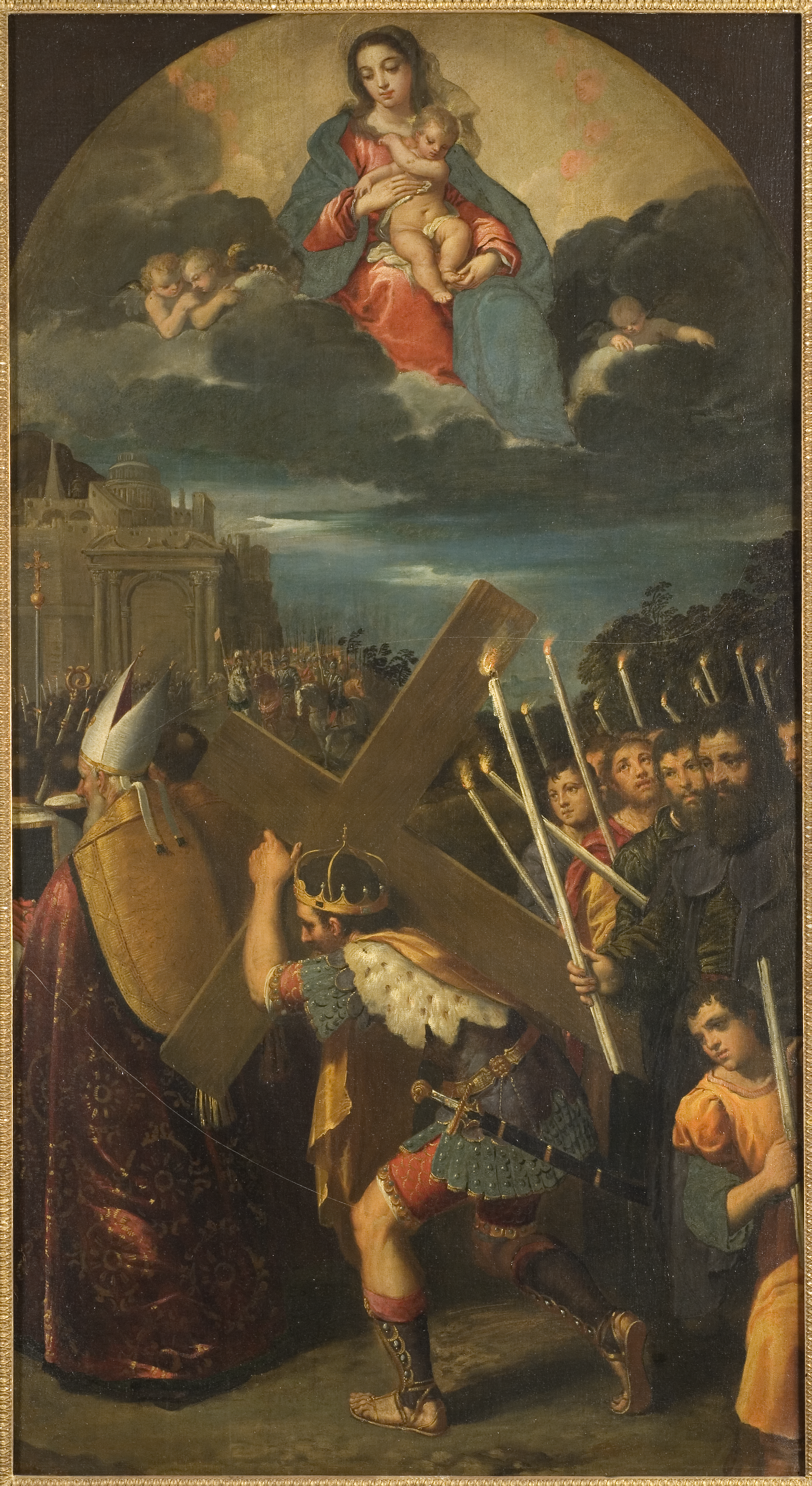
Heraclius carrying True Cross

Khosrow fled south to Dastagard, where his army finally dispersed. At this time, Heraclius took Ganzak, and after that he burned the famous temple Takht-e Soleymān. Heraclius raided the region of Atrpatakan, as far as the King's residence at Gayshawan and continued his campaign.
