= Padgospan =

Padgospan (also spelled Padghospan, Padhuspan and Baduspan) was a high-ranking office in the late Sasanian era, which functioned as the lieutenant of the Spahbed (marshal).

== Known Paygospans ==
| Name | Area | Spahbed | King | Other titles |
|---|---|---|---|---|
| Dadhi, son of Nakhirjan | "the North": Adurbadagan, Armenia and its areas, Media, Tabaristan and its regions (i.e. Gilan and Daylam) | unknown | Khosrow I | |
| Mardanshah | Nemroz (Sistan) | Shahrbaraz | Hormizd IV, Khosrow II | |
| Shahin Vahmanzadegan | Mesopotamia (Assyria) | unknown | Khosrow II | Marzban of Armenia |
| unknown ("al-Fadhusfan") | Spahan | unknown | Yazdegerd III | Ostandar, Marzban of Spahan, King (Malik) |

== Sources ==
- Marciak, Michał (2017). Sophene, Gordyene, and Adiabene: Three Regna Minora of Northern Mesopotamia Between East and West. BRILL. ISBN 978-90-04-35072-4.
- Morony, Michael G. (2005) [1984]. Iraq After The Muslim Conquest. Gorgias Press LLC. ISBN 978-1-59333-315-7.
- Pourshariati, Parvaneh (2008). Decline and Fall of the Sasanian Empire: The Sasanian-Parthian Confederacy and the Arab Conquest of Iran. London and New York: I.B. Tauris. ISBN 978-1-84511-645-3.
