= Theodore (brother of Heraclius) =

7th century Byzantine official and general

Theodore (Latin: Theodorus, Greek: Θεόδωρος, romanized: Theodōros; fl. c. 610 – 636) was the brother (or half-brother) of the Byzantine emperor Heraclius (r. 610–641), a curopalates and leading general in Heraclius' wars against the Persians and against the Muslim conquest of the Levant.

== Life ==
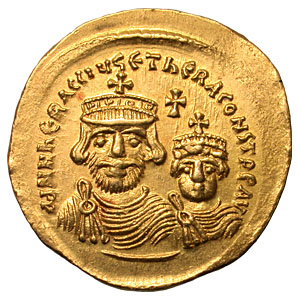
Gold solidus of Heraclius with his son, Heraclius Constantine (Heraclonas)

He was the son of the general and exarch of Africa Heraclius the Elder, and is usually regarded as the brother (although John of Nikiu suggests him to be the half-brother) of Heraclius. Soon after Heraclius' overthrow of the emperor Phocas (r. 602–610), Theodore was appointed to the crucial post of curopalates, controlling the palace administration, which at the time was ranked second in importance only to the imperial office itself.

In 612, after the deposition and imprisonment of the magister militum per Orientem Priscus, command of his troops was assumed by Theodore and Philippicus. In late 613, Theodore accompanied his brother in a campaign against the Sasanid Persians near Antioch. Although initially successful, the Byzantines were defeated and most of Cilicia conquered by the Persians.

Theodore reappears in 626, when he was sent with part of Heraclius' army against the forces of the Persian general Shahin. Theodore heavily defeated Shahin at the Lycus in northeastern Anatolia, and then reportedly sailed to Constantinople, which was being besieged by the Avar-Sasanian forces. By the time he arrived, the siege was effectively at an end, but he engaged in negotiations with the Avar khagan. After conclusion of peace with Kavad II in 628, Theodore was sent as his brother's envoy to organize the Persian withdrawal from Syria and northern Mesopotamia. According to the chroniclers, the Persian garrisons were reluctant to leave, despite his bearing letters from Kavadh. This was especially the case at Edessa in 629/630, where the local Jewish community allegedly encouraged the Persians to stay; the Byzantines had to set up siege machines and begin bombarding the city before the Persians agreed to withdraw. When Theodore's troops entered the city, they began attacking and killing the Jews, until Heraclius, petitioned by a Jew who managed to escape, sent an order to stop this.

Theodore was left by Heraclius as his virtual viceroy in the East, and entrusted with the command of Byzantine forces and the restoration of imperial authority there. In this capacity, Theodore faced the first Muslim attacks on the Byzantine provinces. He seems to have underestimated the threat (he reportedly referred to the Arabs as "dead dogs"), and was unable to counter their raids. He was probably the Byzantine commander at the Battle of Mu'ta in 629, the first major encounter of the Muslim Arabs and the Byzantines. In 634, he led his forces from Mesopotamia to Syria, where he apparently suffered a heavy defeat at a battle near Gabitha (perhaps the Battle of Ajnadayn on 30 July, although other sources indicate that he was defeated in October). Thereafter he retreated to Edessa or Antioch, joining Heraclius. During the Byzantine counteroffensive of 636, he re-occupied Emesa and Damascus, which had been abandoned by the Muslims. He most likely did not participate in the final Battle of Yarmouk on 20 August 636, contrary to the reports of Muslim sources (which also record that he was killed there).

Instead, his failure to counter the Muslim expeditions caused a rift in his relations with Heraclius; and Theodore allegedly criticized his brother's controversial marriage to his niece Martina. In response, Heraclius recalled Theodore to Constantinople and ordered his son Heraclonas to publicly humiliate and imprison him. This humiliation caused Theodore's son, also named Theodore, to participate in the abortive plot of John Athalarichos to overthrow Heraclius in 637. Theodore's other son, Gregory, is only mentioned in 649, in the dependents of Theophilus of Edessa, such as Theophanes the Confessor. Theophanes mentions that Gregory served as a hostage in the court of Mu'awiya I (r. 661–680) as part of the terms for the treaty Constans II (r. 641–668) negotiated with the caliph, but the treaty collapsed in 651 when Gregory died at Helioupolis.

== Sources ==
- Charles, Robert H. (2007) [1916]. The Chronicle of John, Bishop of Nikiu: Translated from Zotenberg's Ethiopic Text. Merchantville, NJ: Evolution Publishing. ISBN 9781889758879.
- Greatrex, Geoffrey; Lieu, Samuel N. C. (2002), The Roman Eastern Frontier and the Persian Wars (Part II, 363–630 AD), Routledge, ISBN 0-415-14687-9
- Kaegi, Walter Emil (2003), Heraclius: emperor of Byzantium, Cambridge University Press, ISBN 0-521-81459-6
- Kazhdan, Alexander, ed. (1991), Oxford Dictionary of Byzantium, Oxford University Press, ISBN 978-0-19-504652-6
- Martindale, John R.; Jones, A.H.M.; Morris, John (1992), The Prosopography of the Later Roman Empire, Volume III: AD 527–641, Cambridge University Press, ISBN 0-521-20160-8
- Ostrogorsky, George (1956). History of the Byzantine State. Oxford: Basil Blackwell.
- Mango, Cyril (1997). The Chronicle of Theophanes Confessor. New York: Oxford University Press. ISBN 978-0-19-822568-3.
