= Shahin Vahmanzadegan =

Sasanian general (died 626)

- Born: Unknown; Sasanian Empire
- Died: 626; Transcaucasus
- Military career
- Allegiance: Sasanian Empire
- Branch: Sasanian army
- Service years: 590–626
- Rank: Padgospan of the West (Governor of Asōrestān); Marzban of Armenia
- Commands: The New Army
- Conflicts: Byzantine–Sasanian War of 602–628: Battle of Theodosiopolis (607); Invasion of Anatolia (611); Siege of Caesarea (611–612); Battle of Antioch (613); Battle of the Cilician Gates (613); Shahin's invasion of Asia Minor (615); Heraclius' campaign of 622; Battle of Archesh; Heraclius Caucasus campaign; Battle of the Lycus

Shahen or Shahin (Middle Persian: Shāhēn Vahūmanzādagān, in Greek sources: Σαὴν; died c. 626) was a senior Sasanian general (spahbed) during the reign of Khosrow II (590–628). He was a member of the House of Spandiyadh.

== Biography ==
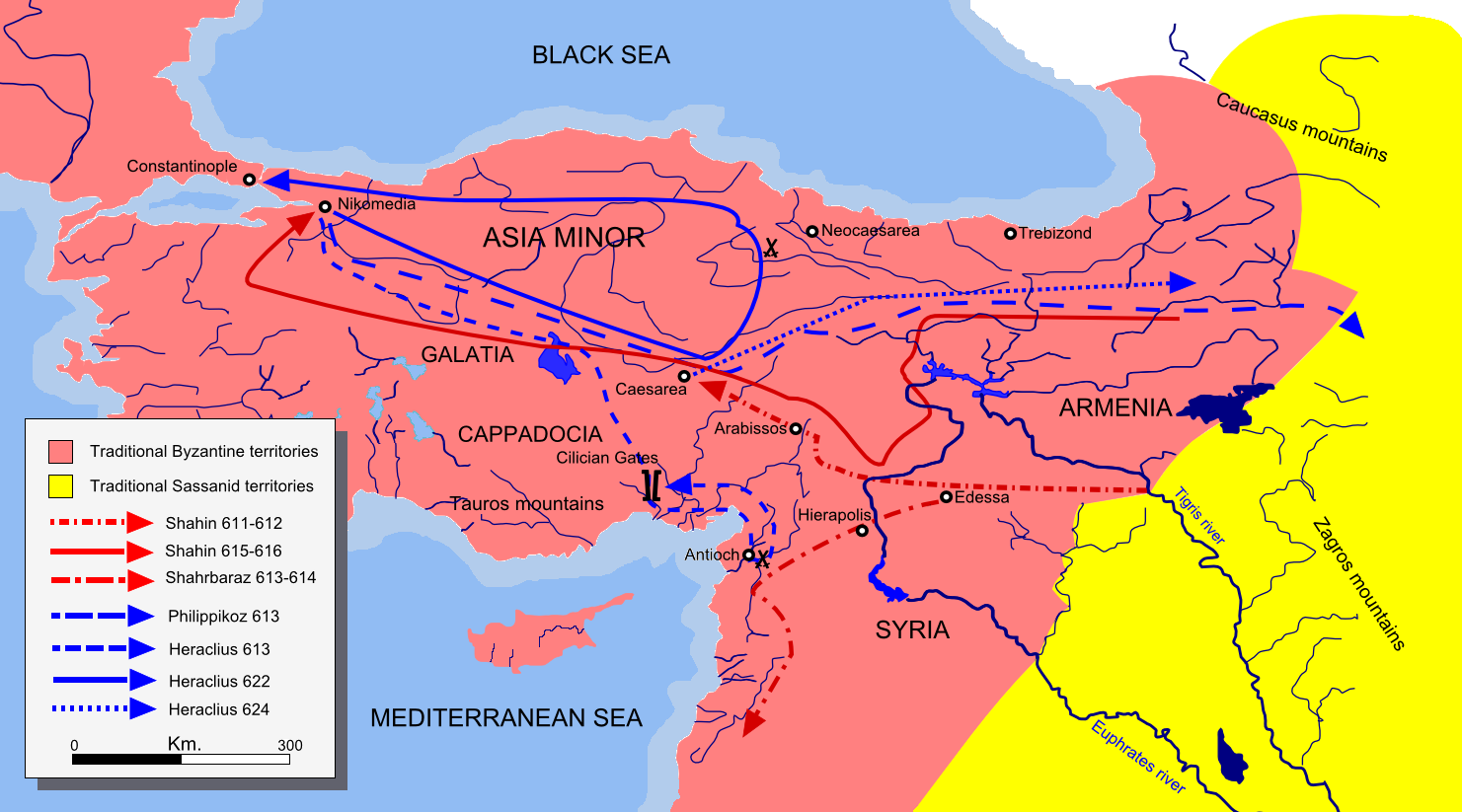
Campaign map from 611 to 624 through Syria, Anatolia, Armenia, and Mesopotamia

Shahin is first mentioned in 602, after the outbreak of the Byzantine–Sasanian War of 602–628, where he commanded the forces invading Byzantine territory in the Transcaucasia, winning a battle against Domentziolus near Theodosiopolis in 607/8. Following the expulsion of Roman forces from that region, in 611 Shahin led an advance into Anatolia, capturing Caesarea. There, Phocas' son-in-law Priscus, started a year-long siege to trap them inside the city. However, Shahin's troops unexpectedly escaped Priscus' blockade and burned Caesarea, much to Prisucs' embarrassment and Heraclius' displeasure. In 613 the Roman offensive pressed on into Syria, but the combined Persian armies under Shahin and Shahrbaraz crushingly defeated Heraclius near Antioch. After this victory the Persians looted the city, slew the Patriarch of Antioch and deported many citizens. Roman forces lost again while attempting to defend the area just to the north of Antioch at the Cilician Gates, despite some initial success. The Persians then captured Tarsus and the Cilician plain. This defeat cut the Byzantine empire in half, severing Constantinople and Anatolia's land link to Syria, Palestine, Egypt, and the Exarchate of Carthage.

In 614 Shahin was able to campaign all the way across Anatolia to Chalcedon on the shore of the Bosphoros opposite Constantinople. On the shore of Chalcedon, Heraclius held a conference with Shahin, who, before Heraclius descended from his galley, saluted with reverence and pity the majesty of the purple. The friendly offer of Shahin to conduct an embassy to the presence of the great king, was accepted with the warmest gratitude, and the prayer for pardon and peace was humbly presented by the praetorian prefect, the prefect of the city, and one of the first ecclesiastics of the patriarchal church. But the lieutenant of Chosroes had fatally mistaken the intentions of his master:

It was not an embassy, it was the person of Heraclius, bound in chains, that he should have brought to the foot of my throne. I will never give peace to the emperor of Rome, till he had abjured his crucified God, and embraced the worship of the sun.

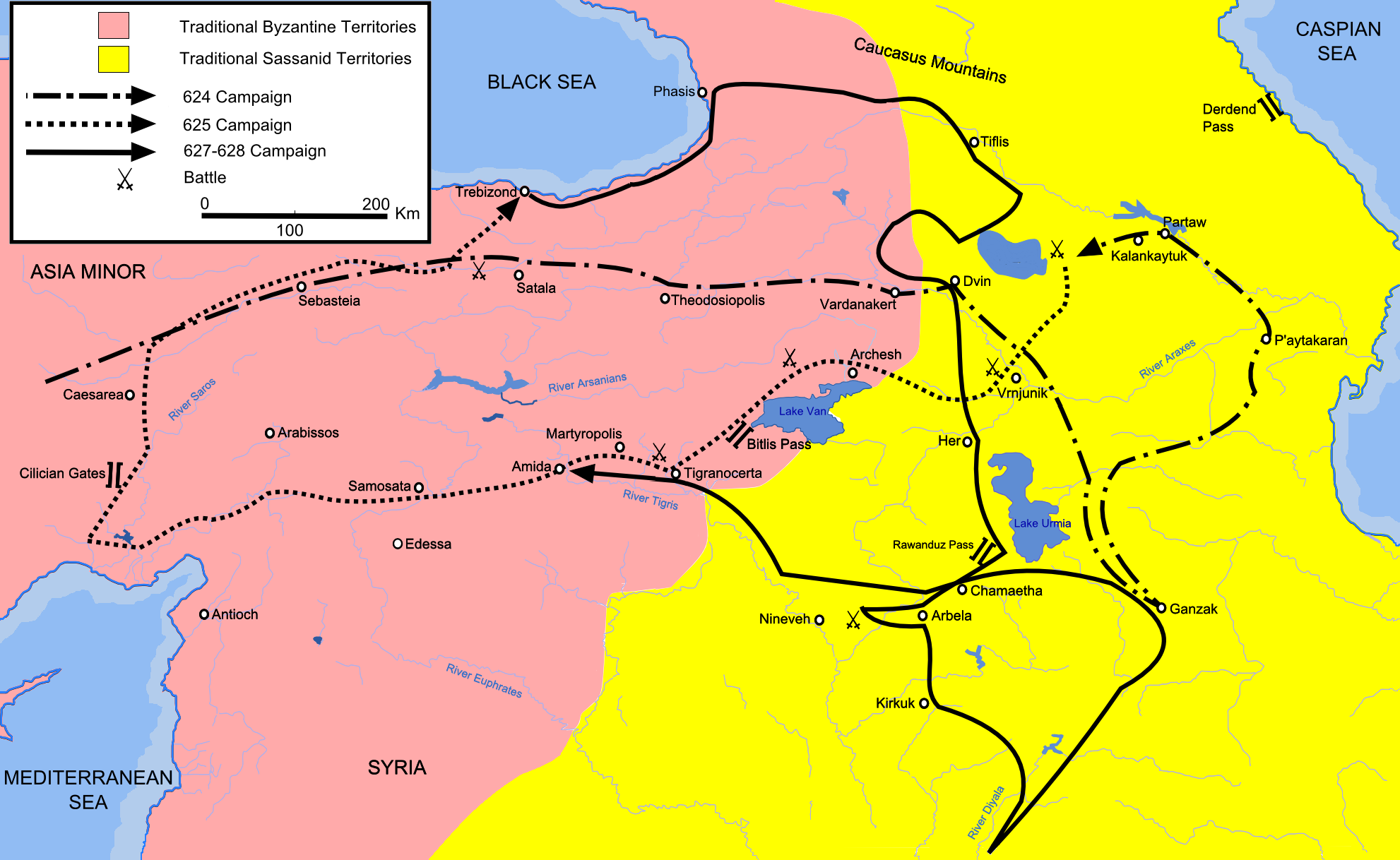
Campaign map of Heraclius in 624, 625, and 627–628 through Armenia, Anatolia, and Mesopotamia

According to the history of the Patriarch Nicephorus, Shahin, for his presumption, was flayed alive and his skin was used to make a bag. However this is inconsistent with the account of Theophanes the Confessor, who claims that Shahin fought against Byzantine forces in the following years.

Despite overwhelming Persian successes spanning almost two decades of war, from 622 Heraclius led a fresh counter-offensive in the Transcaucasus which brought about a remarkable revival of Byzantine fortunes. By 624, Heraclius wintered in Caucasian Albania, gathering forces for the next year. Khosrau was not content to let Heraclius quietly rest in Albania. He sent three armies, commanded by Shahin, Shahrbaraz, and Shahraplakan, to try to trap and destroy Heraclius' forces. Shahraplakan retook lands up as far as Siwnik, aiming to capture the mountain passes. Shahrbaraz was sent to block Heraclius' retreat through Caucasian Iberia, and Shahin was sent to block the Bitlis Pass. Heraclius, planning to engage the Persian armies separately, spoke to his worried Lazic, Abasgian, and Iberian allies and soldiers, saying: "Do not let the number of our enemies disturb us. For, God willing, one will pursue ten thousand."

Two soldiers who feigned desertion were sent to Shahrbaraz, claiming that the Byzantines were fleeing before Shahin. Due to jealousy between the Persian commanders, Shahrbaraz hurried with his army to take part in the glory of the victory. Heraclius met them at Tigranakert and routed the forces of Shahraplakan and Shahin one after the other. Shahin lost his baggage train, and Shahraplakan (according to one source) was killed, though he re-appears later. After this victory, Heraclius crossed the Araxes and camped in the plains on the other side. Shahin, with the remnants of both his and Shahraplakan's armies joined Shahrbaraz in the pursuit of Heraclius, but marshes slowed them down. At Aliovit, Shahrbaraz split his forces, sending some 6,000 troops to ambush Heraclius while the remainder of the troops stayed at Aliovit. Heraclius instead launched a surprise night attack on the Persian main camp in February 625, destroying it. Shahrbaraz only barely escaped, naked and alone, having lost his harem, baggage, and men.

== Death ==
Shahin then regrouped with Shahrbaraz, shadowing Heraclius through Armenia in an inconclusive campaign for the remainder of that year. In 626 Khosrau ordered an exceptional levy of troops from across his empire to revive the faltering war effort. Shahin was put in charge of these new recruits, called the New Army, together with a large number of veterans, and sent against Heraclius, but was heavily defeated by the emperor's brother Theodore at the Battle of the Lycus. The dejected Shahin fell ill and Khosrau, enraged at Shahin's failure, mistreated the general's corpse, which had been sent to him preserved in salt.

== Sources ==
- Dodgeon, Michael H.; Greatrex, Geoffrey; Lieu, Samuel N. C. (2002). The Roman Eastern Frontier and the Persian Wars (Part II, 363-630 AD). Routledge. ISBN 978-0-415-00342-1.
- Foss, Clive (1975). "The Persians in Asia Minor and the end of antiquity". The English Historical Review. 90 (357): 721–747. doi:10.1093/ehr/XC.CCCLVII.721. JSTOR 567292.
- Edward Gibbon, The History of the Decline and Fall of the Roman Empire, chapter 46
- Geoffrey Greatrex, Samuel N. C. Lieu, The Roman Eastern Frontier and the Persian Wars, (Part II, 363–630) (London 2002)
- Kaegi, Walter E. (2003). Heraclius: Emperor of Byzantium. Cambridge University Press. ISBN 0-521-81459-6.
- Virasp Mehta, Causes of the Downfall of the Sassanian Empire (Palo Alto 2007)
- Pourshariati, Parvaneh (2008). Decline and Fall of the Sasanian Empire: The Sasanian-Parthian Confederacy and the Arab Conquest of Iran. London and New York: I.B. Tauris. ISBN 978-1-84511-645-3.
- Theophanes the Confessor, The Chronicle of Theophanes — Anni mundi 6095–6305 (A.D. 602–813), ed. Harry Turtledove (Philadelphia 1982)
