= Heraclius' Anatolian campaign =

Byzantine military campaign

Heraclius' campaign of 622
- Part of the Byzantine–Sasanian War of 602–628
Date	622
Location	Cappadocia (present day Turkey)
Result	Byzantine victory

Belligerents
Byzantine Empire	Sassanid Empire

Commanders and leaders
Heraclius	Shahrbaraz

Strength
Unknown	Unknown

Heraclius' campaign of 622, erroneously also known as the Battle of Issus, was a major campaign in the Byzantine–Sasanian War of 602–628 by emperor Heraclius that culminated in a crushing Byzantine victory in Anatolia.

In 622, the Byzantine emperor Heraclius, was ready to mount a counter-offensive against the Sassanids who had overrun most of the eastern provinces of the Byzantine Empire. He left Constantinople the day after celebrating Easter on Sunday, 4 April 622. His young son, Heraclius Constantine, was left behind as regent under the charge of Patriarch Sergius and the patrician Bonus. In order to threaten both the Persian forces in Anatolia and Syria, his first move was to sail from Constantinople to Pylae in Bithynia. He spent the summer training so as to improve the skills of his men and his own generalship. In the autumn, Heraclius threatened the Persian communications to Anatolia from the Euphrates valley by marching to northern Cappadocia. This forced the Persian forces in Anatolia under Shahrbaraz to retreat from the front-lines of Bithynia and Galatia to eastern Anatolia in order to block his access to Persia.

What followed next is not entirely clear, but Heraclius certainly won a crushing victory over Shahrbaraz somewhere in Cappadocia. The key factor was Heraclius' discovery of hidden Persian forces in ambush and responding to this ambush by feigning retreat during the battle. The Persians left their cover to chase the Byzantines, whereupon Heraclius' elite Optimatoi assaulted the chasing Persians, causing them to flee. Thus, he saved Anatolia from the Persians. However, Heraclius had to return to Constantinople to deal with the threat posed to his Balkan domains by the Avars, and left his army to winter in Pontus.

== Bibliography ==
- Kaegi, Walter Emil (1995) [1992], Byzantium and the early Islamic conquests, Cambridge University Press, ISBN 0521484553.
- Kaegi, Walter Emil (2003), Heraclius: Emperor of Byzantium, Cambridge University Press, ISBN 0521814596.
