= Shahraplakan =

Shahraplakan (Old Armenian: Շահրապղական, romanized: Šahrapłakan), rendered Sarablangas (Σαραβλαγγᾶς) in Greek sources, was a Sassanid Persian general (spahbed) who participated in the Byzantine–Sasanian War of 602–628 and the Third Perso-Turkic War.

== Biography ==
Shahraplakan first appears in 624, when the Persian shah Khosrow II (r. 590–628) entrusted him with the command of the so-called "New Army", composed of the regiments of Khosroēgetai and Perozitai according to Theophanes the Confessor. With this army, Shahraplakan was to counter the Byzantine emperor Heraclius (r. 610–641), who had invaded Persarmenia and was wintering in Caucasian Albania. Shahraplakan's army was successful in recovering many towns and driving the Byzantines back to the Siwnik area, and sought to capture key passes so as to prevent Heraclius from descending south into northwestern Persia (Adurbadagan). Heraclius, however, managed to avoid encirclement through a series of maneuvers. Shahraplakan followed him but did not engage him, hoping first to join with the army led by another Persian general, Shahrbaraz. Although Heraclius launched several sorties against Shahraplakan to prevent this, the two Persian armies eventually joined. Encouraged by reports from Byzantine deserters, the two Persian generals decided not to await the arrival of a third army under their rival Shahin, but to attack Heraclius. In the battle that followed, the Sassanid Persians were defeated.

One source records that Shahraplakan was killed in that battle ("struck by a sword in his back"), but he re-appears later. In 627, he was sent with a force of about 1,000 elite men to the relief of Tiflis, then being besieged by the Byzantines and their "Khazar" (in reality probably Gökturk) allies. Their arrival reinforced the garrison and gave heart to the defenders, but the city eventually fell (probably in late 628). As the siege dragged on, however, in mid-September 627 Heraclius left the Turks to continue the siege, while he with his army and a large Turkic contingent turned south towards Persia. Shahraplakan, with his much smaller force, could do nothing to prevent the Byzantine emperor's advance.

== Sources ==
- Greatrex, Geoffrey; Lieu, Samuel N. C. (2002). The Roman Eastern Frontier and the Persian Wars (Part II, 363–630 AD). New York, New York and London, United Kingdom: Routledge (Taylor & Francis). ISBN 0-415-14687-9.
- Kaegi, Walter Emil (2003). Heraclius, Emperor of Byzantium. Cambridge, United Kingdom: Cambridge University Press. ISBN 0-521-81459-6.
- Martindale, John R., ed. (1992). The Prosopography of the Later Roman Empire: Volume III, AD 527–641. Cambridge: Cambridge University Press. ISBN 0-521-20160-8.
