= George of Pisidia =

7th-century Byzantine poet

George of Pisidia (Greek: Γεώργιος Πισίδης, Geōrgios Pisidēs; Latinized as Pisida; fl. 7th century AD) was a Byzantine poet, born in Pisidia. As an important early poet of Byzantine literature, he "contributed a great deal to the formation of many of the main features of Byzantine poetry".

== Life and career ==
His poems suggest that he was a Pisidian by birth, and a friend of Patriarch Sergius I of Constantinople and the Emperor Heraclius. He was a deacon, guardian of the sacred vessels, referendary, and chartophylax (keeper of the records) of the church of St. Sophia. His works have been published in the original Greek with a Latin version. About five thousand verses of his poetry, most in trimetric iambics, have survived.

His earliest work, in three cantos, is De expeditione Heraclii imperatoris contra Persas, libri tres on Heraclius' campaign against the Persians in 622 (a campaign in which a relic purporting to be the True Cross, which the Persians had captured some years before at Jerusalem, was recovered), seems to be the work of an eyewitness. This was followed by the Avarica (or Bellum Avaricum), an account of a futile attack on Constantinople by the Avars (626), during the absence of the emperor and his army, said to have been repulsed by the aid of the Virgin Mary; and by the Heraclias (or De extremo Chosroae Persarum regis excidio), a general survey of the exploits of Heraclius both at home and abroad down to the final overthrow of Chosroes in 627. In his paper The Official History of Heraclius' Persian Campaigns, James Howard-Johnston makes a strong case for George of Pisida also having composed a now lost account of Heraclius' Persian campaigns in a combination of prose and poetry. This account was apparently based on Heraclius' own dispatches from Persia to the citizens of Constantinople and was available for Theophanes the Confessor as a basis for his Chronographia.

Next he wrote In sanctam Jesu Christi, Dei nostri resurrectionem, in which the poet exhorts Flavius Constantinus to follow in the footsteps of his father, Heraclius. There was also a didactic poem, Hexameron or Cosmologia (also called Opus sex dierum seu Mundi opificium), upon the creation of the world, dedicated to Sergius; De vanitate vitae, a treatise on the vanity of life, after the manner of Ecclesiastes; Contra impium Severum Antiochiae, a controversial composition against Patriarch Severus of Antioch and his Monophysitism; two short poems, including In templum Deiparae Constantinopoli, in Blachernissitum upon the resurrection of Christ and on the recovery of the True Cross. He wrote one piece in prose, Encomium in S. Anastasium martyrem. References in Theophanes, Suidas, and Isaac Tzetzes, mention other lost works.

Michael Psellus later compared him with, and even prefers him to, Euripides. George of Pisidia has been suggested as a possible author of the Akathist Hymn to the Theotokos.
