= Battle of Erginay (605) =

Battle during the Byzantine–Sasanian War of 602–628

Battle of the Erginay (605)
- Part of Byzantine–Sasanian War of 602–628 & Sasanian invasion of Armenia (603)
Date	605
Location	Near Getik, modern day Armenia
Result	Sasanian victory

Belligerents
Byzantine Empire	Sasanian Empire

Commanders and leaders
Unknown	Datyean

Strength
Unknown but fewer	Unknown

Casualties and losses
Heavy	Unknown

The Battle of the Erginay was a confrontation between Byzantine and Sasanian Empires in Armenia in 604. The Sasanian army, led by Datyean, was victorious and dealt the Byzantines a heavy defeat, beginning the conquest of Armenia by Khosrow II.

== Background ==
Shahenshah Khosrow II had planned to launch an offensive into Armenia in 603, alongside his own campaign into Byzantine Syria towards Edessa. However, that offensive had been delayed due to the onset of severe winter weather. The following year, the Sasanian offensive began under the command of Dzuan Veh, but was met with a crushing defeat against the Byzantine Army in Armenia at the Battle of Elevard, with the loss of many Persian troops, including Dzuan Veh himself.

Following their initial triumph, the Byzantines likely dispatched troops from Armenia to reinforce Leontius, who was campaigning in Mesopotamia. Although initially successful, Leontius was decisively defeated by a Sasanian counteroffensive during the Battle of Arzamon, a victory which encouraged Khosrow to launch further offensives, both in Mesopotamia and in Armenia.

== Offensive into Armenia and Battle of Erginay ==
In 605, a new and larger Sasanian army was mustered to renew the invasion of Armenia, this time under Spahbod Datyean, who replaced the deceased Dzuan Veh. Due to the troop transfers of the previous year, the Sasanians enjoyed a numerical advantage against the Byzantines in Armenia, and thus sought battle.

In 605, Datoyean marched to the district of Shirak, meeting the opposing army at Sirakawan, where the Byzantines may have attempted to hold a line of defence along the Araxes river. However, when Datyean advanced rapidly against them, the Byzantines lost their nerve and withdraw. Near the fort of Erginay, the Byzantines were forced to engage in battle the pursuing Persians, who outmaneuvered them. Erginay itself had become crowded with refugees from the Armenian countryside, the able-bodied men among whom resolved to resist the invading Sasanians alongside the Byzantines. Thus, as the armies arrayed themselves, a contingent of pro-Byzantine Persarmenians sallied out of Erginay to raid the Sasanian camp, which dealt significant damage, yet failed to change the outcome of the battle. The Sasanians attacked and defeated the Byzantine line, killing many of their men in a vigorous pursuit, before looting their camp. After returning to their camp, the Persians were enraged upon measuring the damage inflicted by the Persarmenian raid, causing them to storm Erginay and massacre the refugees within.

== Aftermath ==
According to the contemporary historian Sebeos, after their victory, the Sasanians withdrew to Media. However, the success encouraged the Persians to conduct further invasions meant to degrade the shaken Byzantine presence in Armenia. Datoyean was succeeded in his position as commander of the northern armies by Senitam Khusro, who led another campaign towards Byzantine-held Theodosiopolis in late 605 or early 606. Erginay thus marked the first of a series of successful Sasanian offensives, which resulted in the Byzantines being driven out of most of the country by 608.

== Bibliography ==
- Greatrex, Geoffrey; Lieu, Samuel N. C. (2002), The Roman Eastern Frontier and the Persian Wars (Part II, 363–630 AD), Routledge, ISBN 978-0-415-00342-1
- Decker, Michael J. (2022). The Sasanian empire at War. Persia, Rome and the rise of Islam. Westholme Publishing, LLC. ISBN 978-1-59416-692-1.
- Syvänne, Ilkka (2022). The Military History of Late Rome AD 602–641. Pen and Sword. ISBN 978-1-39907-567-1.
- Howard-Johnston, James (2021), Heraclius: The Last Great War of Antiquity, Oxford University Press, ISBN 978-0-19-883019-1
