= Battle of Arzamon (605) =

Battle during the Byzantine–Sasanian War of 602–628

- Part of Byzantine–Sasanian War of 602–628
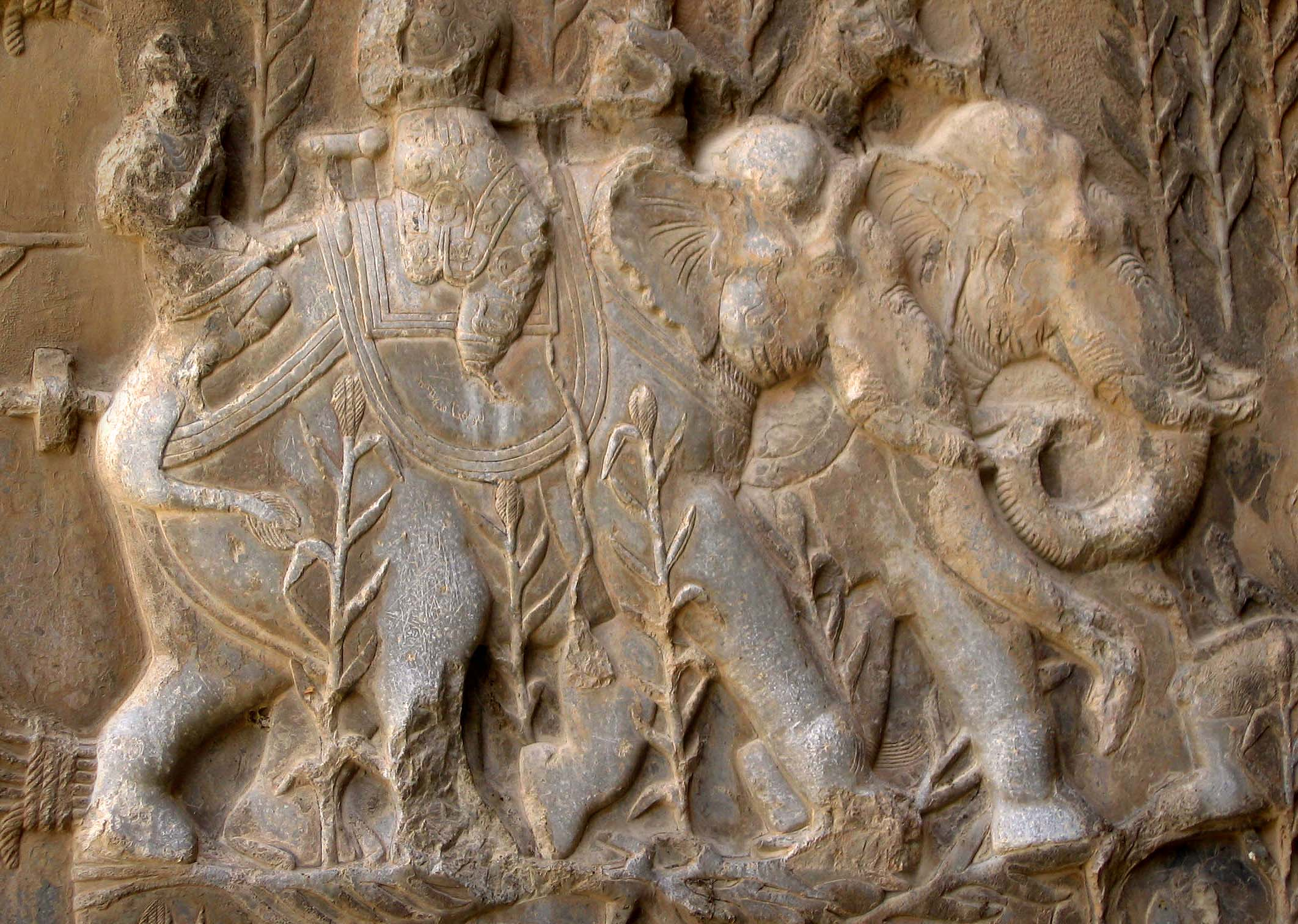
- Elephants from the royal Sasanian stable on a rock relief at Taq-e Bostan, carved during the reign of Khosrow II.
Date	Late 604 or early 605
Location	Arzamon (modern Zergan Su) river, near Dara, Upper Mesopotamia
Result	Decisive Sasanian victory

Belligerents
Byzantine Empire	Sasanian Empire

Commanders and leaders
Leontius	Khosrow II; Zongoes; Pseudo-Theodosius

Strength
50,000	45,000; Unknown number of war elephants

Casualties and losses
Very Heavy	Moderate (mostly suffered on the first day)

The Battle of Arzamon was fought between the armies of the Sasanian Shahenshah, Khosrow II Parviz, and a Byzantine army in Mesopotamia, led by Leontius, in late 604 or early 605. After two days of fighting, the Sasanians inflicted a decisive defeat upon the Byzantines, which exposed Dara to a renewed Sasanian offensive.

== Background ==
Following the deposition of Emperor Maurice in 602, a series of crises struck the Byzantine Empire. The Magister Militum of the East, Narses, who commanded a loyal corps of soldiers among the eastern field army, defied the usurper Phocas and rebelled from his strong base at Edessa. Phocas reacted quickly, dispatching loyalist troops under the new magister militum, Germanus, to crush Narses. However, Narses had sent a letter to Ctesiphon requesting aid from the Sasanian Emperor Khosrow II in the struggle against Phocas. With justification in supporting the rebel cause, and with the opportunity presented by the internal turmoil hindering Byzantine defence, Khosrow resolved to support Narses in the coming year.

After detaining Phocas' envoy, Lilius, the Shahenshah mustered a large army and advanced into Upper Mesopotamia in 603. The Sasanians relieved Narses and defeated the loyalist Byzantines, with Germanus mortally wounded in the engagement. (Note: Decker (pp.201 & 202) combines the descriptions of the battle of Arzamon with the defeat of Germanus, combining the two into one engagement and dating it to 603) After this victory, Khosrow entered Edessa, where he performed a coronation ceremony for Pseudo-Theodosius, a man in his retinue alleged to be the son of Maurice and a pretender to the Byzantine throne. Khosrow then detached part of his army under Pseudo-Theodosius, to besiege the forward operating base of Dara, and returned with the rest to Veh Ardashir before the onset of winter.

== Leontius' offensive in 604 ==
When these developments in the east became known to Phocas in spring 604, the Emperor signed a peace treaty with the Avar Khaganate, in order to dispatch reinforcements eastwards, where the Sasanians began incursions against Byzantine-held Armenia. The result of the ensuing invasion was the Battle of Elevard, which was a defeat for the Persians.

At the same time, another Byzantine army was mustered in preparation for an offensive further south, with the aim of relieving Dara and crushing Narses. Researcher Ilkka Syvänne proposes that Leontius' forces may have been reinforced by troops dispatched from Armenia, following the Byzantine victory at Elevard. Leontius was successful in relieving the city, forcing Pseudo-Theodosius' Sasanian forces to retreat. Additionally, a separate Byzantine column, under an unknown general, had marched against Narses in Edessa, and forced him to flee from the city of Hierapolis. Following the relief of Dara, Leontius pursued Pseudo-Theodosius and his Persian allies. According to the Khuzestan Chronicle, Leontius forced Pseudo-Theodosius' outnumbered army to battle near Bezabde and defeated it, which forced him to dispatch a plea for aid to Khosrow II.

== Khosrow's counteroffensive and the Battle ==
The setbacks suffered by the Sasanians in 604 prompted an immediate response from Khosrow II to regain the initiative. Khosrow collected the forces available to him, which included the standing units of bodyguard cavalry in the vicinity of Ctesiphon, and also war elephants from the royal stable, but he was forced to march into Upper Mesopotamia before forces from further east could be assembled. However, as Khosrow was reinforced en route by Sasanian troops from Nisibis, and the remnants of Pseudo-Theodosius' army, his forces likely approached 45,000 men. Nevertheless, as Leontius' army was probably bolstered by troops from Armenia, he likely had a slightly larger army than the Sasanians, roughly 50,000 men.

According to Theophanes the Confessor, the two armies met each other at the Arzamon river, located slightly west of Dara. When the armies clashed on the first day, the Byzantine gained the upper hand against their counterparts, pushing back their lines. One of the Byzantine horsemen came close to capturing Khosrow by throwing lasso around him, but a bodyguard of Khosrow's, a certain Mushkan, saved the Shahenshah by cutting the rope. (Note: Use of the lasso might imply the man was an ethnic Avar or Bulgar in Roman service) Despite being worsted, the Sasanian army was able to maintain its cohesion and hold until nightfall, due to the presence of the Shahenshah and elite forces, after which both sides returned to their camps.

On the second day of the battle, the Sasanians employed new tactics involving their war elephants. Theophanes narrates that Khosrow arrayed these into a "moving fortress" formation ahead of his cavalry, with infantry positioned in the intervals between the elephants. The sight of these beasts inspired dread in the Byzantine soldiers, and this time Leontius' army was soundly defeated by the Sasanian assault. The Sasanians inflicted severe losses in the pursuit of their enemy, and following this victory Khosrow ordered behading of the captured soldiers.

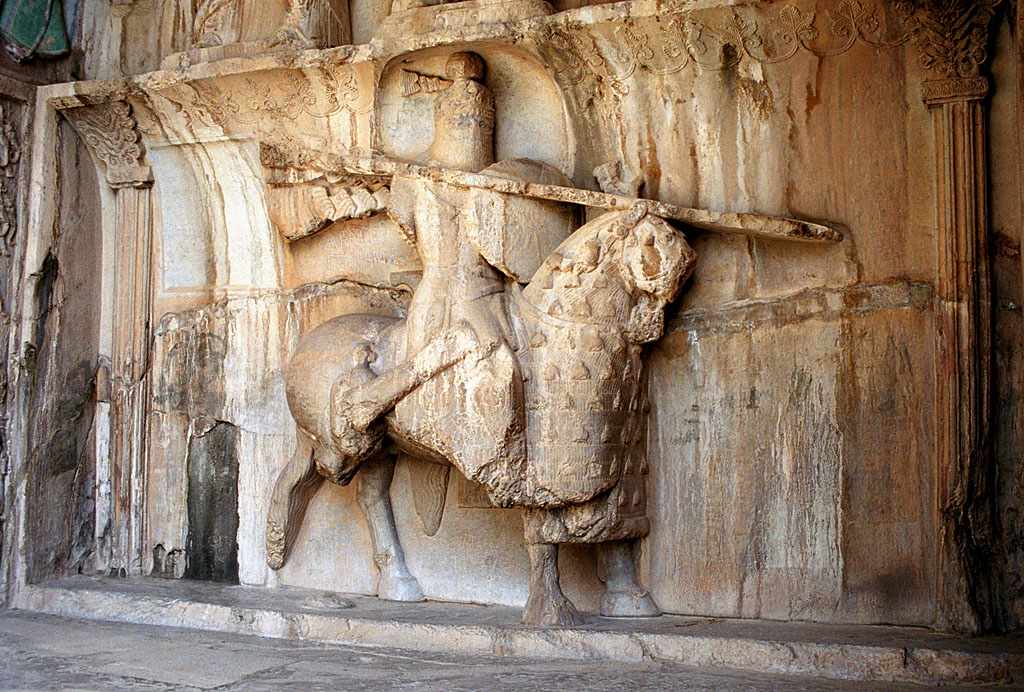
Equestrian statue of Khosrow II from Taq-e Bostan

== Aftermath ==
With the major success at Arzamon, the course of the war swung decisively back in favour of the Sasanian Empire. Khosrow returned in triumph to Ctesiphon, while his army in Upper Mesopotamia was placed under his subcommander, Zongoes, to resume the siege of Dara and capture other Byzantine cities and forts in the strategic Tur Abdin region. From Ctesiphon, Khorsow dispatched Shahrbaraz and Kardarigan to take command of operations in Mesopotamia, while organizing a second invasion of Armenia to exploit the prior transfer of Byzantine forces from there, this time placing Datyean in command of the campaign. The Sasanians proved highly successful in this theatre too, defeating the Byzantines at the Battle of Erginay.

On the Byzantine side, Leontius had managed to escape the debacle, but as punishment for his disastrous defeat, Phocas ordered Leontius be imprisoned and bound in chains. Attempting to regain the initiative after the disaster at Arzamon, Phocas then organized a further expedition to Mesopotamia later in that year, under his nephew Domentziolus. Though initially successful in forcing the surrender of the rebel Narses, Domentziolus army was subsequently ambushed by the Persians near the Tigris and annihilated. This second disaster sealed the fate of Dara, which fell to the Sasanians in late 605.

== Bibliography ==
- Greatrex, Geoffrey; Lieu, Samuel N. C. (2002), The Roman Eastern Frontier and the Persian Wars (Part II, 363–630 AD), Routledge, ISBN 978-0-415-00342-1
- Decker, Michael J. (2022). The Sasanian empire at War. Persia, Rome and the rise of Islam. Westholme Publishing, LLC. ISBN 978-1-59416-692-1.
- Syvänne, Ilkka (2022). The Military History of Late Rome AD 602–641. Pen and Sword. ISBN 978-1-39907-567-1.
- Howard-Johnston, James (2021), Heraclius: The Last Great War of Antiquity, Oxford University Press, ISBN 978-0-19-883019-1
