= Getik =

Getik may refer to:

- Getik, Gegharkunik, Armenia
- Getik, Shirak, Armenia
- Getikvank, Armenia
- Getik River, Armenia
