= Sasanian invasion of Armenia (603) =

Sasanian campaign against Byzantine empire

- Part of the Byzantine–Sasanian War of 602–628
| Date | 603–610 |
| Location | Byzantine Armenia, Byzantine Empire |
| Result | Sasanian victory |
| Territorial changes | Most of Byzantine Armenia occupied by the Sasanian Empire |

Belligerents
| Sassanian Empire | Byzantine Empire |

Commanders and leaders
| Shahin Vahmanzadegan; Datyean; Ashtat Yestayar | Germanus † |

Casualties and losses
| Unknown | Heavy |

The Sasanian invasion of Armenia was a military campaign that took place in 603 to 610 as part of the Last Great War of Antiquity. As a result of a long struggle, the Persians finally defeated the Romans and captured Armenia.

== Background ==
As a result of the previous war (572–591), the Sassanids lost most of the lands in the Caucasus and were rolled back to the east. That war, however, had emptied the Byzantine treasury, and the empire was in the midst of a crisis after the murder of the emperor Maurice by the usurper Phocas. Armenia was supposed to become the main theater of military operations at the beginning of the war, since it had a complex geography and a strong system of forts, besides, the Persians needed to regain the territory that had previously been taken away by Byzantium.

== Invasion ==
In 603, the Sassanids invaded with large forces on the territory of Byzantium and took the city of Dara in 605. The Iranian commander Dzuan Veh wanted to continue his success, but was defeated in a battle with the Romans near Yerevan. At the same time, the Roman commander Germanus also died as a result of an unfortunate skirmish near Constantinople. Already in 605, the Persians were able to inflict another decisive defeat on the Romans by massacring the captured camp. Over the next few years, neither side could gain a foothold in the territory, until finally, the Persians inflicted two defeats on the Romans at Theodopolis, and after a while they forced the city to surrender. By 610, all of Armenia had been conquered by the Sassanids. Their success was accompanied by the fact that the best Roman commander Narses rebelled against Phocas and supported the Iranians.

== Aftermath ==
All attempts to stop the Persians were in vain, and they took a break only when they had conquered as far as Chalcedon, which was located a few miles from Constantinople. Later, the Byzantines would try to go on the offensive, but suffered a serious defeat in Battle of Antioch (613) and begin to lose more territory. (Note: See Sasanian conquest of Jerusalem and Sasanian conquest of Egypt) The Byzantine Empire would not recover until the 620s, when they were able to inflict a number of severe defeats on the Persians. (Note: See Heraclius' campaign of 622, Heraclius Caucasus campaign and Battle of Nineveh (627))
