= Maruzas =

6th-century Iranian commander

Maruzas was a 6th-century Iranian commander active during the reign of the Sasanian king (shah) Hormizd IV (r. 579–590). He was defeated and killed by a Byzantine army led by Germanus at the battle of Martyropolis.

== Sources ==
- Martindale, John R., ed. (1992). The Prosopography of the Later Roman Empire: Volume III, AD 527–641. Cambridge: Cambridge University Press. ISBN 0-521-20160-8.
