= Leontius (general under Phocas) =

7th century Byzantine general who served under Emperor Phocas

Leontius was a 7th century Byzantine general who served under Emperor Phocas in the context of the Byzantine-Sassanian War (602–628). He was originally from Syria and previously served the Byzantine court as a senior ranking eunuch and sakellarios.

In 604, magister militum Germanus was ordered to quell the revolt of a rebel commander named Narses in the city of Edessa. Narses, a loyalist of Emperor Maurice, revolted against Phocas, after Phocas usurped and killed Maurice in November 602. Khosrow II of Persia, because he was previously on good terms with Emperor Maurice, grew sympathetic to Narses' cause, and eventually sent an army to his aid. Germanus was defeated and killed by the rebel-supporting Persian forces.

Leontius arrived in the region to replace Germanus. He managed to successfully recapture Edessa, while Narses was brought to Constantinople and burned alive. Shortly after, the Sassanians attacked the Roman army once again, defeating Leontius at the battle of Arzamon. Phocas had the general recalled and subsequently imprisoned.

Leontius was replaced in Mesopotamia by Phocas' nephew, Domentziolus, who took the title of magister militum per Orientem.
