= Battle of Martyropolis (588) =

Battle in the Byzantine–Sasanian War of 572–591

- Part of the Byzantine–Sassanid War of 572–591
- Map of the Byzantine-Persian frontier
Date	Summer 588
Location	Martyropolis (modern Silvan, Turkey) 38.1422°N 41.0014°E
Result	Byzantine victory

Belligerents
Sassanid Empire	Byzantine Empire

Commanders and leaders
Maruzas †	Germanus

Casualties and losses
Heavy casualties 3,000 taken captive	Unknown

The Battle of Martyropolis was fought in summer 588 near Martyropolis between an East Roman (Byzantine) and a Sassanid Persian army, and resulted in a Byzantine victory.

== Background ==
The Byzantine army of the East had been weakened by a mutiny in April 588, caused by unpopular cost-cutting measures and directed against the new commander, Priscus. Priscus was attacked and fled the army camp, and the mutineers chose the dux of Phoenice Libanensis, Germanus, as their temporary leader.

Byzantine Emperor Maurice then restored the former commander, Philippicus, to the post, but before he could arrive and take control, the Persians, taking advantage of the disorder, invaded Byzantine territory and attacked Constantina. Germanus organized a force of a thousand men which relieved the siege. As the historian Theophylact Simocatta records, "with difficulty [Germanus] spurred on and incited the Roman contingents with speeches" and managed to assemble 4,000 men and launch a raid into Persian territory. The arrival of Maurice's envoy Aristobulus eased the tension in the Byzantine camp, and the soldiers were restored to discipline.

== Battle ==
Germanus then led his army north to Martyropolis, from where he launched another raid across the border into Arzanene. The attack was blocked by the Persian general Maruzas (and possibly corresponds also with the raid defeated in battle at Tsalkajur near Lake Van by the Persian marzban of Armenia, Aphrahat), and turned back.

The Persians under Maruzas followed close behind, and a battle was fought near Martyropolis which resulted in a major Byzantine victory. According to Simocatta's account, Maruzas was killed, several of the Persian leaders were captured along with 3,000 other prisoners, and only a thousand men survived to reach refuge at Nisibis. The Byzantines secured much booty, including the Persian battle standards, and sent them along with Maruzas' head to Maurice in Constantinople.
