= Sack of Dvin (624) =

Siege during the Byzantine–Sasanian War of 602–628

- Part of the Caucasian campaigns of Heraclius and Byzantine–Sasanian War of 602–628
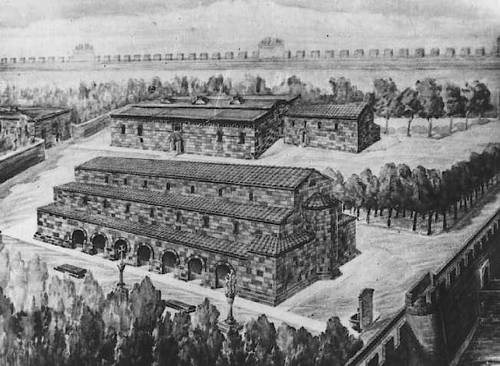
- Drawing of the central square of Dvin, with defences in the background
Date	May or Early June 624
Location	Dvin (Armenia)
Result	Byzantine victory

Belligerents
Byzantine Empire	Sasanian Armenia; Sasanian Empire

Commanders and leaders
Heraclius	Unknown

Strength
120,000 (Sebeos); 15,000–20,000 (modern estimates)	Unknown, but outnumbered

Casualties and losses
Unknown	Unknown

The Sack of Dvin was an investment of the Armenian city of Dvin by the army of the Byzantine Empire under Emperor Heraclius. The Byzantines captured the city and sacked it.

== Background ==
The successful campaign against the forces of Shahrvaraz in the Anatolian campaign had restored some confidence in Byzantine arms after more than a decade of defeats against the Sasanians, yet this had still been a defensive victory attained in Roman territory. In order to apply strategic pressure against the enemy, Heraclius planned a more ambitious campaign to carry the war into the holdings of the Sasanian Empire itself for the year 624. On 25 March 624 the emperor left Constantinople and set off towards the Caucasus. After a brief stay at Nicomedia on 15 April to celebrate Easter he continued on to the forward operating base of Caesarea in Cappadocia. Having prepared his army, Heraclius then marched into Armenia.

== Fall of Dvin ==
From Caesarea Heraclius proceeded north to Theodosiopolis and eastwards from there, marking the beginning of the Caucasian campaigns of Heraclius. Heraclius' first target was the commercial and administrative centre of Sasanian Armenia, the city of Dvin. The city of Theodosiopolis would have presented an obstacle to his advance, but no action there is recorded and contemporary sources do not specify whether it submitted to Heraclius or if the Emperor bypassed it on his march to Dvin.

When Heraclius reached Dvin, his army invested it in a siege of unspecified length. Details of the operation have not survived, but in the context of the siege of Ganzak later in the same campaign, George of Pisidia recorded the use of siege engines such as battering rams and stone-throwing artillery, demonstrating that Heraclius had mustered a sizeable siege train to accompany his army in the campaign. The sudden Byzantine invasion had also come as a surprise to the cities of the Sasanian Caucasus, with the garrisons in Dvin and the cities attacked afterward likely not having made adequate preparations to withstand a siege by the skilled Byzantine engineers. Ultimately, Dvin fell to the Byzantines, who ruthlessly plundered and sacked it. As the city had largely been populated by Armenian Christians, George of Pisidia wrote a poem lamenting its destruction by the Emperor Heraclius. Dvin was thus the first city of the Sasanian Caucasus to fall to the Byzantines during the 620s.

== Aftermath ==
Following the sack of Dvin, Heraclius' spies reported to him that the Sasanian Shahanshah Khosrow II had mustered his army near Ganzak, prompting the Emperor to direct his offensive towards Media. On the way, Heraclius' army put the city of Nachkawan under siege, with that city being taken and pillaged around the time of the summer solstice (Late June) according to Theophanes. Soon after this, the fortress of Ormi was sacked too according to the Armenian historian Thomas Artsruni. Heraclius then proceeded Southwards into Iran itself, leading to a clash with the Sasanian army at the Battle of Ganzak.

== Bibliography ==
- Syvänne, Ilkka (2022). The Military History of Late Rome AD 602–641. Pen and Sword. ISBN 978-1-39907-567-1.
- Howard-Johnston, James (2021), Heraclius: The Last Great War of Antiquity, Oxford University Press, ISBN 978-0-19-883019-1
- Kaegi, Walter Emil (2003), Heraclius: Emperor of Byzantium, Cambridge University Press, ISBN 978-0-521-81459-1
- Greatrex, Geoffrey (1991). The Roman Eastern Frontier and the Persian wars.Part II.363-630AD. Routledge. ISBN 0-415-14687-9.
