= Ashtat Yeztayar =

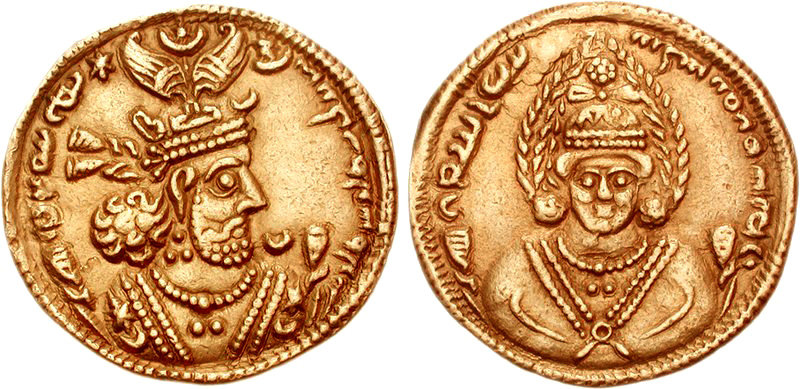
Rare golden coin of Khosrau II

Ashtat Yeztayar was an Iranian military officer under the Sasanian king Khosrow II (r. 590–628).

Ashtat is first mentioned 606/7 as being appointed as the leader of the Sasanian invasion of Armenia, thus succeeding the previous Sasanian commander of Armenia, Senitam Khusro. During his invasion of Armenia, he is said to have had the son of the former Byzantine emperor Maurice, Theodosius, as his companion (or one pretending to be him). Ashtat soon managed to rout a Byzantine army at Phasiane and then harassed them as far as Satala.

He then marched towards Theodosiopolis, and managed to make the city surrender by showing them Theodosius. He then seized several Armenian cities such as Citharizum, Satala, Nicopolis and Apastiay. After that, Ashtat Yeztayar disappears from mention in sources. He was shortly succeeded by Shahin Vahmanzadegan in 607/8.

== Notes ==
a: From Middle Persian *Ashtâd-yazd-yâr, literally "one who Arshtat is his friend"

== Sources ==
- Martindale, John Robert; Jones, Arnold Hugh Martin; Morris, J., eds. (1992). The Prosopography of the Later Roman Empire, Volume III: A.D. 527–641. Cambridge, United Kingdom: Cambridge University Press. ISBN 978-0-521-20160-5.
- Greatrex, Geoffrey; Lieu, Samuel N. C. (2002). The Roman Eastern Frontier and the Persian Wars (Part II, 363–630 AD). New York, New York and London, United Kingdom: Routledge (Taylor & Francis). ISBN 0-415-14687-9.

| Preceded by Senitam Khusro | Sasanian commander of Armenia; 606/7 - 607/8 | Succeeded by Shahin Vahmanzadegan |
