= Senitam Khusro =

Sasanian military commander

Senitam Khusro, was an Iranian military officer, who served as the commander of Armenia from 605/6 to 606/7 under the Sasanian king Khosrow II (r. 590–628).

Senitam is first mentioned 605/6 as being appointed as the leader of the Sasanian invasion of Armenia, thus succeeding the previous Sasanian commander of Armenia, Datoyean. Senitam shortly outflanked the troops of the Byzantine commander at Anglon, Theodosius Khorkhoruni. The Byzantines then asked for an allowance to withdraw from the city, but were defeated and routed during a surprise attack by Senitam, who captured Theodosius. Senitam then defeated another army in Phasiane, while various fortresses fell under Sasanian control. Later in 606/7, Senitam was succeeded by Ashtat Yeztayar.

== Sources ==
- Martindale, John Robert; Jones, Arnold Hugh Martin; Morris, J., eds. (1992). The Prosopography of the Later Roman Empire, Volume III: A.D. 527–641. Cambridge, United Kingdom: Cambridge University Press. ISBN 978-0-521-20160-5.
- Greatrex, Geoffrey; Lieu, Samuel N. C. (2002). The Roman Eastern Frontier and the Persian Wars (Part II, 363–630 AD). New York, New York and London, United Kingdom: Routledge (Taylor & Francis). ISBN 0-415-14687-9.

Preceded by Datoyean	Sasanian commander of Armenia; 606/7 - 607/8	Succeeded by Ashtat Yeztayar
