= Battle of Elevard =

Battle between Sasanian and Byzantine armies

- Part of the Byzantine–Sasanian War of 602–628 and the Persian invasion of Byzantium (603)
Date	Spring 604 CE
Location	Near Yerevan, Byzantine Empire (now Armenia)
Result	Byzantine victory

Belligerents
Byzantine Empire	Sasanian Empire

Commanders and leaders
Germanus	Dzuan Veh †

Strength
Unknown	Unknown

Casualties and losses
Unknown, possibly light	Heavy

The Battle of Elevard was a battle between the Byzantine army under the command of Germanus and the Sasanian army under the command of Dzuan Veh. The Byzantine army decisively defeated the Sasanian army and killed their commander.

During the first invasion of Byzantium, after the capture of Dara, the army of the Persian commander Dzuan Veh moved into Byzantine Armenia. The Byzantine commander Germanus advanced to his location and the two armies met at Elevard (near Yerevan). There was a fierce battle, during which the Persian army was defeated and their commander died. Due to the battle, the Persian offensive was halted, and only one year later would the Sassanians be able to continue their invasion.
