= Getik, Shirak =

Getik
- Location within Armenia Location within Shirak
- Coordinates: 40°55′N 44°03′E
- Country: Armenia
- Marz (Province): Shirak
- Time zone: UTC+4 ( )
  - Summer (DST): UTC+5 ( )

Getik (Armenian: Գետիկ; also, Alikhan) is a town in the Shirak Province of Armenia.
