= Germanus (magister militum under Phocas) =

Byzantine army officer

Germanus (Greek: Γερμανός; died 604) was a Byzantine general who served under Emperor Phocas (r. 602–610) in the early stages of the Byzantine-Sassanid War of 602–628.

== Biography ==
Germanus is possibly the same as the dux of Phoenice, who was chosen by the army as its leader during the mutiny at Monocarton in Easter 588, in place of Priscus. Although Germanus restored discipline and led the army to a victory against the Persians, he was tried and found guilty by a subsequent tribunal. Sentenced to death, he was quickly pardoned and received rewards from Emperor Maurice (r. 582–602).

In 602, shortly before the outbreak of the revolt against Emperor Maurice that brought Phocas to power, Germanus was placed in command of the strategically important fortress of Dara in Mesopotamia. In early 603, he received Lilius, the envoy Phocas had sent to announce his accession to the Persian shah Khosrau II (r. 590–628). At this time, Germanus was reportedly attacked and wounded by one of his soldiers, but soon recovered.

In late 603, Narses, the Byzantine commander-in-chief of the eastern armies, rebelled against Phocas. He failed to secure the support of most of the army, and Germanus was ordered to besiege him at his base at Edessa. Narses, however, had sought and obtained the support of Khosrau II, who was eager to regain lost territory and avenge the murder of Emperor Maurice, who had helped him regain his throne in 591. Khosrau therefore sent a Persian army into Mesopotamia. Germanus met the Persians in battle near the city of Constantina, but was defeated and heavily wounded, dying a few days after in Constantina.

== Sources ==
- Martindale, John R., ed. (1992). The Prosopography of the Later Roman Empire: Volume III, AD 527–641. Cambridge: Cambridge University Press. ISBN 0-521-20160-8.
- Treadgold, Warren (1997). A History of the Byzantine State and Society. Stanford, California: Stanford University Press. ISBN 0-8047-2630-2.
