= Narses (magister militum per Orientem) =

Byzantine army officer

Narses (Greek: Ναρσής) was a Byzantine general of Armenian ancestry active during the reigns of the emperors Maurice and Phocas in the late sixth and early seventh centuries CE. He commanded the army in Mesopotamia as the magister militum per Orientem under Maurice. Together with Khosrow II, he fought against the Sasanian usurper Bahram Chobin.

When Phocas overthrew Maurice and seized the throne, Narses refused to recognize the usurper. Besieged by Phocas' troops in the city of Edessa, Narses called for Khosrow to aid him and was rescued by the Persian forces. He attempted to salvage the situation with a diplomatic mission but was burned alive in Constantinople by Phocas' government after having been promised safety.
