= Ashot II Bagratuni =

Armenian prince of the VII century

Ashot II Bagratuni Աշոտ Բ Բագրատունի

Sper and Tayk prince (670-689) armenian prince
- Reign: c. 684-689
- Predecessor: Grigor I Mamikonian
- Successor: Nerseh Kamsarakan
- Born: c. unknown
- Died: c. 689; Dariunq
- Issue: Smbat Bagratuni
- Dynasty: Bagratuni
- Father: Smbat V Bagratuni
- Mother: Unknown Arshakuni

Ashot Bagratuni (Armenian: Աշոտ Բ Բագրատունի, date of birth unknown – c. 689) was an Armenian ishkhan (prince) and the ruler of Armenia from 685 to 689. He succeeded Grigor Mamikonian. Ashot appointed his nephew Smbat as sparapet (commander-in-chief) of the Armenian forces, made peace with the Arabs, and undertook extensive construction activities. During his reign, the country’s socio-economic and cultural life flourished. Beginning in 685/686, as Armenia came under Byzantine attacks, he was compelled to devote attention to the defense of the country.

Having been severely wounded in battle, Ashot Bagratuni was taken to his native fortress-city of Dariunq, where he died and was buried in the ancestral burial place. Ashot Bagratuni built the Holy Savior (Amenaprkich) Church in Dariunq and composed the sharakan beginning with the words “Zors əst patkeri” (“Whom according to the image”). He was one of the first laymen whose hymn was accepted by the Church. In a number of old and new collections of sharakans, this hymn is mistakenly attributed to Grigor Magistros. He inherited the title of Prince of Sper and Tayk from his brother, Varaz-Tirots III Bagratuni. Ashot was succeeded by his nephew Smbat. He had one son, also named Smbat, who was killed by the Arabs in 705 during the massacre of Nakhchavan.

== History ==
The Bagratunis were an Armenian nakharar (noble) dynasty. According to Movses Khorenatsi, the Bagratunis descended from a Jew named Shambat. One of his descendants, Shambat Bagrat, was appointed by Valarshak, the traditional king of Armenia, as the royal crown-bearer and aspet. He was also appointed governor of the western part of Armenia, and the dynasty was named after him as Bagratuni. Following the abolition of the Arsacid monarchy, the Bagratunis acquired the district of Kogovit in the province of Ayrarat. At the end of the 5th century, Sahak Bagratuni became the marzpan of Armenia. During the 7th–8th centuries, the Bagratunis competed with the Mamikonians for political supremacy. In the 7th century, Ashot Bagratuni (685–689), the ishkhan (prince) of Armenia, was a prominent member of the dynasty. During this period, the Bagratunis exercised considerable influence in the Vostan Hayots district of the Ayrarat province, which they controlled by the middle of the 9th century. In the 8th century, the office of ishkhan of Armenia was held predominantly by members of the Bagratuni dynasty. They gradually displaced the Mamikonians from the political arena. At the end of the 8th century, the Bagratunis also established themselves in the province of Tayk and the district of Kgharjk, while at the end of the 9th century they established the royal house of the Georgian Bagratids in Georgia. Among its prominent representatives were David the Builder (1089–1125), George III (1156–1184), and Queen Tamar (1184–1213). At the end of the 9th century, they established a royal dynasty in Georgia. The territories of the Bagratunis expanded considerably at the beginning of the 9th century, when Ashot Msaker (the Carnivore) Bagratuni acquired Taron, Shirak, Arsharunik, Ashotsk, Tashir, Mokk, Sasun, and Shamshat. During this period, Bagaran was the dynastic center of the Bagratunis. From the 9th century onward, the Bagratunis became the most influential dynasty and ruled the country hereditarily, first as ishkhans of Armenia, then as ishkhanats ishkhan (Prince of Princes), and finally, from 885 onward, as kings of Armenia. The Bagratunis held the court office of royal crown-bearer and aspet, and they were therefore often referred to, according to their official position, as Aspetuni. The hereditary domain of the Bagratunis was the district of Sper in the province of Upper Armenia. Following the abolition of the Arsacid monarchy in 428, their hereditary possessions also included the district of Kogovit in the province of Ayrarat, with the fortress of Dariunq. At the end of the 5th century, Sahak Bagratuni became the marzpan of Armenia.

== Period of rule ==
The struggle between Caliph Ali (656–661) and Muawiya, the governor of Syria, slowed the pace of the Arab conquests; however, after Muawiya became caliph, the Arabs entered into serious conflicts with Byzantium. By 670, they had already reached the vicinity of Constantinople. After Muawiya’s death, although internal divisions began within the Umayyad state, Abd al-Malik ultimately consolidated the caliphate. Around 670, Ashot II was already known as the prince of Sper and Tayk. At that time, the position of the Bagratunis was gradually strengthening, while the influence of the Mamikonians was weakening. In 685, an important change took place: Grigor Mamikonian, the ishkhan of Armenia, was killed while fighting against the Khazars, and the rule of Armenia passed to Ashot II Bagratuni. Thus, he became one of the country’s leading nakharars, bearing the title “Ishkhan of Armenia.” During the years of Ashot II’s rule, Armenia once again found itself at the center of the Byzantine-Arab conflict. In 685, Emperor Justinian II launched a campaign into Armenia, while at the same time Arab forces were attempting to restore their influence. Ashot II was forced to operate between the two great powers while preserving the position of the Armenian nobility. In 689, a new Byzantine-Arab confrontation took place in Armenia. Ashot II took part in this struggle and, according to Byzantine sources, died from wounds he had received. After his death, the office of Ishkhan of Armenia passed to other nakharars. The historical significance of Ashot II Bagratuni lies in the fact that he became one of the Bagratuni representatives who, already in the 7th century, elevated the political position of their dynasty. The political stability of Armenia was also facilitated by the fact that, during the period in question, the Arab-Byzantine wars took place mostly outside Armenia, and the country was not subjected to devastation. For several years, Muawiya’s direct attacks on Constantinople by land and sea brought no results to the caliphate, while in 677 a large part of the Arab fleet was destroyed by a storm, and the caliph was even forced to pay the Byzantines a large annual sum as war indemnity. The treaty concluded on this matter was to remain in force for thirty years.

In 680, Muawiya died. His death and the defeat of the Umayyads by Byzantium brought anti-Umayyad forces into action, and they fought bloody battles for the throne for several years. Taking advantage of the complicated situation that had arisen within the caliphate, the Armenians rebelled in 683, threw off the Arab yoke, and refused to fulfill their tax and other obligations toward the caliphate. As a result of this rebellion, Armenia achieved complete independence by 689.

The Armenian rebellions also had a major impact on the other peoples of Transcaucasia. Following the example of the Armenians, the Georgians and the peoples of Caucasian Albania rose against the Arabs in the 680s. During this period, peace in Armenia and Transcaucasia was occasionally disrupted by the Khazars of the North Caucasus, who frequently invaded Transcaucasia with large armies, plundering and devastating extensive territories. During one such campaign in the mid-680s, the Armenians and Georgians, after a difficult and heroic struggle, succeeded in driving the Khazars out of the country. Grigor Mamikonian also died bravely in these battles, along with many others. From the mid-680s onward, Arab-Byzantine relations once again became tense. Immediately after ascending the throne, Justinian II resumed the war against the Arabs in an attempt to recover the territories that had previously belonged to Byzantium. The first military operations undertaken by Byzantium for this purpose were directed against Armenia. In 689, a huge Byzantine army under the command of the general Leontius marched toward Armenia. The Byzantine troops were ordered to treat the Armenians as a people that had accepted subjugation to the enemy and opposed the principles of the Chalcedonian Church. This meant that Justinian was prepared to employ every means of violence and terror in Armenia. The historian Ghevond testifies that, upon entering Armenia, Byzantine soldiers ruthlessly massacred the population, plundered its property, and devastated settlements. They did not even spare valuable architectural monuments and buildings. According to the testimony of Asoghik, during this war the Byzantines devastated 25 gavars and took 8,000 people captive. During these events, the Arabs not only lacked the opportunity to resist the Byzantines, but also increased the tribute they were required to pay to Byzantium and, by a special treaty concluded in 689, ceded Armenia to Byzantium. In the same year, 689, despite the persistent resistance shown by the peoples of Armenia and Transcaucasia, Byzantium conquered both Armenia and Transcaucasia.

Armenia under imperial control meant that, in place of the former Iranian viceroy, one of the local princes was appointed to occupy a position of supremacy over the others and to govern the country on behalf of the emperor. Thus, the office of the presiding prince came into existence. However, about a quarter of a century later, the rising Caliphate destroyed the weakened Sasanian monarchy and, largely becoming its successor, began to replace the empire in exercising suzerainty over this country, which had long been the object of rivalry. This was the first example of a Christian vassal state within an Islamic empire. The office of presiding prince of Armenia (or its equivalent, the Prince of Princes / the high office of the chief sparapet) was preserved and was conferred by the caliph. The empire, however, did not abandon its claims over Armenia, and the country continued, as before, to remain a battleground between rival empires. Thus, the presiding princes of Armenia sometimes became vassals of the caliph and sometimes of the emperor. Those who submitted to the Byzantine emperor received the Byzantine title of patrikios, and sometimes the even higher title of kouropalates (which at that time was usually granted to the brothers and cousins of emperors). Princes recognized by the caliph were called baṭrīq, the Arabic form of the word “patrikios”. During this period of Armenian history, as the rival Mamikonian dynasty began to decline, the power and importance of the Bagratunis increased. Although they generally tended to cooperate with the Arabs, they sometimes returned to their traditional policy, changing their allies and political orientations.

In the 7th century, Armenia was a principality whose ruler, the Prince of Armenia, was elected by an assembly of the nakharars and then confirmed and granted titles by the emperor or the caliph. The prince had no permanent residence, since each ruler resided in his own domains. Theodoros Rshtuni was based at Aghtamar, Hamazasp and Grigor Mamikonian at Bitlis (Western Armenia, the village of Arunk in the Mush Plain), Ashot Bagratuni at Dariunq, and Nerseh Kamsarakan at Yervandashat. The Armenian principality was semi-independent; during the final years of Grigor Mamikonian’s rule and under the rule of his successor, Ashot II Bagratuni, Armenia enjoyed complete independence. From the second half of the 7th century onward, peace greatly contributed to the development of economic life. Transit trade between Iran and Asia Minor passed through the Araks Valley, creating favorable conditions for the development of existing cities and the establishment of new ones, including Dvin, Vagharshapat, Yervandashat, and Karin. Classical monuments of Armenian architecture were created, while Armenian literary culture flourished, producing such prominent figures as Anania Shirakatsi and Sebeos.

== Family ==
Name	Years	Notes
Smbat V	646
Varaz-Tirots III	670	son of Smbat V
Ashot II, Prince of Armenia	684-689	son of Smbat V
Smbat VI, Prince of Armenia	693-726	son of Varaz-Tirots III
Ashot		son of Varaz-Tirots III
Vasak Bagratuni		son of Varaz-Tirots III
Bagrat		son of Varaz-Tirots III
Smbat, Prince	705	son of Ashot II
Ashot III, Prince of Armenia	732-748	son of Vasak
Sahak III,Prince of Armenia	753-770	son of Bagrat

== See also ==
- Ashot Bagratuni (other meanings)

== Sources ==
- Grousset, René (1973). Histoire de l'Arménie, des origines à 1071 (in French). Paris: Payot.
- Laurent, Joseph L. (1919). L'Arménie entre Byzance et l'Islam: depuis la conquête arabe jusqu'en 886 (in French). Paris: De Boccard.
- Տեր-Ղևոնդյան Ա․, Հայոց իշխանությունը արաբական տիրապետության ժամանակաշրջանում, «ՍՊԲ», 1964, № 2։
- Cyrille Toumanoff, Les dynasties de la Caucasie chrétienne de l'Antiquité jusqu'au xixe siècle։ Tables généalogiques et chronologiques, Rome, 1990, p. 122.
- Վարդան վարդապետ, Հաւաքումն պատմութեան Վենետիկ, 1862, 178։
- Ղևոնդ, պատմություն, Երևան, 1982։

Preceded by Grigor I Mamikonian 685	Presiding prince of Armenia in rivalry with Nerses Kamsarakan; 685–690	Succeeded by Nerses Kamsarakan 689-691

Ashot II Bagratuni Sper and Tayk prince Born: unknown Died: 689
Preceded by Varaz Tirots III Bagratuni	Ashot II Bagratuni; 670-689	Succeeded by Smbat VI Bagratuni 689-691
