= Bagratuni family tree =

Heritage of the Bagratuni family in Armenia and Georgia

The earliest known members of the Armenian Bagratuni (or Bagratid) dynasty lived in the 4th century AD. The Georgian house of Bagrationi branched off from the Armenian Bagratunis.

== Kingdom of Armenia ==
The Bagratuni family became princes in the 4th century. Their heritable rights were given to them by the Arshakuni Dynasty, the kings of Armenia (52–428). They were called aspets and crowned Arshakuni kings. Their domain included the region of Sper in Upper Armenia, which was famous for its gold, and Tayk.

Smbat I was the first member of the dynasty. He was aspet during the reign of Armenia's first Christian king, Tiridates III the Great (287–330). The last Armenian king, who was crowned by Bagratunis, was Artaxias IV (423–428). The aspet was Smbat III, who was known from Vramshapuh king's times (389–415).

Family of Bagratuni family tree

Smbat I aspet († 314)
Bagrat I aspet (330–353)
Smbat II aspet (367–374)
Pap king (368–374)	Sahak I aspet (378–388)
Arshak III king (378–389)	Vagharshak	daughter	Smbat III aspet († 423)

=== Persian and Byzantine occupation ===
The ancestors of Smbat III were the most famous princes (nakharars) during the occupation of the Roman Empire and Sassanid Persia. Armenia had been divided between them since 387. Tirots, one of the ancestors of Smbat III, allied with Armenian marzbane. Sahak II and Smbat IV were marzbans of Armenia. The rulers of the dynasty traditionally continued to be "aspets".

After the second division of Armenia, the domains of the Bagratuni family became part of Byzantine Empire. Smbat IV was among the princes who rebelled against them.

Family of Bagratuni family tree

Smbat III aspet († 423)
Tirots prince († 450)
Sahak II marzban (481–482)
Sanpdiat aspet († 505)
Varaztirots I
Manvel aspet	Ashot I aspet († 560)
Smbat IV marzban (604–616)	Pap prince († 596)
Varaz-Sahak	Varaztirots II; Armenian prince (628–634)
Smbat prince († 643)	Smbat V aspet († 646)

=== Arab caliphate ===
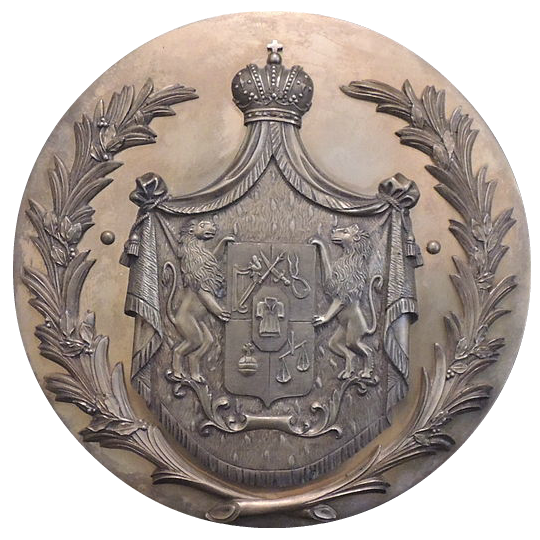
Coat of arms of Bagrationi dynasty, Georgian branch of Bagratunis

During the Arabic period (7–9th centuries), the Bagratuni family was one of the most powerful princely dynasties of Armenia. Their main competitors were sparapets of the Mamikonian family who were Byzantine-oriented. Princes of Armenia were chosen from these two families and sometimes the people, who were under their influence. Princes were the second most powerful people after the ostikan.

The competition was ended by the victory of Bagratunis, who founded an independent kingdom. First, the title of Prince of Armenia changed to Prince of Princes. Then, the prince of princes became sparapets who were the constables of the army. In the beginning of the 9th century, a powerful prince, Ashot Msaker, united Taron, Tayk and Ayrarat, taking them under his control and thus making them part of his domain. Later, he united Moxoene, Gugark, Georgia and Caucasian Albania. He then took over Artsrunis of Vaspurakan and Syunis of Syunik. As a result, all of Arminiya came under his control.

Princes of Armenia and sparapets were from the family of Smbat VIII. His son, Ashot, became the king of Armenia. Sons of Bagarat II, brother of Smbat VIII, became the princes of Taron. Their sister, Hripsime, became the princess of principality of Vaspurakan. Her husband was the first prince Hamazasp II, Artsruni.

Before independence, the Tayk of Bagratuni became an independent principality. Its ruler, Ashot, became the head of the Georgian Bagrationi dynasty. It ruled in Georgia for one thousand years (9–19th centuries).

The last prince of Armenia was Ashot (855–885), son of Smbat VIII, who later became the first king (885–890).

Family of Bagratuni family tree

Smbat V aspet 646
Varaztirots III († 670)	Ashot II (684–689)
Smbat VI (693–726)	Ashot	Vasak	Bagrat	Smbat prince († 705)
Ashot III (732–748)	Sahak III (753–770)	Guaram III; Prince of Georgia (693–748)
Smbat VII (770–775)	Vasak	daughter
Ashot IV (790–826)	Gagik Artsruni; Prince of Vaspurakan († 800)	Adarnase I prince of Tao (780–807)
Sahak	Bagrat II (826–851)	Smbat VIII (852–855)	Hripsime	Hamazasp II prince of Vaspurakan (800–836)	Ashot I king of Georgia (813–830)
Taronites; Bagratunis of Taron (9–10th cent.); Tornikian family (10–12th cent.)	shahnshahs Bagratunis of Kars (963–1065); Kiurikian family (978–1113)	Artsruni; Princes of Vaspurakan (836–908); Kings (908–1021)	Bagrationi; Family Tree; Bagratunis of Tayk (813–1001); Georgian kings (1008–1801)

== Bagratid kingdom of Armenia ==
=== Bagratunis of Taron ===
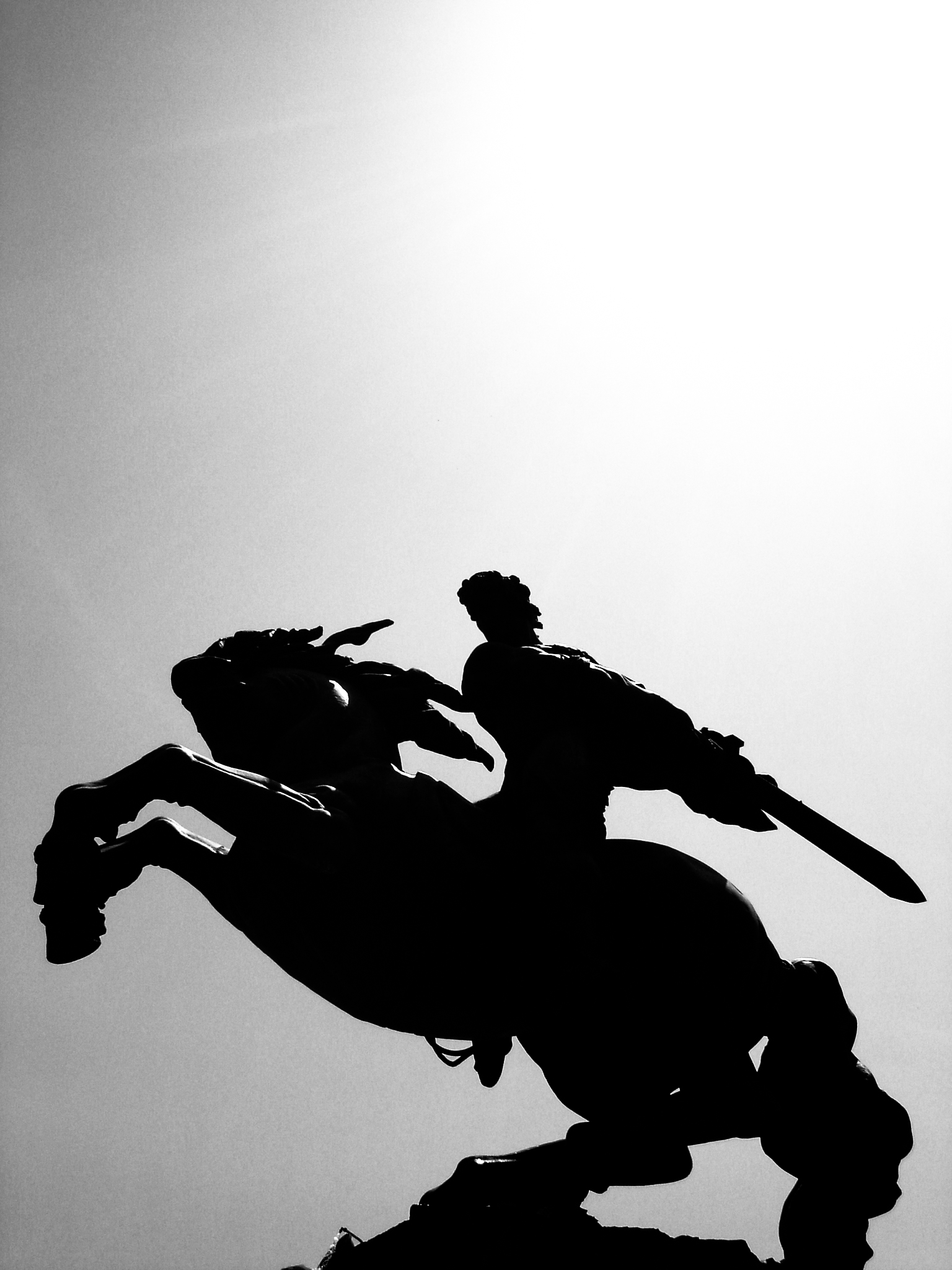
Sasuntzi Davith, the hero of Armenian epic poetry. According to one version, Ashot II and David Arkayik are the personages of creating him

Taron (Turuberan) became a part of Bagratunis' domain in the beginning of the 9th century, when Ashot Msaker was Prince of Armenia (790–826). As a prince of Taron, he is counted as Ashot I (804–826). After his death, prince of princes, Bagrat, inherited Taron, the south of the domain, and Smbat, Ayrarat, which was the northern part. Bagrat was the second in the dynasty. Bagrat I was an aspet in the 4th century. However, in Taron, he was the first Bagrat, so he ruled as Bagrat I of Taron (826–851), because there were no Bagrats before him. His sons and grandsons ruled until 966. After, Taron became a part of Byzantine Empire.

Previous seniors, princes of Taron, of the Mamikonian family, were strong in the region, even during the ruling of the last prince, Ashot III. They became relatives with the Bagratunis, and as a result of that, there were two more princes in Taron in his last days. They were Bagrat III and Grigor II, who were half-Mamikonians and half-Bagratunis. Later, the Tronite branch of the Bagratunis and Mamikonians became one family. Some of them ruled in Sasun (Tornikians) and the others in Moush (Taronites).

Family of Bagratuni family tree

Bagrat I (826–851)
Ashot I (855–878)	David Arkayik (878–895)	Tornik
Gurgen (895–895)	Ashot ΙΙ	Grigor I (895–936)	Apoganem
Bagrat II (936–987)	Ashot III (936–966)	Tornikian family
Grigor II (936–987)	Bagrat III (998–1020)	Gregory Taronites
Taronites family

=== Kings of Armenia ===
After the death of Ashot Msaker (826) and Bagrat II Bagratuni (851), Smbat VIII became the prince of Armenia. His family was the ruling royal family for 200 years, in Armenia, Georgia and Albania. Because of this long rule, they were called king of kings (shahnshah).

flag, Bagratuni dynasty

The son of Smbat VIII, Ashot, became the first Bagratuni king. He had four sons and three daughters, whom he married to Artsruni and Syuni princes. Thus, the strongest families of Armenia became one family and began to rule the country. Ashot's brother, Shapuh, became sparapet, the constable of the Armenian army. The capital was Bagaran, which was throne-city of Ashot Msaker (790–826). Ashot's son, Smbat (890–914), moved the capital to Yerazgavors. It was the capital for about forty years until King Abas moved it to Kars.

Ashot III the Merciful, king of Armenia (953–977), built a new capital around the fortress of Ani. It was the last capital of the Armenian kingdom, so it is also called Kingdom of Ani. His brother, Mushegh, stayed in Kars and founded Kingdom of Kars (963–1065) under the sovereignty of Ashot III. Later, the king of Armenia, Smbat II, allowed his brother Gurgen to organize a new kingdom in north which became the Kingdom of Tashir-Dzoraget (978–1113). Smbat Syuni did the same in the east creating the Kingdom of Syunik-Baghk.

The third son of Ashot III, Gagik, was the last powerful king of Armenia (990–1020). After his death, the kingdom was divided into two parts, between the brothers, Hovhannes-Smbat and Ashot. The last king was Gagik II (1042–1045), son of Ashot.

In 1079, Gagik II was killed. In 1080, Gagik of Kars and his sons, Hovhannes and David, also died. The son of Hovhannes, Ashot, was also killed in Ani. As a result, the royal branch of the Bagratunis ended with Ani and Kars. The last royal branch, the Kiurikian family, remained in Lori.

Armenian prince Ruben killed the murderers of Gagik II and inherited the throne from him. In 1080, he founded the Armenian principality of Cilicia (1080–1198), which became a kingdom (1198–1375).

Consequently, the royal heritage of the Armenian Bagratuni family is either Georgian Bagrationis, or Rubinians, Hetumids and Lusignans in Cilicia, or the Kiurikians.

Smbat VIII (852–855)	Hripsime
Katranide I	Ashot I (855–885) (885–890)	Smbat	Shapuh	Mushegh	Abas	two daughters
Smbat the Martyr (890–914)	Sahak	David	Shapuh sparapet
Sofya	Grigor Artsruni Vaspurakan (857–887)	daughter	Vahan Artsruni	Mariam	Vasak Syuni Syunik (855–859)
Ashot Vaspurakan (898–904)	Gagik prince and king of Vaspurakan (904–908, 908–943)	Gurgen; Parskahayk (904–925)	Grigor Syunik (859–913)	Sahak	Vasak
Ashot the Iron (914–928)	Sahakanuysh Sevada	Abas I (928–953)	Gagik Vaspurakan (897–898)	son	Ashot sparapet
Khosrovanuysh	Ashot III (953–977)	Mushegh I Kars (963–984)	daughter of Sevada II
Smbat II (977–990)	Gagik I (990–1020)	Katranide II	Gurgen Lori (978–989)	Abas I Kars (984–1029)	Gourandukht Rubinyan
Senekerim Artsruni Vaspurakan (1003–1021)	Khushush	Hovhannes-Smbat (1022–1041)	Ashot the Brave (1022–1040)	Abas	Kiurikians	Gagik I Kars (1029–1065)
daughter of David Artsruni	Gagik II	Mariam
Hovhannes	David	daughter of Ablgarib Artsruni
Ashot († 1080)

=== Kiurikians ===
coat of arms, Bagratuni dynasty

The Kiurikians were a royal and princely family from Armenia from the 10th through 14th centuries. The founder is Gurgen or Kiurike, son of Ashot III the Merciful (953–977). At first, they ruled only in Tashir-Dzoraget (Lori Province) but later in Tavush as well. Grandsons of Gurgen-Kiurike were kings of Tashir-Dzoraget and eastern Georgia (Kingdom of Kakheti).

In the 12th century, Kakhety and Lori annexed to Georgia. The Kiurikians remained in Tavush. Later they divided into Matsnaberd and Nor-berd branches. The last prince, Sargis of Matsnaberd, ruled in the 13th century. Nothing is known about him, his parents (probably Aghsartan), or their offspring.

Gurgen (978–989) Lori
David I (989–1048) Lori
Kiurike II (1048–1089) Lori	Gagik († 1058) Kakhet
David II (1089–1113) Lori	Abas I (1089–1113) Lori	Aghsartan I († 1084) Kakhet
Kiurike III Tavush	Kiurike IV († 1102) Kakhet
Abas II Tavush	Aghsartan II († 1105) Kakhet
Aghsartan I Matsnaberd	Vasak I Nor Berd
Kiurike IV Matsnaberd	David III Nor Berd
Pahlavan Matsnaberd	Taghaiddin Matsnaberd	Aghsartan II Matsnaberd	Vasak II Nor Berd

== See also ==
- Origin of the Bagratid dynasties

== Sources ==
- Cyril Toumanoff, Manuel de Généalogie et de Chronologie pour l'Histoire de la Caucasie Chrétienne (Arménie-Géorgie-Albanie)
- Toumanoff, Cyril. Iberia on the Eve of Bagratid Rule.
- Laurent, Joseph L. (1919). L'Arménie entre Byzance et l'Islam, depuis la conquête arabe jusqu'en 886. Paris: De Boccard. pp. 117–118.
- Ter-Ghevondyan, Aram Nahapeti (1965). Արաբական ամիրայությունները Բագրատունյաց Հայաստանում [The Arab Emirates in Bagratid Armenia]. Yerevan: Armenian SSR Academy of Sciences Press.
- Yeghiazaryan, A. S. (2014). Աշոտ Ա Բագրատունի. թագավոր Հայոց (թագադրության թվականը և գահակալության տարիները) [Ashot I Bagratuni: King of Armenians (Coronation Year and Years of Reign)] (in Armenian). Yerevan: YSU Press. p. 80. ISBN 978-5-8084-1850-9.
- Yeghiazaryan, Arman. Աշոտ Դ Բագրատունի «Մսակեր». համապարփակ պատմագիտական ակնարկ [Ashot IV Bagratuni "Msaker": Comprehensive Historiographical Review] (in Armenian).
- Thomas Artsruni and Anonymous (1978). Պատմութիւն Տանն Արծրունեաց [History of the House of Artsruni] (in Armenian). Yerevan.
- Matthew of Edessa (1973). Ժամանակագրություն [Chronography] (in Armenian). Yerevan: Hayastan Press.
- Vardanyan, Sergey (1985). Հայոց մայրաքաղաքները [The Capitals of Armenia] (in Armenian). Yerevan: Sovetakan Grogh. pp. 82–83.
- Minorsky, V. (1953). Studies in Caucasian History. CUP Archive. p. 102.
- Peacock, Andrew C. S. (2010). Early Seljūq History: A New Interpretation. Routledge Studies in the History of Iran and Turkey, Vol. 7. Routledge. p. 131.
- Hakobyan, Tadevos (1966). Սյունիքի թագավորությունը (պատմա-աշխարհագրական առումով) [The Kingdom of Syunik (Historical-Geographical Aspect)] (in Armenian). Yerevan. p. 3.
- Hovannisian, Richard G. (1997). The Armenian People from Ancient to Modern Times. New York: St. Martin's Press. ISBN 978-0-312-10169-5.
- Edwards, Robert W. (1987). The Fortifications of Armenian Cilicia. Dumbarton Oaks Studies No. 23. Washington, D.C.: Dumbarton Oaks, Trustees for Harvard University. pp. vii–xxxi, 3–288. ISBN 0884021637.
- Kurdoghlian, Mihran (1996). Պատմութիւն Հայոց [History of Armenia], Volume II (in Armenian). Athens: National Educational Council Press. pp. 43–44.
- Armenian Soviet Encyclopedia (1974). Yerevan: Armenian SSR Academy of Sciences, Main Editorial Board of the Armenian Soviet Encyclopedia.
- Suny, Ronald Grigor (1994). The Making of the Georgian Nation: 2nd edition. Bloomington: Indiana University Press. p. 27. ISBN 0-253-20915-3.
- Rapp, Stephen H. (2003). Studies in Medieval Georgian Historiography: Early Texts and Eurasian Contexts. Leuven: Peeters. p. 383. ISBN 90-429-1318-5.
- Grousset, René. Histoire de l'Arménie (in French). Paris: Payot.
- Mikaberidze, Alexander (2015). Historical Dictionary of Georgia. Lanham, Md.: Rowman & Littlefield. p. 172. ISBN 978-1-4422-4146-6. OCLC 916450044.
- Bloom, Jonathan M.; Blair, Sheila, eds. (2009). The Grove Encyclopedia of Islamic Art and Architecture, Volume 3. Oxford: Oxford University Press. p. 371. ISBN 978-0-19-530991-1.
