= Arab invasion of Armenia =

Arab Rashidun Caliphate conquest of Armenia

- Part of the Arab–Byzantine wars
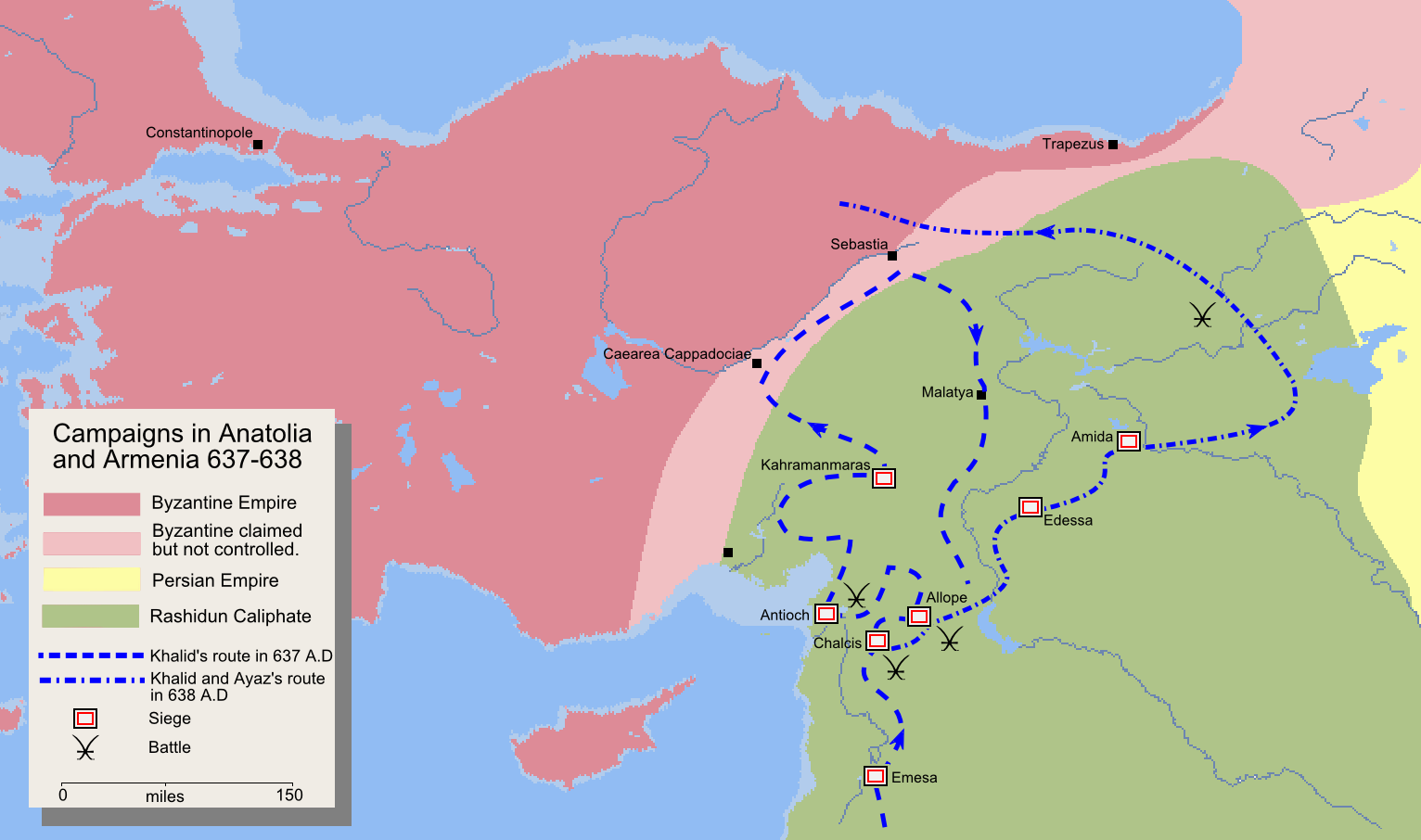
- Arab invasions of Byzantine Armenia in Anatolia
Date	639–661
Location	Byzantine Armenia
Result	Rashidun victory
Territorial changes	Establishment of the Emirate of Armenia

Belligerents
Rashidun Caliphate	Byzantine Empire; Byzantine Armenia; Sasanian Empire; Sasanian Armenia; Khazaria

Commanders and leaders
Muawiya ibn Abi Sufyan; Iyad ibn Ghanim; Salman ibn Rabiah	Heraclius; Constans II; Theodore Rshtuni; Sarvand ibn Boulos (surrendered) al-Rumi Mauryan †; Bargik tarkhan †; Tuman Shah (surrendered)

Strength
Unknown	100,000

Casualties and losses
Unknown	Unknown killed 35,000 captured

The Arab invasion of Armenia was a series of military campaigns conducted in 639–661 CE by the Rashidun Caliphate against the Byzantine Empire in Byzantine Armenia as part of the wider early Muslim conquests and centuries-long Arab–Byzantine wars.

The first Arab raids into the country occurred in 639/640. At that time, the Byzantine and Sasanian parts of Armenia had just been united under the Byzantine-aligned Armenian prince Theodore Rshtuni. Several Arab attacks and Byzantine-Armenian counterattacks occurred in the 640s. In 652, facing a renewed Arab assault, Rshtuni broke with the Byzantines and made an agreement with Mu'awiya, who was then governor of Syria, and accepted Muslim rule. Rshtuni's death in 654 and Arab internal conflicts after 656 temporarily weakened Arab control over Armenia, but Arab rule was decisively reasserted after Mu'awiya's accession as caliph in 661.

== Source matter ==
The details of the early conquest of Armenia by the Arabs are uncertain, as the various Arabic, Greek, and Armenian sources contradict each other. The main sources for the period are the eyewitness account of the Armenian bishop Sebeos, along with the history of the 8th-century Armenian priest Łewond. The Muslim historians al-Tabari and Ya'qubi also provide information about the period, but the main source is the 9th-century scholar al-Baladhuri, who, unusually for a Muslim writer, included much information drawn from local accounts from Armenia.

== Arab raids and conquest of Armenia ==
In 639, just before the first Arab raids into Armenia, the Byzantine and Sasanian sections of Armenia were united under the Armenian nobleman Theodore Rshtuni, the sparapet (commander-in-chief) of Persian Armenia. Armenian politics were traditionally dominated by several powerful noble houses, and the instability prevailing in the mid-7th century provoked greater competition between their leaders.

According to the Arabic sources, the first Arab expedition reached Armenia in 639/640, on the heels of their conquest of the Levant from the Byzantines and the start of the Muslim conquest of Persia. The Arabs were led by Iyad ibn Ghanim, who had previously conquered Upper Mesopotamia, and penetrated as far as Bitlis. A second expedition occurred in 642, when the Muslim army advanced and divided into four corps up to northeastern Anatolia, only to be defeated and pushed out of the country. After this setback, the Arabs only undertook a raid from Caucasian Albania in 645, led by Salman ibn Rabiah, but this only touched the Anatolian borderlands. It was not until 645/646 that a major campaign to subdue the country was undertaken by Mu'awiya, the governor of Syria. Mu'awiya's general Habib ibn Maslama al-Fihri first moved against the Byzantine portion of the country: he besieged and captured Theodosiopolis (present-day Erzurum, Turkey) and defeated a Byzantine army, reinforced with Khazar and Alan troops, on the Euphrates. He then turned towards Lake Van, where the local Armenian princes of Akhlat and Moks submitted, allowing Habib to march onto Dvin, the capital of the former Persian portion of Armenia. Dvin capitulated after a few days of siege, as did Tiflis further north in Caucasian Iberia. During the same time, another Arab army from Iraq, under Salman ibn Rabi'a, conquered parts Caucasian Iberia (Arran).

The Armenian sources however provide a different narrative, both in chronology and in the details of the events, although the broad thrust of the Arab campaigns is consistent with the Muslim sources. The Armenian historians report that the Arabs first arrived in 642, penetrating up to the central region of Ayrarat, and sacked Dvin, returning with over 35,000 captives. In 643, the Arabs invaded again, from the direction of Azerbaijan, ravaged Ayrarat and reached the Anatolian peninsula, but were defeated in battle by Theodore Rshtuni and forced back. After this success, Rshtuni was recognized as ruler of Armenia by the Byzantine emperor Constans II. At some point soon after, the Armenians recognized Byzantine suzerainty.

When Constans' truce with the Arabs ended in 653, however, and a new Arab invasion became likely, Rshtuni voluntarily agreed to submit to Muslim overlordship. In response, Emperor Constantine in person led an army of reportedly 100,000 men into Anatolia and Armenia. The local princes rallied to him, and both Armenia and Iberia returned to Byzantine allegiance. After spending the winter in Dvin, Constans left in spring 654. An Arab army invaded and captured the regions on the northern shore of Lake Van soon after. With their assistance, Rshtuni evicted the Byzantine garrisons from Armenia and secured Arab recognition as presiding prince of Armenia and parts of Albania. The Byzantines under general Maurianos tried to recover control of the region, but without success. In 655, even parts Byzantine Armenia was invaded, and the Arabs occupied Theodosiopolis (Arabic Qaliqala) and cemented their control of the country by taking Rshtuni to Damascus, where he died in 656, and appointing his rival Hamazasp IV Mamikonian in his stead. However, with the outbreak of the First Muslim Civil War in 657, effective Arab authority in the country ceased, and Mamikonian returned to Byzantine overlordship almost immediately.

These events are merged into the single campaign of 645/646 in the Arabic sources, who omit any detail about the internal affairs of Armenia or the recognition of Byzantine suzerainty there, and portray the country as being firmly under Arab suzerainty since Habib al-Fihri's campaign. Modern historians generally consider the contemporary account of Sebeos (which is partly corroborated by the Byzantine chronicler Theophanes the Confessor) to be more reliable, and have proposed different reconstructions of the early Arab raids between 640 and 650, based on a critical reading of the sources; it is clear, however, that the country did not submit to Arab rule at this time.

In 661, however, Mu'awiya, now the victor of the Muslim civil war, ordered the Armenian princes to re-submit to his authority and pay tribute. In order to avoid another war, the princes complied.

== Armenia within the Caliphate ==
Theodore Rshtuni and other Armenian nakharars (lords) accepted Arab rule over Armenia. Constans II, the Byzantine Emperor, sent occasional reinforcements to Armenia, but they were inadequate. The commander of the city of Dvin, Smbat, confronted by the fact that he could no longer hold out against the Islamic army, submitted to Caliph Omar, consenting to pay him tribute.

In 644, Omar was assassinated by a Persian slave and was replaced by Caliph Uthman. The Armenian acceptance of Arab rule irritated the Byzantines. Emperor Constans sent his men to Armenia in order to impose the Chalcedonian creed of Christianity. He did not succeed in his doctrinal objective, but the new Armenian prefect, Hamazasp, who regarded the taxes imposed by the Muslims as too heavy, yielded to the Emperor.

Armenia remained under Arab rule for approximately 200 years, formally starting in 645 CE. Through many years of Umayyad and Abbasid rule, the Armenian Christians benefited from political autonomy and relative religious freedom, but were considered second-class citizens (dhimmi status). This was, however, not the case in the beginning. The invaders first tried to force the Armenians to accept Islam, prompting many citizens to flee to Byzantine-held Armenia, which the Muslims had largely left alone due to its rugged and mountainous terrain. The policy also caused several uprisings until the Armenian Church finally enjoyed greater recognition even more than it experienced under Byzantine or Sassanid jurisdiction. The Caliph assigned Ostikans as governors and representatives, who sometimes were of Armenian origin. The first ostikan, for example, was Theodorus Rshtuni. However, the commander of the 15,000-strong army was always of Armenian origin, often from the Mamikonian, Bagratuni or Artsruni families, with the Rshtuni family having the highest number of troops at 10,000. He would either defend the country from foreigners, or assist the Caliph in his military expeditions. For example, the Armenians helped the Caliphate against Khazar invaders.

Arab rule was interrupted by many revolts whenever Arabs attempted to enforce Islam, or higher taxes (jizya) to the people of Armenia. However, these revolts were sporadic and intermittent. They never had a pan-Armenian character. Arabs used rivalries between the different Armenian nakharars in order to curb the rebellions. Thus, the Mamikonian, Rshtuni, Kamsarakan and Gnuni families were gradually weakened in favor of the Bagratuni and Artsruni families. The rebellions led to the creation of the legendary character, David of Sassoun.

During Islamic rule, Arabs from other parts of the Caliphate settled in Armenia. By the 9th century, there was a well-established class of Arab emirs, more or less equivalent to the Armenian nakharars.

At the end of this period, in 885, the Bagratid Kingdom of Armenia was established with Ashot I, a Christian king, as the first monarch. The Byzantine Empire and the Abbasid Caliphate's willingness to recognize the existence of the kingdom stemmed from the need to maintain a buffer state between them. Particularly for the Caliphate, Armenia was more desirable as a buffer rather than a province due to the threat of the Khazars, who were allied with Byzantium. Ashot's regime and those who succeeded him ushered in a period of peace, artistic growth, and literary activity. This era is referred to as the second Armenian Golden Age and is manifested in the magnificent churches built and the illustrated manuscripts created during the period.

== See also ==
- Persian Armenia
- Byzantine Armenia
- Bagratuni dynasty
- Muslim conquest of Persia
- Arab–Byzantine wars

== Sources ==
- Canard, Marius & Cahen, Claude (1960). "Armīniya". In Gibb, H. A. R.; Kramers, J. H.; Lévi-Provençal, E.; Schacht, J.; Lewis, B. & Pellat, Ch. (eds.). The Encyclopaedia of Islam, Second Edition. Volume I: A–B. Leiden: E. J. Brill. pp. 634–640. doi:10.1163/1573-3912_islam_COM_0064. OCLC 495469456.
- Dadoyan, Seta B. (2011). The Armenians in the Medieval Islamic World: The Arab Period in Arminiyah, Seventh to Eleventh Centuries. Transaction Publishers. ISBN 9781412846523.
- Garsoïan, Nina (1997). "The Arab Invasions and the Rise of the Bagratuni (640–884)". In Hovannisian, Richard G. (ed.). The Armenian People from Ancient to Modern Times. Vol. 1. New York: St. Martin's Press. ISBN 0-312-10169-4.
- Ter-Ghewondyan, Aram (1976) [1965]. The Arab Emirates in Bagratid Armenia. Translated by Garsoïan, Nina. Lisbon: Livraria Bertrand.
