= Ashot III Bagratuni =

Armenian noble

Ashot III Bagratuni Աշոտ Բ Բագրատունի

Sper and Tayk prince (726-750) armenian prince 732-748
- Predecessor: Smbat VI Bagratuni
- Successor: Saahak III Bagratuni
- Born: c. unknown
- Died: c. 761
- Dynasty: Bagratuni
- Father: Vasak Bagratuni

Armenian Feudal Kingdoms, 1000 AD

Ashot III Bagratuni also known as Ashot the Blind (Armenian: Աշոտ Կուրացյալ), was the Prince of Armenia from 732 to 748. He was appointed to this position by Marwan, the governor of Arminiya. He pursued a policy of rapprochement with the Umayyad Caliphate. He was the grandson of Varaz-Tirots Bagratuni and the son of Vasak Bagratuni. He had two sons, Smbat and Vasak. Smbat continued his father’s branch of the dynasty and inherited the greater part of his paternal estates. Vasak received Tayk as his share; he later married the daughter of the Georgian prince Guaram III and founded the genealogical branch of the Bagratid dynasty that became known as the Bagrationi. Thus, Tayk became an independent political entity under the leadership of the Armenian-Georgian Bagratids. The Armenian prince died in Dariunq. Beginning with his son Smbat, who held the title of sparapet, the Armenian Bagratids ruled Armenia hereditarily.

== History ==
In 701, the Arab Caliphate conquered Armenia and, together with Iberia (Georgia) and Albania, established the administrative province of Arminiya. The final consolidation of Arab rule in Armenia worsened the situation not only of the population but also of the princely class. Unable to influence the course of events in any way, the Armenian princes attempted to escape Arab rule by emigrating to Byzantium. At the same time, the struggle among the Armenian princely houses for political supremacy in the country was gaining new momentum. If this rivalry had not openly manifested itself in previous centuries, then from the beginning of the 8th century the struggle for political power between the two powerful princely houses—the Mamikonians and the Bagratunis—had reached its peak. For centuries, the Mamikonians had fought for the independence of Armenia. After the fall of the Arsacid dynasty, there had been no popular uprising against foreign domination in which they had not participated, suffering numerous casualties in the process. Therefore, they could not tolerate the policy of the Bagratuni princes, who sought at all costs to accommodate themselves to the rulers of the time. To achieve their objectives, the Mamikonians relied on their own strength and, traditionally, on the ineffective assistance of Byzantium. The Bagratunis, with the exception of the spontaneously developing events of 703, consistently managed to reach an understanding with the rulers of the region and, as will be seen below, expanded their domains at the expense of other Armenian principalities. The Bagratunis eliminated rival and ambitious ancient princely families through the agency of the Arabs, replacing them with a new nobility that was favorable to their interests. By the beginning of the 8th century, they were already competing with the Mamikonians, the largest landowners in Armenia. However, the majority of the Armenian nobility remained under Mamikonian influence, while the Bagratunis used the Arabs and their military forces to oppose the Mamikonians and seize political power in Armenia completely. The Arabs, for their part, seeking a strong base of support in Armenia, were naturally inclined to favor the Bagratunis rather than the Mamikonians.

== The Glorious Past of the Bagratuni Dynasty ==
There are s small number of princely houses such as the Bagratunis—a centuries-old and imperial dynasty in the Arab world. The rebellion that erupted in the second half of the 8th century had weakened the military strength of the Armenians. The Mamikonian lions were bidding their final farewell to Armenian political life leaving the field to their opponents and rivals, the Bagratuni princes. It was certainly not prudent on the part of the Mamikonians to anticipate the future and openly confront the enemy at a time when, although already on the path to decline, the latter was still sufficiently powerful to suppress attempts at disobedience. It was necessary to wait for the approaching moment of exhaustion in order to achieve success, and especially to achieve it without great sacrifice. The Bagratunis followed and brought to fruition a policy whose foundations had been laid by Ashot Bagratuni the Blind, who sacrificed the light of his eyes for the sake of his homeland. Through persistent effort, far-sighted prudence, careful assessment of circumstances, neglecting no available means and resorting to arms when necessary, the descendants of Ashot the Blind were able to gain respect for the Armenian name and place crowns not only upon their native land but beyond its borders as well. The Bagratuni dynasty spread its vast branches over Armenia and the neighboring lands. It was the first attempt to unite the Armenians, Georgians, Albanians, and other subject peoples in a bond of solidarity under the protection of the Bagratuni dynasty. Notably, the Georgian national chronicle, Kartlis Tskhovreba, opens with the famous statement that the Armenians, Georgians, Albanians, Mingrelians, Lezgins, and other Caucasian peoples constitute one family and descend from the giant Torgom, who settled at the foot of Mount Ararat.

According to Adontz, one of the nephews of Atrnerseh the Blind, named Atrnerseh, came to Archil, while his other three nephews, who had wronged their uncle, left Taron and went to Shakikh, where they settled in the vicinity of the same Archil. During the time of Ashot the Blind, Taron was still in the hands of the Mamikonians, and therefore the princes leaving that region could not have been relatives of Atrnerseh. Those who departed from Taron were the nephews of Atrnerseh. If Shakikh is the same as Shaki, then the passage refers to Sahak Smbatyan, who was of Bagratuni origin and was the lord of Shaki. Atrnerseh the Blind himself was Ashot the Patrician, who became blind in 749. It is also clear that Atrnerseh, the nephew of Atrnerseh the Blind, who came from Armenia to Archil, was Vasak, the son of Ashot the Blind. Vasak’s brother, Smbat the Sparapet, was the ancestor of the new period of the Bagratuni dynasty in Armenia, while Vasak himself laid the foundation for the Bagratuni dynasty in Georgia.

== Period of Rule ==
In 726, six years after the death of Smbat Bagratuni, Ashot Bagratuni was appointed Prince of Armenia (732–748). The Mamikonians, who for centuries had been at the forefront of the country’s political life and, since the 5th century, had been among the principal landowners of Armenia, could no longer tolerate the restriction of their rights in the administration of the country. Ashot had not only been appointed Prince of Armenia, but also performed the duties of the sparapet, a position that had traditionally belonged hereditarily to the Mamikonians.

Using the power concentrated in his hands and considering the circumstances favorable, Ashot Bagratuni decided to finally rid himself of his dynasty’s long-standing rivals. The Prince of Armenia first attempted to resolve the Mamikonian problem through the Arabs, against whom the sons of Smbat Mamikonian, Grigor and David, were actively involved. The historian Ghevont, apparently displaying a biased attitude and openly defending the interests of the Bagratunis, states in this regard:

“And when the sons of Smbat learned of Ashot’s honor, because his person had grown great in the eyes of Heshm and the commander Marwan, they were greatly hostile toward him, until their disagreement reached the ears of the son of Muhammad. And he immediately ordered them to be seized and sent Grigor and David, who were of the Mamikonian family, to the ruler of the Ishmaelites, writing accusations against them that they were opponents and rebels against Ashot’s authority.”

The question arises as to when the two brothers could have had enough time during such a short period to demonstrate their dissatisfaction with the Prince of Armenia and his patron, the governor Marwan. The disobedience mentioned by the historian was apparently merely a pretext, and Ashot Bagratuni was using the Arabs to settle accounts with his political opponents, considering the moment favorable. The fate of the Mamikonian brothers had already been determined: they had to leave the political arena so that they would not obstruct the Arab appointee.

“And he ordered them to be taken to the place called Yeman, which is a desert, and to be placed in prison there until the end of their lives.” — Ghevont

However, as we shall see, subsequent events developed differently. Having rid himself of his rivals, the Prince of Armenia went to the caliph to receive the reward for his services. As in such cases, Ashot Bagratuni received a favorable reception, Ghevont reports. Shortly afterward, however, the situation in the region changed dramatically. The Arab Caliphate became embroiled in a succession struggle. In 743–744, three new rulers ascended and fell from the caliphal throne one after another. In these conflicts, temporary victory remained with Marwan, the governor of Arminiya, who proclaimed himself caliph in 744 and ruled until 750. During the succession struggles of 743–744, Grigor and David Mamikonian were also released from exile along with many others and returned to their homeland.

“And while the tumultuous uproar of the forces increasingly spread among the sons of Ishmael because of the impious war, then the sons of Smbat escaped from captivity, for they were released from prison by the order of Walid.”

However, they were unable to return immediately to their homeland from Syria and were arrested again. After long wanderings, the Mamikonian brothers eventually returned to their homeland, Vaspurakan. Taking advantage of the absence of the governor Marwan, they participated in the struggle for the caliphate. Considering the moment favorable, the Mamikonians began rallying around themselves the princely class dissatisfied with Arab rule. Ghevont states that the Mamikonian brothers committed acts of violence in Vaspurakan:

“…and they caused great turmoil throughout the country and endangered them through oppressive taxation and coercion.”

From the words of a historian who describes the events with apparent bias and adopts a hostile position toward the Mamikonians, it may be inferred that Grigor and David engaged in violence and forced tax collection among the Armenian population. This has led several scholars, at different times, to state that the Mamikonians oppressed their compatriots in Vaspurakan. However, in my view, this biased attitude and the views of other scholars should be considered within the context of the period and in light of the state interests of Armenia at that time.

Seeing that actual power in the country was in the hands of the anti-Arab faction, Ashot Bagratuni sheltered his family in the fortress of Dariunq and went himself to Marwan. In Syria, the Prince of Armenia participated in the succession struggles on Marwan’s side. Ghevont writes that Ashot commanded a cavalry force of approximately 15,000 men. In Syria, Ashot Bagratuni not only assisted Marwan but also managed to accuse the Mamikonian brothers. When Ashot’s patron, Marwan, emerged victorious and became caliph, Ashot’s position was once again strengthened. Through his actions, Ashot Bagratuni sought revenge against the Mamikonians for removing him from effective power. He portrayed the situation in Armenia to Marwan in such a way and accused Grigor and David Mamikonian so successfully that shortly afterward the caliph ordered the arrest of David Mamikonian. Not long afterward, David was killed on the orders of the Arabs.

Grigor Mamikonian understood that if he had not yet fallen victim to Ashot Bagratuni’s political intrigues, this was only temporary. Sooner or later, the Prince of Armenia would find a pretext to remove him from the political arena through the agency of the Arabs as well. In an attempt to deprive Grigor of full authority, he had already usurped the office of sparapet, which Grigor had held. After Marwan ascended the throne, unrest within the caliphate did not cease. Taking advantage of these circumstances, the Armenian princes attempted to revolt in order to cast off the Arab yoke. In 744, a rebellion broke out, as usual led by the Mamikonians. The rebels were also favored by the fact that, in addition to various regions of the caliphate, a revolt against the Arabs had also erupted in the territory of Caucasian Albania itself, which quickly spread to other areas, particularly Shamakhi. The leader of the rebellion, Grigor Mamikonian, fully aware that Ashot Bagratuni had been involved in the killing of his brother, nevertheless took no action against him, realizing that without the participation of the Prince of Armenia the revolt could not become a nationwide movement or produce the desired results. In the interests of the common cause, Grigor Mamikonian and his fellow princes persuaded the Prince of Armenia to join the anti-Arab movement. Ashot initially attempted to persuade the princes to take no action against the Arabs, naturally acting out of personal interests. Ashot and his dynasty, particularly with Arab patronage, had acquired an exceptional position in Armenia since the beginning of the 8th century in comparison with the other princely houses. Therefore, the Prince of Armenia had every reason to prevent any uprising against the caliphate, saying:

“And let us exact tribute from them as we have done until now, and let us keep our possessions, our vineyards, forests, and fields.”

Seeing that Ashot was hesitant, the princes, referring to the disastrous condition of the country, threatened to withdraw their military contingents, which were under the command of Ashot Bagratuni, who had taken the office of sparapet from Grigor Mamikonian. Seeing the determination of the princes and having no other choice—for if he refused, the princes would deprive him of the offices he held—Ashot decided to outwardly join the princely class. From the historian’s expression “all the princes of Armenia,” it can be inferred that the overwhelming majority of the Armenian nobility had rallied under the banner of Prince Grigor. At the initial stage, the rebels withdrew to the land of Tayk, intending to join the forces stationed in Pontus and launch an attack against the Arabs from there. According to Ghevont, an alliance of solidarity had previously been concluded between the Armenian rebels and the Byzantine emperor Constantine V Copronymus (741–775). However, a division soon arose among the rebels in Tayk, particularly among the princes. One of its principal causes was the fact that many representatives of the lower social classes joined the rebels. Alongside the struggle against foreign oppressors, they also raised the issue of combating internal exploitation.

Between 749 and 752, a rebellion broke out in Sasun, located near Taron, the hereditary domain of the Mamikonians, and rebellious sentiments spread there as well. Ashot Bagratuni, who had joined the rebellion under pressure, realizing that in the future he would have to answer to his masters—the Arabs—broke his oath and left the camp of his compatriots with the intention of “uniting with the sons of Ishmael.” He and the wavering princes fled to Bagrevand in order to establish contact with the Arabs from there and obtain their patronage. Upon learning of the flight of the Bagratuni prince, Grigor Mamikonian, as the leader of the rebellion, had to act according to the military situation, namely, to punish the Prince of Armenia. Ashot failed to reach his patrons; he was captured “in the province of Bagrevand, in the village of Hazr.” Grigor Mamikonian did not punish the Prince of Armenia as a result of a premeditated conspiracy, but because of the importance of the moment: Ashot’s action could have encouraged others to follow his example and discouraged the other princes. Therefore, in the village of Hazr, he punished the Prince of Armenia for betraying the common cause by blinding him. By the standards of the Middle Ages, this was a relatively mild punishment, since Ashot would undoubtedly have been sentenced to death for his actions. Afterward, Grigor Mamikonian moved the center of the rebellion to Karin, fortified the city, and continued the struggle from there. However, he unexpectedly fell ill and died. He was succeeded by Mushegh. Mushegh Mamikonian, who became Prince of Armenia in 749–752, ruled with the support of the princes and the backing of Byzantium.

== Family ==
Name	Years	Notes
Smbat V	646
Varaz-Tirots III	670	son of Smbat V
Ashot II, Prince of Armenia	684-689	son of Smbat V
Smbat VI, Prince of Armenia	693-726	son of Varaz-Tirots III
Ashot		son of Varaz-Tirots III
Vasak Bagratuni		son of Varaz-Tirots III
Bagrat		son of Varaz-Tirots III
Smbat, Prince	705	son of Ashot II
Ashot III, Prince of Armenia	732-748	son of Vasak
Sahak III,Prince of Armenia	753-770	son of Bagrat

== See also ==
- Ashot Bagratuni (other meanings)
- Bagratuni family tree

== Bibliography ==
- Grousset, René (1973). Histoire de l’Arménie des origines à 1071 (in French). Paris: Payot.
- Laurent, Joseph L. (1919). L'Arménie entre Byzance et l'Islam: depuis la conquête arabe jusqu'en 886 (in French). Paris: De Boccard.
- Toumanoff, Cyril (1963). Studies in Christian Caucasian History. Georgetown University Press.
- Տեր-Ղևոնդյան Ա․, Հայոց իշխանությունը արաբական տիրապետության ժամանակաշրջանում, «ՍՊԲ», 1964, № 2․
- Ղևոնդ, պատմություն, Երևան, 1982։
- Վարդան վարդապետ, Հաւաքումն պատմութեան Վենետիկ, 1862։
- Ադոնց, Բագրատունյաց փառքը, Փարիզ, 1948։

Preceded by Artavazd Kamsarakan	Bagratid Kingdom of Armenia; Ashot III Bagratuni; 732-748	Succeeded by Mushegh VI Mamikonian

Ashot III Bagratuni Sper and Tayk prince Born: unknown
Preceded by Smbat VI Bagratuni	Ashot III Bagratuni; 726-750	Succeeded by Sahak III Bagratuni
