= Smbat VII Bagratuni =

Armenian noble

- Reign: 761–775
- Died: 25 April 775
- House: Bagratuni
- Father: Ashot III Bagratuni

Smbat VII Bagratuni, Armenian commander (753-775), Armenian prince (770-775). Son of Ashot Kuratsyal, father of Ashot Msaker, from the Bagratuni princely dynasty.

== Biography ==
During the reign of the Armenian prince Sahak Bagratuni in 753, he became a commander, and after his death, also an Armenian prince (patrician). In 768, he participated in the Church Council of Partavi, convened by Catholicos Sion I of Bavones. In 774, the policeman Hasan took Smbat and other ministers with him, after which he began pursuing the rebel Artavazd Mamikonian, reaching the Samtskheta province of Virk. Then, in 774, he joined the rebel movement led by Musheg Mamikonian against the Arab Caliphate and won a series of victorious battles. He died at the Battle of Ardzni, in an unequal battle against the Arabs.

Smbat married the sister of Prince Samvel Mamikonian of Taron (d. 775). They had two sons, and it is believed that a third was born.

== Rebellion ==
In 774, a military clash occurred between the Arminian province and the Arab Caliphate. The movement, which began in 774, was supported by the majority of Armenian ministers, and the bitter conflict between ministerial dynasties did not find expression here. Enthusiasm reached such a level that the rebellion's supporters were able to attract the Armenian general Smbat Bagratuni, whose inclusion would naturally significantly enhance the movement's standing in the eyes of the people. A ministerial meeting was convened to discuss the uprising. It was decided to rise up against the Abbasids, vowing to fight and die together.

However, the rebellion also had its opponents, foremost among them Ashot, the son of Sahak Bagratuni. The historian Ghevond, who was favorably disposed toward Ashot Bagratuni, recalls in detail his words to the Armenian ministers. Ashot advised against the reckless appeals of enthusiastic preachers, as the many-headed dragon, the Arab Caliphate, was at the height of its power. He reminded everyone that even the mighty Byzantine Empire was powerless against the military might of the Caliphate and expressed surprise at whom the rebels relied, warning that they were ultimately destined to become refugees and seek refuge in Byzantine territories.

Probably succumbing to the influence of Ashot Bagratuni, some ministers adopted a neutral stance. Hamazasp Artsruni, along with his brothers and warriors, retreated to the fortress of Vaspurakan. Vasak Bagratuni, Ashot's son, along with the princes Amatuni and Truni, fortified themselves in the fortress of Daruynk and on the eastern side of Maku. According to Ghevond, they went out for provisions and then locked themselves back in their fortresses. Apparently, the princes of Syunik also did not participate in the uprising; their names are not mentioned during the uprising.The winter of 774-775 was favorable for the Armenian rebels, who had already occupied strong positions in central Armenia, in much of Ayrarat and Turuberan. A large army gathered around Smbat Bagratuni and Mushegh Mamikonian, a significant portion of which likely consisted of cavalry, as the commander himself led the rebellion. Mushegh Mamikonian was also joined by a large number of peasants fleeing high taxes and coming to him.

The leader of the rebellion, Mushegh Mamikonian, the Armenian generals Smbat Bagratuni and Sahak Bagratuni, Father Manuel of Mamikon, Vahan Gnuni, and many others, both ministers and ramiks. The number of victims was so great that, as the historian Ghevond wrote, there was not enough land to bury them, and they were left to lie in the open air, exposed to sun and dust, rain and storm.

Smbat Sparapet participated in the 775 rebellion, possibly because he was Mamikonian's son-in-law. This move could have undermined the Arab government's trust in the Bagratunis.

Preceded by Sahak VII Bagratuni	Presiding prince of Armenia under Abbasid suzerainty 761–775	Vacant Title next held by Ashot Msaker
