= Smbat VI Bagratuni =

Armenian prince and presiding prince of Armenia (c. 670–726)

- Presiding Prince of Armenia
- Reign: 691 – 726 (with interruptions)
- Predecessor: Nerses Kamsarakan
- Successor: Ashot III Bagratuni
- Born: c. 670
- Died: c. 726
- Issue: Ashot (presiding prince, 732–748); Vasak; Bagrat; Smbat (perished in the Nakhchivan massacre, 705)
- Dynasty: Bagratuni
- Father: Varaz-Tirots III Bagratuni
- Religion: Christianity

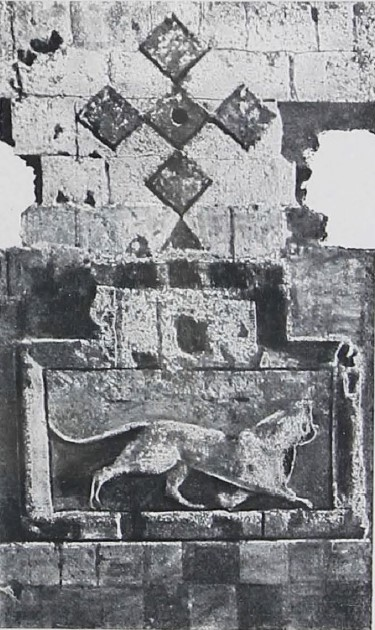
The Bagratunis’ Lion symbol on the gates of Ani.

Smbat VI Bagratuni (Armenian: Սմբատ Զ Բագրատունի; c. 670 – c. 726) was a prominent Armenian prince of the Bagratuni dynasty, serving as presiding prince of Armenia with interruptions from 691 until the 710s. During his reign, he frequently shifted alliances between the Byzantine Empire and the Umayyad Caliphate, receiving the Byzantine title of kouropalates. He was the son of Varaz-Tirots III Bagratuni and the uncle of Ashot III Bagratuni. His rule coincided with the height of the Arab–Byzantine conflict in the South Caucasus, during which he demonstrated military skill and diplomatic flexibility while remaining a defender of Armenian statehood and the Armenian Church.

== Historical context ==
In the early 690s, Armenia was in turmoil, as the country was disputed between the Byzantine Empire and the Umayyad Caliphate. Taking advantage of the Second Fitna civil war, Emperor Justinian II invaded Armenia and installed his own candidate, Nerses Kamsarakan, as its presiding prince, while Kamsarakan's predecessor, Ashot II Bagratuni, had been killed in 690 fighting against an Arab invasion. Armenian sources, notably the History of Łewond, accuse the Byzantine troops of pillaging the country, taking hostages for ransom, and attempting to impose communion between the Miaphysite Armenian Church and the Chalcedonian Byzantine Church. According to Łewond, the Byzantines exerted not only military but also religious pressure, seeking to uproot the ancient traditions of the Armenian Church. As a result, the Armenians soon came to see the Arabs as liberators. Hovhannes Draskhanakerttsi notes in his History of Armenia that the Bagratunis played a pivotal role in this period, gradually displacing the Kamsarakans and other noble houses. Movses Kaghankatvatsi complements this picture by presenting regional events and the impact of Khazar campaigns on Armenia's political situation.

== Biography ==
=== Early life and rise to power ===
Smbat was the son of Varaz-Tirots III Bagratuni. His father had been assassinated by the Byzantines, which gave Smbat a particular reason to hate them. According to Joseph Markwart, the murder of Varaz-Tirots was part of a Byzantine plot to weaken the resistance of the Armenian nakharar houses. After Nerses Kamsarakan's brief tenure, Smbat succeeded him. He had previously served as sparapet (commander-in-chief) under Kamsarakan, inheriting both political authority and military experience that helped him later counter Arab and Byzantine threats.

Smbat acceded to the post of presiding prince in 691. His early years coincided with the intensification of the Arab–Byzantine conflict. According to Cyril Toumanoff's genealogical studies, Smbat belonged to the branch of the Bagratunis that controlled the strategic regions of Sper and Tayk on Armenia's north-western borders. Smbat paid particular attention to the defence of the Armenian Church. As Hrach Bartikyan has shown, the Byzantines attempted to use ecclesiastical pressure as a tool to strengthen their influence in Armenia, but Smbat resisted this by all available means.

=== Defection to the Arabs and captivity ===
When the Umayyads, after the end of the civil war, returned in force to Armenia in 693 under Muhammad ibn Marwan, Smbat defected to their side and even had captured Byzantine soldiers mutilated and executed in vengeance for his father. As Karen Yuzbashyan notes, this act was not only revenge but also a political calculation aimed at strengthening the Arab alliance and weakening Byzantine pressure. According to Łewond, who dates the incident to 698, Smbat confronted the Byzantine army sent by Emperor Tiberius III "at the swamps of Paik" (the Paik marshes). The battle was bloody and indecisive; Smbat withdrew, but the exhausted Byzantines abandoned their invasion in turn. Thanks to his betrayal, Smbat was confirmed by the Umayyads as "prince of the Armenians". From 695, however, the earlier policy of tolerance and respect for Armenian autonomy was replaced by repression. Muhammad's troops plundered the country, systematically persecuted the Armenian nobles, and confiscated their possessions. When Muhammad left, he left an Arab governor (ostikan), Abdallah ibn Hatim al-Bahili, who continued this policy; even the Catholicos Sahak III Dzaraporentsi and Smbat himself were for a time sent as prisoners to Damascus. According to Aram Ter-Ghevondyan, this captivity was part of a pressure tactic aimed at breaking the resistance of the Armenian nobility.

=== Battle of Vardanakert (702) ===
After being released, sometime before 700, Smbat decided to defect to the Byzantines. He gathered his followers north of Mount Ararat, including the prince of Vaspurakan, also named Smbat, and Vard Rhstuni, whose father Theodore had played a central role in the submission of Armenia to the Arabs in the 650s. Smbat's forces, numbering some 2,000, began their march to Byzantine territory in winter. The 8,000-strong Umayyad garrison at Nakhchivan pursued them, but the Arabs, unaccustomed to harsh winter conditions, were defeated with heavy losses near Vardanakert; reportedly, only 300 survived the battle and the cold. Łewond describes the battle in detail, highlighting Smbat's military genius and the courage of the Armenian forces. Smbat pursued the Arabs to the walls of the fortress of Ernjak, whose ruler, the lady Shushan, moved by pity, offered the Arabs sanctuary and persuaded Smbat to call off his pursuit. As Movses Kaghankatvatsi notes, this episode shows the humanity of the Armenian princess even toward enemies, characteristic of the Armenian nobility.

Smbat sent a messenger to Constantinople with news of his victory. He was welcomed by the Byzantines, given the high title of kouropalates, and settled at Tukhark in the border region of Tayk. According to Bartikyan, the title of kouropalates was granted only to the most loyal and influential allies, indicating Smbat's political weight.

=== Nakhchivan massacre and battle of Drashpet ===
The opportunity to return to Armenia arose in 705, when the Umayyad authorities convened many Armenian nobles on the pretext of registration for military service, but instead burned them alive in churches at Nakhchivan and Khram. This atrocity, as Yuzbashyan writes, caused deep shock in Armenian society and was long remembered as a symbol of Arab cruelty. Movses Kaghankatvatsi notes that this event greatly affected political sentiment in Aghvank and the eastern provinces of Armenia. Leading a Byzantine force, Smbat invaded Armenia but was defeated at the Battle of Drashpet and forced to retreat, this time establishing himself at Poti on the Black Sea coast, probably indicating that the Arabs threatened his former base. Hovhannes Draskhanakerttsi notes that this defeat was temporary, and Smbat continued to struggle for Armenian independence.

=== Return to Armenia (711) and later life ===
In 711, at least partly in response to renewed ecclesiastical pressure on the Armenian Church in Byzantine-controlled lands, Smbat again switched sides: he plundered the local churches and the villa granted to him by the emperor, seized the town's treasury, and defected to the Arabs. The Byzantines excommunicated him, but the Arabs, who had again adopted a more accommodating policy, welcomed him with open arms and restored him as presiding prince of Armenia. According to Ter-Ghevondyan, Smbat's move was motivated not only by personal interests but also by a realistic assessment of the political situation: the Arabs at the time represented a greater military force than the weakening Byzantines.

Nothing further is recorded of his fate; the next known presiding prince was his relative Ashot III Bagratuni (732–748). According to Toumanoff's genealogical studies, Smbat's heirs continued to play an important role in Armenian political life, preparing the further rise of the Bagratunis.

== Historical assessment ==
Smbat VI Bagratuni has received a multifaceted evaluation in historiography:

- Joseph-François Laurent describes him as the "most typical example" of the tendency of Armenian princes to switch sides between Byzantium and the Caliphate whenever they quarreled with either of the two great powers of the region.
- Aram Ter-Ghevondyan emphasizes Smbat's role in preserving Armenia's independence between the Arab and Byzantine powers.
- Karen Yuzbashyan notes that Smbat's period of rule was a preparatory phase for the subsequent rise of the Bagratunis, and that his policy, despite its external inconsistency, actually followed a consistent logic: maximum protection of Armenian interests by maneuvering between the great powers.
- Hrach Bartikyan draws attention to the political significance of the kouropalates title received from Byzantium.
- Cyril Toumanoff in his genealogical studies clarifies Smbat's kinship ties and titles.
- Joseph Markwart in his historical-geographical studies addresses the borders of Smbat's domains.

== Family ==
Smbat VI Bagratuni had four sons:

- Ashot – presiding prince of Armenia (732–748)
- Vasak
- Bagrat
- Smbat – nakharar (perished in 705 during the Nakhchivan massacre)

== Legacy ==
Smbat VI Bagratuni is remembered as a skilful diplomat and military leader who managed to preserve the autonomy of Armenia during a critical period. His frequent changes of alliance, though sometimes seen as inconsistency, were actually a pragmatic response to the shifting balance of power between Byzantium and the Caliphate. His resistance to Byzantine ecclesiastical pressure helped preserve the doctrinal independence of the Armenian Church, while his military victories, especially at Vardanakert, boosted Armenian morale and demonstrated the effectiveness of Armenian forces against larger Arab armies. His line continued in the Bagratuni princely house and contributed to the eventual restoration of the Armenian kingdom under his successors.

== See also ==
- Bagratuni family tree
- List of Armenian princes
- Battle of Vardanakert
- Nakhchivan massacre

Preceded by Nerses Kamsarakan	Presiding Prince of Armenia; 691–726	Succeeded by Ashot III Bagratuni
