= Nerses Kamsarakan =

Armenian Prince

Nerseh or Nerses Kamsarakan (Armenian: Ներսեհ Կամսարական) was the presiding prince of Armenia in 689–691, backed by the Byzantine Empire.

Armenia had been under the suzerainty of the Arab caliphate since the mid-650s, with the exception of a brief period of Byzantine rule in 657–661, during the civil war of the First Fitna in the caliphate. Another civil war, the Second Fitna, broke out in 680, and allowed the Byzantine emperor, Justinian II, to try to reassert Byzantine authority in Armenia.

The Byzantines invaded Armenia under general Leontius, in 686/7 or 689. Instead of the incumbent presiding prince, Ashot II Bagratuni, they appointed Nerses, prince of Shirak, to rule the country on behalf of Byzantium, with the title of kouropalates. Nerses was also the first presiding prince referred to by the Armenian sources as 'prince of princes' (ishkhan ishkhanats).

Nerses' rival, Ashot II, was killed while confronting a retaliatory Arab invasion in 690, Kamsarakan's tenure was brief, lasting until 691. He was succeeded by Smbat VI Bagratuni who betrayed the Byzantines and defected to the Arabs in 693, when the Umayyads, victorious in their civil war, invaded Armenia once more.

== Sources ==
- Grousset, René (1973). Histoire de l'Arménie, des origines à 1071 (in French). Paris: Payot.
- Laurent, Joseph L. (1919). L'Arménie entre Byzance et l'Islam: depuis la conquête arabe jusqu'en 886 (in French). Paris: De Boccard.

Preceded by Ashot II Bagratuni	Presiding prince of Armenia under Byzantine suzerainty 689–691	Succeeded by Smbat VI Bagratuni
