= Mushegh VI Mamikonian =

Mushegh VI Mamikonian (Armenian: Մուշեղ Զ Մամիկոնյան; died 25 April 775) was an Armenian noble of the Mamikonian family. He served as presiding prince of Arab-ruled Armenia in 748–753, and later participated in the Armenian rebellion of 774–775 against the Abbasid Caliphate, being killed in the Battle of Bagrevand.

== Sources ==
- Dadoyan, Seta B. (2011). The Armenians in the Medieval Islamic World: The Arab Period in Arminiyah, Seventh to Eleventh Centuries. Transaction Publishers. ISBN 9781412846523.
- Grousset, René (1973). Histoire de l'Arménie des origines à 1071 (in French). Paris: Payot.
- Laurent, Joseph L. (1919). L'Arménie entre Byzance et l'Islam: depuis la conquête arabe jusqu'en 886 (in French). Paris: De Boccard.

Preceded by Grigor II Mamikonian	Presiding prince of Armenia under Umayyad and then Abbasid suzerainty 748–753	Succeeded by Sahak III Bagratuni
