= Sahak III Bagratuni =

Prince of Armenia from 754 to 761

Sahak III Bagratuni was an Armenian noble of the Bagratuni (Bagratid) family. He served as presiding prince of Armenia under Abbasid rule in 754–761. He was succeeded by Smbat VII Bagratuni.

== Sources ==
- Dadoyan, Seta B. (2011). The Armenians in the Medieval Islamic World: The Arab Period in Arminiyah, Seventh to Eleventh Centuries. Transaction Publishers. ISBN 9781412846523.
- Grousset, René (1973). Histoire de l’Arménie des origines à 1071 (in French). Paris: Payot.
- Laurent, Joseph L. (1919). L'Arménie entre Byzance et l'Islam: depuis la conquête arabe jusqu'en 886 (in French). Paris: De Boccard.

Preceded by Mushegh VI Mamikonian	Presiding prince of Armenia under Abbasid suzerainty 754–761	Succeeded by Smbat VII Bagratuni
