= Grigor I Mamikonian =

Presiding Prince of Armenia
- Tenure: 661 – 685
- Predecessor: Hamazasp IV Mamikonian
- Successor: Ashot II Bagratuni
- Noble family: Mamikonian
- Spouse: Helen (daughter of Varaz Grigor)
- Father: Davit Mamikonian

Grigor I Mamikonian (Armenian: Գրիգոր Ա Մամիկոնյան) was the presiding prince of Armenia in 662–685, when the country was under Arab domination.

Grigor had been taken prisoner by the Arab governor of Syria, Mu'awiya, along with other Armenian nobles in 654/55, and was kept hostage at Damascus. In 661, when Mu'awiya entered into a civil war against Ali for control of the caliphate, and was seeking supporters in the provinces of the Arab empire, Grigor was released upon the request of the Armenian princes (nakharar) and Patriarch Nerses III the Builder, and named as presiding prince of Armenia. He succeeded his brother Hamazasp IV Mamikonian, who had allied with the Byzantines when the latter had occupied Armenia in 657/58.

Grigor is described by the medieval sources as a "benevolent man, distinguished by his spiritual qualities, just, calm and gentle". Grigor's rule was initially peaceful and prosperous, as Mu'awiya's Umayyad Caliphate held the Byzantines at bay. He is well remembered for his church foundations, and for transferring the relics of Saint Gregory the Illuminator to Vagharshapat.

Grigor was killed fighting against a Khazar invasion in 685. In his stead, Ashot II Bagratuni was appointed as presiding prince.

== Sources ==
- Grousset, René (1973). Histoire de l'Arménie, des origines à 1071 (in French). Paris: Payot.
- Laurent, Joseph L. (1919). L'Arménie entre Byzance et l'Islam: depuis la conquête arabe jusqu'en 886 (in French). Paris: De Boccard.

Preceded by Hamazasp IV Mamikonian	Presiding prince of Armenia under Umayyad suzerainty 661–685	Succeeded by Ashot II Bagratuni
