= Battle of Vardanakert =

702 battle between Umayyad Caliphate and Bagratid Armenia

Coordinates: 40.2885°N 44.9795°E

Date	c. 702/703
Location	Vardanakert, North to the mountain Ararat, near the riverbanks of Araxes, Armenia
Result	Armenian victory

Belligerents
Umayyad Caliphate	Bagratuni family

Commanders and leaders
Ostikan of Arminiya	Smbat VI Bagratuni

Strength
5,000	2,000

The Battle of Vardanakert was fought between an Arab garrison and Armenians in January 703. The Armenian prince Smbat VI Bagratuni defeated the 5,000-strong Umayyad army from the garrison in Nakhichevan. Struck by a surprise attack, the remaining Arabs fled to the river Araxes and either drowned or froze to death. Smbat, chosen to rule by Byzantine commission, managed to re-conquer the majority of Armenia and drive the Arabs out of the country.

== Aftermath ==
Despite this success, the Umayyad generals Muhammad ibn Marwan and Maslamah ibn Abd al-Malik soon restored Armenia to subject status. (Note: Macler states it was the Arab commander Qasim that invaded and reconquered Armenia.) Muslim control was secured by organizing a large-scale massacre of the princely families (nakharar) within the cathedral of Nakhchivan, which was burned, in 704.

== Sources ==
- Hoyland, Robert G. (2015). In God's Path: The Arab Conquests and the Creation of an Islamic Empire. Oxford University Press.
- Macler, Frederic (1923). "Armenia". The Cambridge Medieval History. Vol. IV:The eastern Roman empire (717-1453). Cambridge at the University Press.
