= Grigor Ghapantsyan =

Armenian academic

Grigor Ghapantsyan (Kapantsian, Armenian: Գրիգոր Ղափանցյան, 1887– 3 May 1957) was an Armenian historian, orientalist, linguist and philologist, Doctor of Philological Sciences, Professor, Academician of the Academy of Sciences of Armenia, Honored Scientist of the Armenian SSR.

== Biography ==
Ghapantsyan was born on February 17, 1887, in Ashtarak. He received primary education in Ashtarak, then studied in Saint Petersburg. In 1913 he graduated from the Department of Armenian-Georgian Philology of the Faculty of Oriental Languages of St. Petersburg University, returned to Armenia and up to 1918 conducted various courses in the field of the Armenian Studies at the Gevorgian Seminary in Echmiadzin. In May 1918 he took an active part in the Battle of Sardarapat. In 1921 he was invited to Yerevan State University, where he headed the Department of General Linguistics for many years, teaching Old Armenian, historical-comparative grammar of Armenian, Urartian, general linguistics. He made significant contribution to the Urartology in Armenia, as well as to the investigation of the international cuneiform civilizations. John A. C. Greppin has described Ghapantsyan's work on the history of the relation of Urartu and ancient Armenia as "groundbreaking".

In 1943 he was elected a founding member of the newly established Academy of Sciences of the Armenian SSR and was elected Academic Secretary of the Department of Social Sciences. In 1950–1956 he was the Director of the Language Institute of the Academy of Sciences of the Armenian SSR. He died on May 3, 1957, in Yerevan. His bronze bust is placed in the lobby of YSU Main Building. A commemorative plaque is attached to the wall of the building No. 32 on Abovyan Street in Yerevan.

In 1949, during the deportations of Armenians by the Stalin's government, Ghapantsyan was among those repressed. Ghapantsyan and his wife Hripsime Ghapantsyan (Stepanyan, 1895–1983) had three children.

Grigor Ghapantsyan Museum was opened in 1987.
