= Sper =

Sper may refer to:

- Sper (Armenia), ancient Armenian region
- Sper (Georgia), ancient Georgian principality
- Sper (historical region), now part of the Eastern Anatolia region of Turkey
- South Pacific Electric Railway (SPER), which operates the Sydney Tramway Museum
- The real spectrum in real algebraic geometry

== See also ==
- Speer (disambiguation)
- Spear (disambiguation)
