= Hamazasp IV Mamikonian =

Hamazasp Mamikonian (Armenian: Գրիգոր Մամիկոնյան) was the presiding prince of Armenia in 655–661, when the country was under Arab domination. After the Byzantine invasion of 657/58, he switched sides and served the Byzantines.

Hamazasp Mamikonian became presiding prince of Armenia in 655 by the Rashidun Caliphate, when it occupied Armenia and evicted the Byzantine emperor Constans II. Hamazasp succeeded Theodore Rshtuni, who led the faction favourable to the Arabs, as well as the pro-Byzantine cavalry commander Mushegh IV Mamikonian. The contemporary Armenian historian Sebeos describes him as "an excellent man from every point of view, a good family man, a lover of reading and studying".

Despite owing his appointment to the Arabs, Hamazasp hailed from the western (and long-time under Byzantine control) regions of Armenia, and retained his links with the Byzantines. When the Byzantines returned to Armenia in 657, upon the outbreak of civil war in the Arab caliphate, he immediately switched sides to them. In reaction to his betrayal, the Arabs executed most of the Armenian nobles they held captive.

The Byzantines left Hamazasp in control of Armenia, and gave him the title of kouropalates. The Arabs returned in 661, and Hamazasp's fate is unknown. He was replaced by his brother, Grigor.

== Sources ==
- Grousset, René (1973). Histoire de l'Arménie, des origines à 1071 (in French). Paris: Payot.
- Laurent, Joseph L. (1919). L'Arménie entre Byzance et l'Islam: depuis la conquête arabe jusqu'en 886 (in French). Paris: De Boccard.

Preceded by Theodore Rshtuni	Presiding prince of Armenia under Rashidun and then Byzantine suzerainty 655–661	Succeeded by Grigor I Mamikonian
