= Ghevont =

Ghevont is an Armenian given name, also spelt Ghevond, Ghewond and Ghevont. It is the Armenian spelling of Leontius. Notable people with the name include:

- Ghevont Alishan (1820–1901), ordained Armenian Catholic priest, historian and a poet
- Ghevont Tourian (1879–1933), the primate of the Eastern Diocese of the Armenian Apostolic Church of America
- Łewond, also known as Ghevond, 8th-century Armenian priest and historian
