= Seta Dadoyan =

Armenian scholar

Seta Dadoyan (Armenian: Սեդա Տատոյեան) is an Armenian scholar who specializes in medieval Armenian political and intellectual history in their interactive aspects with the Near Eastern world. She was a professor of Cultural Studies, Philosophy and Art at the American University of Beirut (AUB) between 1986 and 2005. She has also taught at other universities including the Haigazian University (1981-1986), Columbia University (2002, 2006), St. Nerses Seminary (2007-2010), the University of Chicago (2010) She has written over fifty articles and ten books, and is believed to be the first Armenian woman to have received a Doctor of Sciences in Philosophy focusing on the history of Armenian philosophy. Her scholarly work focuses on medieval Armenian history with a special emphases on the relationship between the Armenians and Muslims; she is considered a leading scholar in this field. More recent profiles describe her as the author of twelve books and over sixty scholarly articles, and as the scholar credited with initiating the discipline of Islamic-Armenian interactive history.

Seta Dadoyan was born in Aleppo, Syria, to an Armenian family. She moved to Beirut, Lebanon, where she received her Master of Arts degree in Philosophy from the American University of Beirut in 1969. In 1986 Dadoyan became a professor at the American University of Beirut, and remained there until 2005. According to her own published biographical notes, she earned a B.A. from Beirut College for Women before her AUB master's degree, and later received her Doctor of Sciences in Philosophy through Yerevan State University.

== Later career and recognition ==
Her lectures have received acclaim by academics and scholars including Michael Morony, who said they will raise "the consciousness of people about the involvement of Armenians in the general history of the Middle East. James R. Russell called them an intellectual feast. In 1999, Dadoyan was awarded the David Anhaght medal, the highest medal granted by the Armenian Academy of Philosophy, for her contributions to Armenian philosophical studies. > In 2015, she has awarded the "St. Mesrop Mashtots" badge of honor by Aram I, the Catholicos of the Great House of Cilicia of the Armenian Apostolic Church in Antelias, Lebanon.

In November 2021, the Society for Armenian Studies presented Dadoyan with its Lifetime Achievement Award in recognition of her contribution to the field, describing her career in Armenian Studies as spanning more than 40 years. At the event, SAS president Bedross Der Matossian discussed her 2011–2013 trilogy The Armenians in the Medieval Islamic World and her 2021 book Islam in Armenian Literary Culture: Texts, Contexts, Dynamics (Louvain: Peeters), calling the latter an important contribution to Armenian, Islamic, and Interfaith studies. According to the same profile, she was also elected a fellow of the Royal Institute for Inter-Faith Studies in Amman, Jordan, in 1997. Previously, she also received the Uzunian Award for Author of Best Armenian Book in 1987.

Dadoyan has presented her research at a number of North American academic institutions. In March 2020, she lectured on “Islam and the Armenians. The Fāṭimid Armenians” at Columbia University, in an event co-sponsored by the Columbia Armenian Center, Columbia's Department of Middle Eastern, South Asian, and African Studies, and the National Association for Armenian Studies and Research (NAASR). In November 2016, she discussed her bilingual book The Armenian Condition in Hindsight and Foresight: A Discourse (2015) in talks at UCLA and at Abril Bookstore in Glendale, California, framed around the centenary of the Armenian Genocide. In November 2024, she returned to UCLA to lecture on the source material behind ''Islam in Armenian Literary Culture'', discussing what she termed the "Armenian Mahmet," "Armenian Pax Islamica," and "Armenian Ghurans".

A 2013 review of the first volume of her trilogy in the academic journal The Historian discussed her use of Arabic and Persian sources to enrich the understanding of Armenian medieval history. A 2015 review essay by independent scholar Robert Bedrosian in Armenian Review likewise discussed her scholarship on Armenian-Islamic interaction. A note on the trilogy published via Columbia University's Academic Commons in 2015 described her earlier work on the Fatimid Armenians as "a staple in medieval Armenian history" and characterized the trilogy as aimed at both Islamicists and Armenologists, navigating both Arabic and Armenian sources.

== Art ==
In addition to her scholarship, Dadoyan is also a painter. Her 2023 book ''Encounters and Convergences: A Book of Ideas and Art'' (Los Angeles: Global Print Inc., 175 pages) combines her philosophical and historiographic writing with her visual art; it is divided into a section on aesthetic theory, "My Aesthetic," and an illustrated, autobiographically structured section, "The Quest and the Path," containing 89 reproductions of her artwork. In a four-part series written for ''The Armenian Weekly'' in 2024 describing the making of the book, Dadoyan said her artistic output falls into two main phases, 1975–1991 and 2021–2022, and that wartime Lebanon was a formative influence on her drawing and painting, alongside her later "American-Armenian experience."

The book was the occasion for a 2024 lecture series in New York, "Counterpoints: Philosophy, Historiography, Art," held at the Atamian-Hovsepian Curatorial Practice, a gallery and cultural center on East 24th Street co-founded by writer and curator Christopher Atamian. The lectures were also described as a prologue to a planned exhibition of her artworks at the same venue. In November 2025, AGBU listed the third talk in the series, "The Artwork and the Dialectics of Truth Content," addressing her aesthetic philosophy and its relation to her paintings.

== Selected works ==
=== Books ===
- Prolegomenon to the Millennial History of the Western Armenian World - The First Phase Tenth to Fifteenth Centuries - From Kingdoms to an Awakening Politics and Culture (2026).ISBN 978-1-967180-02-8
- Yovhan III Ōdznets‘i Saint, Jurist and Great Master of Armenian Mesopolitan Culture and Diplomacy (bilingual) (2025).ISBN 978-1-967180-00-4
- Nersēs IV Shnorhali - Saint and Diplomat and the Persistence of the People and the Church in the Western Armenian World (bilingual) (2025).ISBN 978-1-967180-03-5
- Encounters and Convergences. A Book of Ideas and Art (2023).ISBN 979-889121965-6
- Islam in Armenian Literary Culture: Texts, Contexts, Dynamics 2021.ISBN 978-90-429-4503-6
- The Armenian Condition in Hindsight and Foresight- A Discourse (bilingual) (2015).ISBN 978-1-4951-7994-5
- The Catholicosate of Cilicia - History, Mission, Treasures (2015).ISBN 978-9953-0-3164-4
- The Fāṭimid Armenians - Cultural and Political Interaction in the Near East (1997).ISBN 90-04-10816-5

=== Selected articles ===
- "The Armenian Ghurans 1680-2014", Le Muséon, 1-2, 133(2020), pp. 166-205.
- "Samuēl Anets‘i and his Continuators", in Christian-Muslim Relations – A Bibliographical History –The Ottoman and Persian Empires, vol. 12, (eds) D. Thomas and J. Chesworth. Leiden: Brill, 2018, pp. 319-339.
- "A Phenomenology of Armenian Studies: The Discipline and the ‘National’ Meta-Polis", Le Muséon, 1-2, 121(2008), pp. 213-229.
- "The Constitution of the Brotherhood of Erzinjān (1280): An Armenization of the Futuwwa Reform Project and Literature of ‘Abbāsid Caliph al-Nāṣir lī-dīn Allāh", Revue des Études Arméniennes, NS. 29(2003-2004), pp. 117-165.
- "The Armenian Intermezzo in Bilād al-Shām ‒ 10th to 12th Centuries", in Syrian Christians under Islam: The First Thousand Years. Leiden: E.J. Brill, 2001, pp. 159-183.
- "The Phenomenon of the Fāṭimid Armenians", Medieval Encounters, 2.3(1996). Leiden: E.J. Brill, pp. 193-213.
- "The Fāṭimid Armenians", Christian-Muslim Relations - A Bibliographical History (900-1050), vol. 2. (eds) D. Thomas and A. Malle. Leiden: Brill, 2011, pp. 25-27.
- "Bahrām al-Armani", Encyclopedia of Islam, III(2011). Leiden: Brill, 2011, pp. 63-64.
- "Badr al-Jamālī", Encyclopedia of Islam, III(2010). Leiden: Brill, pp. 133-134.
- "Yānis", Encyclopedia of Islam, Second Edition, XI(2007). Leiden: E. J. Brill. pp. 281–282.
