= Theodore Rshtuni =

Armenian nakharar (magnate) famous for resisting the first Arab invasions of Armenia

Sparapet Theodore Rshtuni Թէոդորոս Ռշտունի
- Born: AD 590
- Died: 655/656 Damascus
- Buried: Rshtunik'
- Rank: Sparapet (appointed before 640); marzban (634-)
- Conflicts: Arab conquest of Armenia; Byzantine–Arab Wars

Theodore or Theodoros Rshtuni (Old Armenian: Թէոդորոս Ռշտունի, romanized: T῾ēodoros Ṙštuni, Armenian pronunciation: [tʰɛodoɾos ərəʃtuni]; AD 590–655 or 656), equated with Pasagnathes (Πασαγνάθης), the "patrikios of the Armenians" from the chronicle of Theophanes the Confessor, was an Armenian nakharar (magnate), famous for resisting the first Arab invasions of Armenia. After the previous ishkhan (prince) David Saharuni was overthrown by other nakharars in 638 or 640, Theodore Rshtuni became the leading prince of Byzantine Armenia under the same title as his predecessor, "Prince of Armenia" (ishkhan hayots’).

== Arab invasions ==
The chronology of the Arab Muslim invasion of Armenia is not clear, Arab and Armenian sources making contradictory statements, with some clarity possible only in regard to the start of the aggression in the 640s, and Theodore Rshtuni's submission in 653.

Prior to the Arab invasions, Rshtuni had been appointed the sparapet (commander-in-chief) of the Armenian forces in the Armenian Marzpanate and was appointed as the marzban of Armenia in 634.

He defended, alongside the Byzantine general Procopius, against the first, unsuccessful Arab attack into Armenia in 640. A maneuver that went wrong allowed the Arabs to pillage the capital of Dvin and take 35,000 inhabitants into slavery. However, in 641, Byzantine Emperor Constans II followed the advice of Armenian Catholicos Nerses III, made Theodore commander in chief of the Armenian troops and gave him the title of a patrikios. He gained a victory over the Arabs, for which he was recognized as ruler of Armenia by Constans in 643, but failed to coordinate with a second army under Procopius, who suffered a severe defeat for which the Byzantines put the blame on Theodore.

It was the Arabs of Atropatene (geographically in the same area as modern-day Azerbaijan), who attacked in 642-3 and 650. Constans paid special attention to his family's imperiled homeland of Armenia, and he favored Byzantine generals of Armenian extraction to halt Arab advances. Faced with the impending loss of the province, he marched in, spent the winter of 652–3 at Dvin, and returned to Constantinople the next year after leaving an army in place. The three-year peace with the Arabs broke down in 653, followed by the final Arab conquest of 654.

Constans attempted to impose Chalcedonian doctrines, such as Monotheletism, on the Armenians, which offended both their clergy and ruling elites. When the Muslims managed to defeat the remaining Byzantine troops in 653, Theodore Rshtuni participated in pushing out the Byzantines and he again recognized Muslim overlordship on very convenient conditions. Theodore's truce with then-governor of Syria and future caliph, Muawiyah, left Armenia with a relatively high level of autonomy, and Arabs concentrated their efforts against the remaining pockets of resistance in the Sassanid Empire.

Another chronology proposes 651 as the year Rshtuni accepted the first truce with the Arabs, and that by 652 he accepted Muawiyah's suzerainty and was appointed ruler of Armenia.

The Soviet Armenian Encyclopedia of 1978 states that in response to Theodore Rshtuni's treason, Constans personally marshaled his forces and led them to Armenia despite a growing plot against him in Constantinople by the Armenian commander of the army of Thrace. Constans secured Armenia and deposed Theodoros, who took refuge on the island of Akhtamar. Byzantine commander Maurianus was given the task to defend the Armenian frontier. In 654 Maurianus was driven out of Armenia into the Caucasus and Theodoros was restored. Deciding that Theodoros was untrustworthy, the Arabs sent him to Damascus, where he died in captivity the following year. Alternative years are 655 for the Muslim campaign during which Theodore Rshtuni was taken to Syria, and 656 for his death. He was replaced as prince by his son-in-law, Hamazasp IV Mamikonian. His body was brought to his home district of Rshtunik, where he was buried in the tomb of his forefathers.

== Legacy ==
According to Manuk Abeghian and a number of other scholars, the popularity of Rshtuni in Armenia manifested itself in the character of Keri Toros in the epic poem of David of Sasun. The Armenian writer Tserents also wrote a historical novel called Theodoros Rshtuni.
