= Bagratuni dynasty =

Royal dynasty of Armenia

Bagratuni Բագրատունի
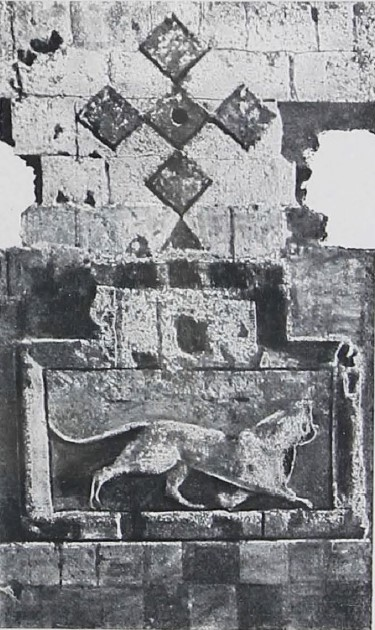
- Bas-relief of a leopard with a cross above it from the ruins of Ani, believed to be a symbol of the Bagratuni dynasty or of Ani.
- Country: Armenia
- Founded: c. 300 AD
- Founder: Smbat I
- Final ruler: Gagik II (as King of Armenia)
- Titles: King of Kings of Armenia and Iberia (Armenian: Շահնշահ Հայոց և Վրաց); King of Armenia; King of Artsakh; King of Vaspurakan; King of Syunik; King of Lori; Prince of Vanand; Prince of Taron; Prince of Khachen; Prince of Tayk
- Cadet branches: Bagrationis; Rubenids; Hasan-Jalalyan (indirectly); Kiurikians

The Bagratuni or Bagratid dynasty (Armenian: Բագրատունի, Armenian pronunciation: [bagɾatuni]) was an Armenian royal dynasty which ruled the medieval Kingdom of Armenia from c. 885 until 1045. Originating as vassals of the Kingdom of Armenia of antiquity, they rose to become the most prominent Armenian noble family during the period of Arab rule in Armenia, eventually establishing their own independent kingdom. Their domain included regions of Armenia such as Shirak, Bagrevand, Kogovit, Syunik, Lori, Vaspurakan, Vanand and Taron. Many historians, such as Cyril Toumanoff, Nicholas Adontz and Ronald Suny, consider them to be the progenitors of the Georgian royal Bagrationi dynasty.

== Origin ==
The genealogical roots of Bagratuni go back at least to the families bearing the surnames Bagadata, Baga, Bagarna or Bagawanda, which existed during the time of the Aratta state and the kingdom of Van, as well as to the tribal and epithet name Baghbatu, Bagbashtu or Bagmashtu, derived from the Indo-European-Aryan root. Modern Armenian historiography is largely unanimous in its opinion regarding the Armenian origin of Bagratuni. Supporters of this point of view include, for example, the researcher Rafael Matevosyan, who, through a detailed scientific study, irrefutably refuted the point of view about Jewish origin.

In particular, one of the most famous modern Armenian historians, Albert Musheghyan, writes in his book "The Age of Movses Khorenatsi":

"The Bagratunias, descendants of the dynasty of the Armenian kingdom, did not fully recognize their alleged descent from the Jew Shambat. ' History of Armenia", as a book ordered by Prince Sahak Bagratuni and being the property of the Bagratuni dynasty, remained under protection (forbidden) for a long time, and it was allowed to be used only by individual historians, and only on the condition that they would not mention the foreign origin of Bagratuni".

In addition, the same historian makes a very important remark:

"As far as I know, the first author to mention this is the historian of the eighth century, Movses Kagankatvatsi, who quotes almost verbatim the following passage from Khorenatsi: "And if you want to know the history of Bagratuni, then Paruyr, the son of Skyord, called Hrachya, the son of Ayka, the king of Armenia, asked the king of Babylon for a certain Jew from among the captives, Shambat, the name which he gave to the Armenians and settled in this land with great honor. In his opinion, the people of Bagratuni were reduced to the smallest of the great peoples of the empire".

=== Bagratuni's theory of Jewish origin ===
A misunderstanding arises from the "History of Armenia" by Movses Khorenatsi, according to which the Bagratuni descend from the Jew Shambat, from whose descendants the Armenian king Vagharshak granted Shambat Bagrat the post of crowned knight, appointed him the ruler of the western part of Armenia and named the dynasty Bagratuni in his honor. However, in this case, the scribe's manuscript cannot be trusted. First, the oldest extant manuscript of his History dates from the ninth century, almost half a millennium after the historian's death, and we are not sure that it has not been edited. Khorenatsi first mentions the origin of the Bagratuns, speaking of the Armenian king Hrachya, the son of Patriarch Paruyr and a contemporary of the Assyrian king Nebuchadnezzar II (605–562 BC).

"He is called Rook because of his light face and fiery eyes. It is said that Nebuchadnezzar, the king of Babylon, who captured the Jews, died of hunger. And it is said that one of the leaders of the Jewish captives, wanted by Nebuchadnezzar, named Shambat, was brought and settled in our land with great honor. And from this the historian says that the Bagratun people exist, and he is sure of it".

The historian repeatedly testifies to the "Jewish origin" of Bagratuni, and to make this more convincing, he attributes Jewish origin to the names adopted in the princely dynasty, especially highlighting the name Shambat, which, in his opinion, was equivalent to the name Smbat, often found among the Bagratuni. Khorenatsi next mentions the Bagratuni under the name of "Shambat of Bagarat", who, according to Khorenatsi, King Vagharshak (in fact, Trdat I Arshakuni), in addition to granting Arshakuni the right to be the hereditary hereditary prince, also appointed "a partisan, prince of the Boers and thousands" in the western part of Armenia. In addition to these offices, by order of Trdat I (66-88), the tribe descended from Bagarat was to be called "Bagratuni" in his honor. Bagrat also had the right to the title of knight, since when making the rounds of the court and the royal house, he had to wear a three-layered headdress made of small pearls without gold or (precious. Khorenatsi, or rather the more likely editor or editors of his History of Armenia, denies that the Bagratids descended from their ancestor Hayk.

"Because some unscrupulous people say, on their whim, and not according to the truth, that the Bagratids were the ruling race in Armenia. That's why I say: don't like such nonsense. For there is not a single way or indication of the similarity of what you have said that hints at beauty." "For this speech and my casual words will make the young people of Armenia and the like stumble".

Khorenatsi's testimony to this view, despite his denial of Bagratuni's Armenian origin, speaks to its importance and widespread circulation at the time. The information provided by Khorenatsi about the origin of Bagratuni is limited to this, although it was enough for this topic to become the subject of study for several Armenologists. However, even if Khorenatsi reported the Jewish origin of Bagratuni, this cannot be accepted unconditionally. In the V century in the Armenian world, when the kingdom of Arshakuni was already in decline, there was a struggle for supremacy between the ruling houses of Bagratuni, Syunik and Artsrun. Naturally, this struggle did not have a purely economic or military-political context. Each of the clans also had to put forward hypotheses justifying their superiority. The Syuniks were descended from Patriarch Hayk, the Artsrun attributed their descent to the kings of Assyria, and the Bagratuni could choose the Jewish version and attribute their descent to King David of Judah, thereby becoming relatives of Jesus, especially given that Christianity was the dominant ideology at that time. This was a widespread practice in the ancient world. This is a very indicative hypothesis, especially considering that Khorenatsi wrote the "History of Armenia" on behalf of Prince Sahak Bagratuni. By the way, Kertogahairi in his speech to Prince Sahak mentions:

"Because some unscrupulous people say, of their own free will, and not according to the truth, that the Bagratuni were the ruling race in Armenia. Therefore, I say: do not like such stupidity. For there is no way, no indication of similarity in your words, which can hint at beauty. For in an eloquent and unfashionable way, my young man will stumble over Bagratuni and the like".

True, the historian rejects the Armenian origin of Bagratuni, but he also confirms the prevalence of this theory in the 5th century. And an anonymous historian of the ninth century believes that the Bagratuni descended from Aramaniak, the son of Hayk's ancestor.

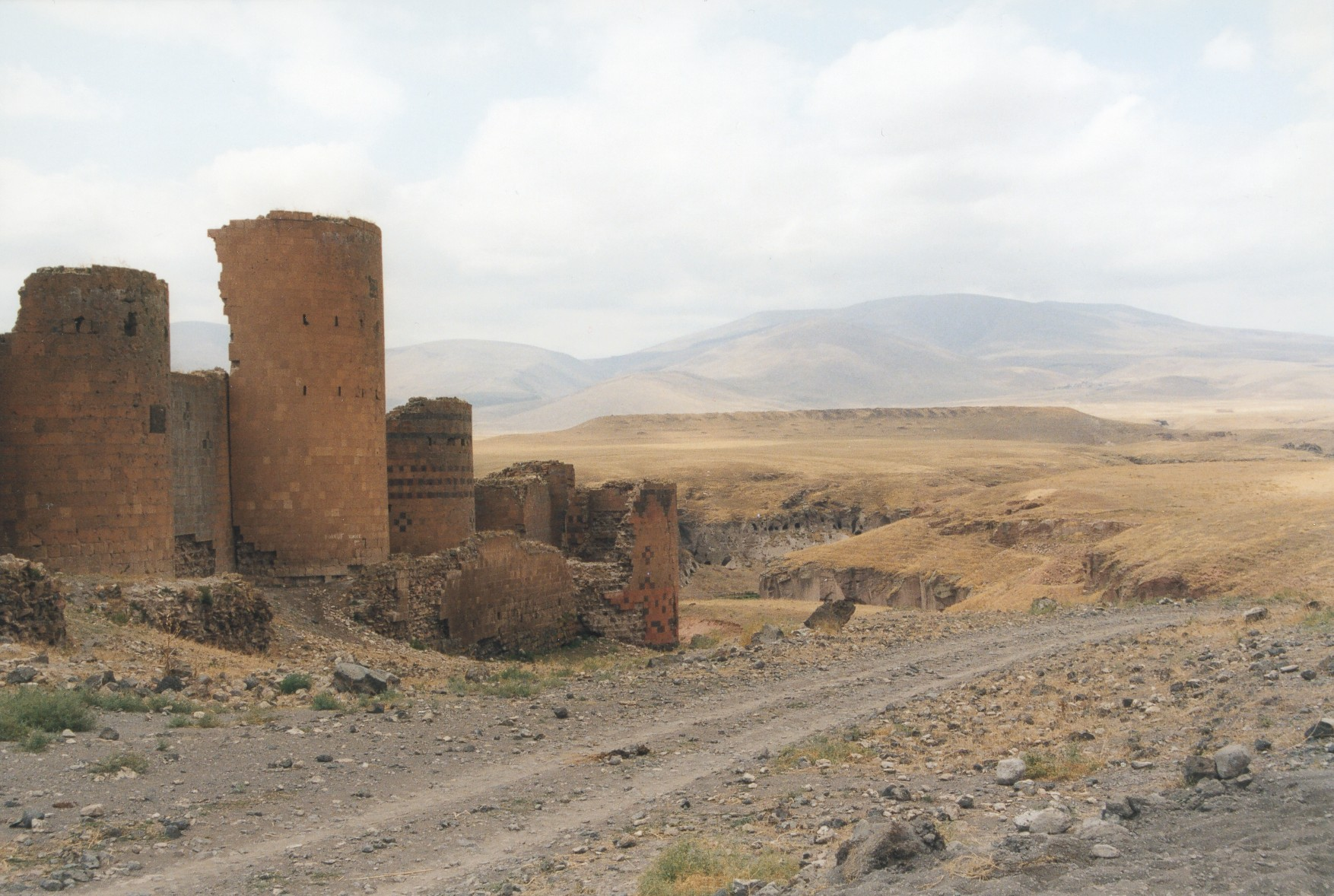
The walls of Ani.

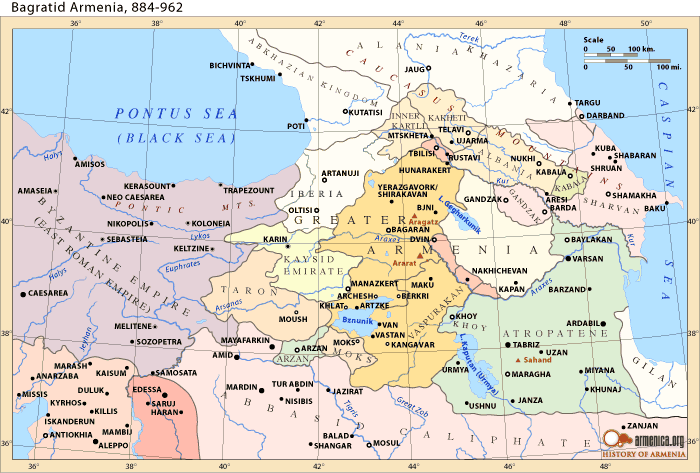
1.Yellow: A. Central Armenian Kingdom of Bagratuni, B. Kingdom of Armenian Bagratuni in Iberia, C. Kingdom of Artsruni in Vaspurakan, Southern Armenia, 2.Red: Subordinate Emirates in D. Dvin, E. Nakhichevan, F. Tiflis, 3.other colours: subordinate principalities of G. Syunik, H. Artsakh, I. Parisos, J. Taron, K. Kartli, L. Kakheti, M. Caucasian Albania Albania, N. Kabala, O. Kaysite Emirate, P. Gandzak, etc..

== The Armenian Origin of Bagratuni According to Sebeos, or "The Story of Anonymous" ==
The next evidence of the ancient origin of one of the most powerful Armenian ministerial dynasties is contained in Anonymous, according to which Bagratuni descended from the descendants of Patriarch Hayk.

"And over them (the Armenians) ruled Zarekh, the son of the sons of Aramanak, a strong man and an archer. Then Armog, then Sarhang. Then Shavash, then Parnavaz. He begat Bahama and Bagarat. And Bagarat begat Byurat and Byurat begat Aspath. And the sons of Bagarat inherited their inheritance from the west, that is, the house of Angeg. Because he was called Bagrat and Angegh, as the barbarian peoples of that time called him.

In addition, Anonymous mentions Bagarat Parazyan, a descendant of the Aramaniak dynasty.

"Sma (Arshak the Younger) came to Bagarat Parazyan, Aramen's minister, in large clothes. He offered him a sacrifice of gold and silver. And he sat him on a throne covered with gold. And he gave his daughter in marriage to him".

== References of foreign historians about Bagratuni ==
Information about the origins of the Bagratunis, or the first Bagratunis, is not limited to references cited by Armenian historians. In addition, foreign historians also attest to the Bagratunis. In particular, the Greek historian Appian mentions Bagat as a military commander of King Tigranes the Great. Bagat received from Tigranes the Great the position of governor of most of modern-day Syria, that is, Seleucid Syria. This phenomenon proves that even during the reign of Tigranes the Great, in the first half of the 1st century BC, the Bagratunis were extremely reliable and occupied a very important position in the Armenian state.

=== Josef Markvart ===
Josef Markwart (1864–1930), a German orientalist, Armenian scholar, philologist and linguist, is one of those historians who consider the Armenian prince Baghadat-Bagrati, a general under King Tigran the Great and ruler of Syria, to be the ancestor of the Bagratids. Marquart wrote about this in his important historical-geographical study: "Iran on the Map of the World by Moses Khorenatsi", published in German in Berlin in 1901. Markvart was a great friend of the Armenian people. He regularly spoke out in defense of the Armenian cause and fought against malicious distortions of Armenian history. He condemned the anti-Armenian policy of the Abdulhamid dynasty (On the Coman Tribe, German, 1914), exposed and presented to the world community the policy pursued by Germany during the First World War. To emphasize his respect and goodwill for the Armenian people, the guardians of the ancient culture, Marquardt translated his name and surname into Armenian and sometimes signed himself "Hovsep Bdeshkhyan".

=== Nikoghayos Adonts ===
Nikoghayos Adonts, also known as Nikoghayos Gevorg Ter-Avetikyan (1871–1942), an Armenian historian, Byzantine scholar, and philologist, also believed that Baghadat-Bagrat, the commander of King Tigran the Great, was an ancestor of Bagratuni. By the way, Professor Adonts made a great contribution not only to the genealogy of Bagratuni, but also to the history of the princely dynasty. He connects the emergence of the Bagratuni dynasty with the Armenian-Iranian ethnic fusion, referring to the name of the dynasty and the title of "knight" assigned to them. Adonts connects Khorenatsi's mention of the Bagratunis, originating from the south and having Jewish origin, with the fact that Bagarat ruled for a long time a region inhabited by Semitic peoples (Cilicia and Assyria - M.G.). Adontz also examines the reports of Anonymous or Sebeos in detail, attributing them to the influence of the Holy Scriptures, since the historian mentions as many Armenian kings (Zarekh, Armog, Sarhang, Shavarsh, Parnavaz) as there were among the Jews in the same period (Hezekiah, Manasseh, Amun, Hosea, Jehoiakim). He considers it impossible that Bagarat Parazyan, being a contemporary of Nebuchadnezzar II (7th century BCE), lived at the time of the arrival of King Arshakuni in Mtsbin, which occurred around the middle of the 2nd century AD. Adonts also considers it unlikely that the sons of Bagarat, descendants of Zarekh and Parnavaz, bear the name Bagarat instead of the above-mentioned names. According to Adonets, Zarekh, mentioned by Anonymous, may remind us of Zariadris, the founder of the kingdom of Tsop, whose Parthian version of the name is Zarekh. On the other hand, Zarekh could bear the shadow of the Iranian hero Zariadr, who was the brother of Vshtaspi and ruled Marastan and the lowlands, and under the rule of his brother, the aforementioned Zariadr, were the Caucasian countries from the Caspian Sea to the Tanais (Don) River. However, he considers it more probable and shares with Marquart the point of view according to which Zare was known to Anonymous from the village of Zare near Bhagavan. Adonts interprets the names Bahamas and Shavarsh or Shavash in the same way, associating the former with Bhagavan and the latter with Shavarshan. Without paying much attention to the name Sarhang (Old Persian: hero, modern Persian: colonel), he refers to the names Armog and Parnavaz. Armog is identified with the Georgian Artog, who was the king of Georgia and a contemporary of Tigran the Great (95–55 BC), and Parnavaz is identified with Tigran the Great's son Artavaz (55–34 BC). According to Adonets, there must have been another Parnavaz before this Parnavaz. But he believes that Anonymous is familiar with this name from Pavstos Buzand. According to the latter, Parnavaz is perceived as a Georgian royal house. The reason that Anonymous presented Parnavaz as Bagrat's father may have been that Anonymous often turns geographical proximity into tribal proximity, referring to the province of Sper, which belonged to the Bagratids and through which, according to Adonets, Armenian and bordered.

=== Leo ===
Leo, also known as Arakel Babakhanyan (1860–1932), a prominent Armenian historian, writer, literary critic, publicist, full member of the Institute of Sciences and Arts of Armenia, professor, also agreed with the above-mentioned point of view of Nikoghayos Adonets. That is, according to Leo, the ancestor of Bagratuni is the ruler of Cilicia and Assyria of the first century BC, Bagadat-Bagrat, the commander of Tigran the Great. Moreover, Leo attributes Bagratuni exclusively to Armenian origin. In addition, Leo considers the Kogovit region of the Ayrarat region of Greater Armenia to be the original place of residence of Bagratuni. Referring to the fact that Khorenatsi or the editors of his "History" ascribe Jewish origin to Bagratuni, Professor Leo explains this as follows: there was a long-standing rivalry between the Mamikonians and Bagratuni. Thus, Khorenatsi, being a supporter of the Bagratuni dynasty, attributed to them a Jewish origin, and thus the father of history tried to attribute to Bagratuni a more ancient origin.

=== Grigor Khalatyants ===
Grigor Khalatyants (1858–1912) was an outstanding Armenologist, historian, philologist, educator and cultural figure. Doctor of Historical Sciences (1903), Professor (1906). He is known for his extreme and absurd accusations against the Armenian historians of the fifth century. This prominent Armenologist, researcher and philologist Grigor Khalatyants also expressed his opinion on a possible political trick by Khorenatsi aimed at artificially attributing Jewish origin to Bagratuni and presenting them as an older dynasty. Moreover, this researcher was apparently inclined to believe that this tendency originated with Ananuni and only later passed on to Khorenatsi. According to Grigor Khalatyantsev, Anonymous was completely influenced by the Bible, since another form of the name Bagarat, Pakarat, is found in the Bible as "sons of Pakarat", in the Book of Nehemiah as Pakarat (the name of the latter was mentioned in the list of the sons of Israel who returned from the Babylonian captivity of Nebuchadnezzar), as well as in the 2nd Book of Ezra as Pakerot or Pakeroth. In addition, Greg Khalatyantsev saw similarities, perhaps even identity, between Bagarat Parazyan of Anonym and Shambat Bagarat, who met Khorenatsi, held the titles of crown prince and knight, and greeted the king. The only difference, according to Khalatyantsev, is that Khorenatsi considers Bagarat to be a descendant of the Jewish Shambat, while Anonymous attributes Armenian origin to the Bagratunists.

=== Aslan Shahnazaryan ===
The above-mentioned point of view of Grigor Khalatyanets was subsequently criticized by some Armenologists, in particular, Aslan Shahnazaryan (1877-1955), Candidate of Historical Sciences, Associate Professor, born in Artsakh. The latter conditioned this point of view of Grigor Khalatyanets by the fact that he belonged to the number of extremist-minded philologists who tried to prove that Khorenatsi lived at the end of the 8th or the beginning of the 9th century, therefore, probably, he used anonymous authors. Meanwhile, Shahnazaryan, proving the greatness of Khorenatsi, completely refuted this point of view.

Aslan Shahnazaryan considers Baghadat-Bagrat, the commander of Tigran the Great, to be the ancestor of the Bagratuni dynasty. Shahnazaryan, referring to Urartian scholars, according to which the word "uni" in the Urartian language means "genealogy" and retained its meaning in the Armenian language as a suffix to proper names, connected the explanation of the name of the princely house with the composition of the surname of the princely dynasty, which consists of the words "Bagarat" and "uni", therefore, Bagratuni, according to A. Shahnazaryan, would mean the genealogy of Bagrat. However, this fact did not at all oblige Bagratuni to have an Urartian origin, as some experts.

=== Anton Garagashyan ===
A multi-talented historian, philologist, clergyman, linguist, and philosopher, Father Anton Garagashian (1818-1903) was one of the first to analyze the names Bagratunis (Bagarat - God-giving, Smbat - silver (sim), and pat (shen), the conquering boar, equivalent to the Sassanid name Peroz, and the compound forms - Varaztirots, Varazvazan, Varazdat, etc.) and deny their Jewish affiliation, ascribing an Aryan origin. The historian and linguist notes a contradiction in Khorenatsi's references regarding the Jewish origin of the Bagratunis. This refers to the disagreement between Enanos Bagratun and Zora, the patriarch of Gntun. According to these testimonies, Enanos, having rebelled against the king, tried to find an ally through Zora, but the latter, however, objected to the Enanos Bagratunis, denying their Palestinian (Jewish) status. Anton Garagashyan briefly mentions a viewpoint, which would later become firmly established and believed to be true, according to which Khorenatsi was referring not to the nationality, but to the religious affiliation of the Bagratunis when he said "Jew." Garagashyan also offers a remarkable perspective on the reality of the coronation of the Armenian king, a position reserved for the Bagratunis, calling it not only an old and accepted custom among Armenians but also a religious ceremony. The historical origins of this phenomenon date back to the period when power in the land was theocratic, meaning secular authority was in the hands of a priest or prophet. When this was delimited, the latter continued to perform the coronation or anointing ceremony of the king. Perhaps this is why Garagashyan compares them to the Vakhunis. This assumption is also based on the first word, "bag," in the name "Bagratuni," which means "God" in many Indo-European languages. Garagashyan explains the tribe's name, "Vakhuni," in the same way, claiming that the word "vau" is another form of the word "beetle" and has the same meaning.

=== Mar ===
Nikoghayos Mar (1865-1934) expressed his opinion on the origin of Bagratunis. The latter, first of all, studied the most common names among the Bagratuns. As a result of the study, the names Ashot, Smbat, Gagik were recognized as more akin to the Habet world and weaker to the Iranian one. As for the ambivalent opinion about Bagratuni's origins, Mar links it to the changing preferences of Armenian society. According to which, the bearers of the old traditions associated the Bagratuns with the local tribes, others, the bearers of new Christian views, gave preference to their descent from the biblical David. This point of view and the "Jewish" origin attributed to Bagratuni were reflected especially in Georgia, where a branch of the authoritative Bagratunis reached the royal rank. According to Georgian sources, this branch of the Bagratuni family was related to the Prophet David, which meant kinship with the Virgin Mary. Considering such an exaggeration as to the origin of the Georgian branch of the Bagratuns impossible, Joseph Marquardt, Kirill Tumanov, Nikoghayos Adonts, and other scholars considered the Georgian Bagratuns to be descendants of the Armenian Bagratunis. In this case, Ashot's son Vasak was the ancestor of the Georgians Bagratunis.Homily 732-750. We are talking about Vasak, the son of the Armenian prince Ashot Kuir, who participated in 774-775. The source of this point of view, expressed by experts, is the relevant reference of Vardan Areveltsi.

=== Grigor Kapantsian ===
The famous Armenian historian Grigor Kapantsyan (1887-1957) has a rather peculiar point of view regarding the origin of Bagratuni. In particular, Kapantsyan attributes the origin of the Bagratuns to the Urartian period, attributing to this ministerial dynasty the Manai origin. In this case, according to Kapantsyan, Bagratuni's ancestor could be Bagadat, the king of the country of Man. Moreover, in the theory of Grigor Kapantsyan, we find information not only about Baghdad, but also about Iranzu and Baghdad's predecessor Aza II, the king of the country of Mana, who, according to Kapantsyan, is the father of Baghdad, and Iranzu is the father of Aza, therefore, the grandfather of Baghdad. If we consider Bahadat Bagratuni, then automatically we should accept not him, Bagadata, but his grandfather, i.e. Iranza, as the founder of the dynasty. Therefore, in the Urartian period, the first Bagratuni known to us is Iranzu instead of Baghdad, the second is Aza B, the son of the latter, and the third is Baghdad. Initially, Grigor Kapantsyan proposed to consider Manu or the Merdzurmian country, the king of which was Baghdadi, as a possible settlement of the Bagratuns. On the other hand, Nicholas Adonts, whose point of view is summarized above, took approximately the same place, or rather, Bagrevand, lying northwest of Mana or the country of Merdzurmyan, as the ancestral home of Bagratuni.

=== Rafael I. Matevosyan ===
Historian Rafael Matevosyan (1932-2002), who died in 2002, as well as Grigor Gapantsyan, was of the opinion that Bagratuni originated from the much older Urartian and Manai periods. As evidence, being a historian and heraldist, R.I. Matevosyan points to the following facts: A. The coat of arms of Bagratuni bears the imprint of the influence of Urartian heraldry, B. The name of the goddess Bagbartu, the wife of the main Urartian god Khalde, comes from the same root BAG, as the surname Bagratuni.

Moreover, Matevosyan considers it likely that the surname of the ministerial family of Bagratuni must have come from the name of the goddess Bagbartu. Moreover, R. Matevosyan, in addition to the assumption of the probable existence of the Bagratuns in the Urartian period, also considered the question of the origin of the princely dynasty of the Bagratuns, presenting the views known to Armenologists in chronological order. As a result of this historian's research, the Jewish origin of the Bagratuns was completely refuted, and the possibility that Shambat was the ancestor of the Bagratuns was also recognized as unlikely, since instead of "Bagratuns" they would be called "Shambatuns". Matevosyan also proves the Armenian origin of the Bagratuns with contradictions found in the memoirs of Khorenatsi.

=== Kirill Tumanov ===
Prince Kirill Tumanov (born 1913 in St. Petersburg, Russian Empire – died 1997 in Rome, Italy), American historian, researcher, genealogist and Caucasian scholar, opened a new page in the study of Bagratuni's genealogy. Tumanov is considered one of the most authoritative experts on the history of the princely dynasties of Armenia and Georgia. Kirill Tumanov was the first to talk about a possible relationship between Bagratuni and Yervanduni. In addition to the above-mentioned fact, Tumanov also backs up his point of view with geographical and toponymic data. We are talking about the cities of Bagaran and Yervandavan, built by King Yervand IV of Greater Armenia (220-201 BC) near the last capital of the Yervanduns, Yervandashat, as well as the center of Bhagavan in the province of Bagrevand to the south of them, bordering the province of Tsaghkotn in the southeast, where the village of Angkh was located. Kirill Tumanov, in addition to considering Torka Angha (the deity of the Yervanduns) to be mentioned in the word "baga", semantically considered Bagaran and Bhagavan as equivalents of "Angh" and "Angkh duon", which were considered sacred places of the Yervanduns. Tumanov adds to the above facts that the princes of Yervanduni, like the Bagratunis, bore the name "Bagarat", meaning the prince of the Bagrevand region (Bagarat region) Bagrat Yervanduni, from whose name the hereditary estate of the latter received its name - Bagrevand.

== Early history ==
The name Bagratuni comes from the Parthian form of the ancient Iranian name Bagadata ("God-bearer"). Historian Kirill Tumanov suggests that a general of King Tigran II of Armenia named Bagdat was the earliest representative of the Bagratuni dynasty which first appeared as members of the hereditary nobility of Armenia in the early 4th century. The Arshakuni dynasty, which ruled Armenia from 52 to 428, granted the family hereditary rights. The first prince of Bagratuni, recognized by Tumanov, Smbat I, lived at the time of the adoption of Christianity by the Armenians. From Smbat onwards, the Bagratids bore hereditary titles: aspet, meaning "head of cavalry" or commander of cavalry (although this appears to have been purely ceremonial rather than a real military command), and taagakir, indicating that they had the privilege of crowning the kings of Arshakuni at their accession to the throne. Their holdings included the Speri region in the valley of the Chorokhi River in Upper Armenia, known for its gold and silver, and Tayk. After the Arab invasions of the 7th century, members of the Bagratid house often bore the title of "prince" of Armenia, although they were subordinate to the Muslim ruler appointed by the caliphs, the polis.

== Proclamation of the Kingdom ==
In 876, an event took place that significantly strengthened the authority of Prince Ashot Bagratuni. The Armenian Emperor Basil (Barsegh) I, who ascended the Byzantine throne, sent a eunuch named Nikitus to Ashot Bagratuni with a request for the crown.

The successes of Ashot Bagratuni awakened the idea of restoring the Armenian kingdom among the Armenian ministers. Stepannos Orbelian reports:

"At that time, having considered the divine council of that time, under the leadership of Grigory Supansky and Vasaki, called the prince, the rulers of Syunik, together with Grigory Derenik, who was the prince of the house of Artsrun, and other Armenian princes, asked the ruler Amir-Ahmadu to make Ashot Bagratuni the king of Armenia" .

On August 26, 885, in the city of Bagaran, Catholicos Gevorg Garnetsi proclaimed Ashot Bagratuni, who had been the prince of Armenia for 29 years, king of Armenia, using the royal crown and insignia received from Samara Ashot Bagratuni had effectively exercised royal power since the assassination of al-Mutawakil, and this also gained legal recognition after the chaos that began in Samara, as already mentioned, the Christian rulers of Armenia came together and recognized him as King of Armenia at a meeting convened in Shirakavan in August 862.

== The Fall of the Kingdom ==
In 1042, Constantine Monomakh ascended the Byzantine throne. He decided to take possession of Ani at any cost in order to accomplish what Emperor Michael could not do. He appealed to Gagik II and, as the heir to the "will" of Hovhannes-Smbat, demanded "his inheritance". King Gagik was well aware that it was not always possible to resist the powerful Byzantium by force of arms, so he tried to resort to diplomacy. Gagik maintained peace with the Byzantines and an alliance, considered himself a servant of the emperor, but did not want to cede power to him. Finally, seeing that the Byzantines were dissatisfied with this, that their goal was the abolition of the Armenian kingdom and its annexation to the Byzantine Empire, Gagik decided to resist. In 1044, Constantine Monomakh decided to put an end to the Bagratid kingdom and, providing Mikhail Yasit with a large army, ordered the capture of Ani. But even this second campaign of the Byzantine troops ended in a shameful defeat. In the same year, 1044, the enraged emperor sent against Gagik the eunuch Nicholas, his chamberlain, the commander of the Byzantine troops. Nikolai is defeated. On the advice of the vestal virgin Sargis, Constantine Monomakh invited Gagik II to Constantinople, ostensibly for negotiations. He remained unshaken for a month, but in the end, finding no way out, agreed to hand over the empire to Ani, in exchange for which Monomakh, forbidding Gagik to return to Ani, gave him the cities of Kalon Pelat and Pisa in Cappadocia as an estate, ordering the king's family to be moved to Byzantium. Gagik received extensive possessions in Asia Minor, as well as a palace in Constantinople In turn, in the difficult conditions that had developed, the traitors, who had gathered in Ani itself, managed to isolate the uncompromising supporter of the struggle and defender of independence Vahram Sparapet, deprive him of the support of his supporters and, having established contact with the enemy, at the beginning of 1045 surrendered Ani, and consequently the entire kingdom, to the Byzantine Empire. The kingdom of Ani, which had pan-Armenian significance, was destroyed. This had tragic consequences for the Armenian people: in Armenia itself, the statehood that had existed for many centuries was destroyed.

== State system ==
In the early period of statehood, the Armenian kingdom was a single state, the "Armenian House" consisted of three "dominions".

From the middle of the 10th century, one of the characteristic features of the internal political life of Armenia was the further economic and military strengthening of large and medium-sized feudal houses, the growth of their political independence. In addition to Vaspurakan, new kingdoms arose in different parts of the country (in Syunik). This period of Bagratid Armenia, covering the second half of the 10th century and the first half of the 11th century, is considered a period of fragmentation in Soviet Armenian historiography. During this period, the forms of relations and cooperation of large feudal houses changed, and shifts in the structure of the state were inevitable: the "Armenian House" was transformed in accordance with the new conditions.

== Famous cities of the Armenian state of Bagratids ==
=== Dvin ===
Dvin, the ancient capital of Armenia, was one of the main cities of Armenia from an administrative and economic point of view during the Arab rule and at the same time the residence of the Armenian police. When, perhaps due to the uprisings of 747-750 and 774-775, the Armenian police chose Partav as their residence, it did not lose its importance and continued to be one of the .

=== Yerazgavors ===
It was an ancient settlement, the origin of the name of which is sometimes associated with the name of Yervaz from the Yervanduni dynasty. Later, it was also called Shirakawan.

=== Bagaran ===
Bagaran was the capital of the Armenian Bagratid dynasty during the reign of Ashot I. Previously, it was one of the religious centers of the kingdom of Yervanduni.

=== Kars ===
Originally known as a fortress, it was the center of Vanand's power. These were the possessions of Ashot I's brother, Abbas. From Abbas to the founding of the kingdom of the same name, Kars was the residence of Armenian generals. After the restoration of the Dvin-Trapezius road, the city gradually grew and soon turned into an important trading center of the Bagratudin kingdom. For some time (928-961) it was the capital of the Bagratudin dynasty.

=== Ani ===
It is mentioned as a fortress as early as the V century, and as a city it began to form, perhaps, at the end of the 9th century and especially in the X century. Together with the province of Shirak, it was acquired by Ashot Msaker and became part of the Bagratud kingdom. During the reign of Smbat I, it is often referred to as the fortress around which the formation of the city began.

#	Images	Name	Years of reign	Additional information
1		Ashot I	885-890	Ashot strengthened the country's unity, intervened in disputes between the princely houses, and established family ties between the Bagratuni, Artsruni, and Syunik princely houses. He succeeded his brother Abbas as general, and another son, Smbat, became king of Armenia and continued his father's work. He married two of his three daughters to Artsruni. Sophia married Grigor-Derenik and became queen consort of Vaspurakan, and another daughter married Vahan Artsruni. The youngest daughter, Mariam, married Vasak Gabur and became queen consort of Syunik. Friendly and Dashnak ties were established not only with influential Armenian princes, but also with Georgians and Albanians. The latter were the Georgian and Albanian Bagratunis.As early as the mid-870s, the Artsruns and other princes, together with the Catholicos of Armenia, demanded that the Arab Caliph recognize Ashot's kingdom. To appease the Armenians and expel them from Byzantium, the Caliphate complied with their demand. Caliph Mutamid sent Ashot a crown in 885. Ashot also accepted the crown sent by Emperor Basil I, receiving international recognition.On August 26, 885, Catholicos Gevorg Garnetsi proclaimed Ashot Bagratuni, who had been Prince of Armenia for 29 years, King of Armenia, using the royal crown and insignia received from Samarra. Ashot Bagratuni had actually exercised royal power since the assassination of al-Mutawakkil, and this also received legal recognition after, amidst the chaos that had broken out in Samarra, as already mentioned, the Christian rulers of Armenia came together and recognized him as the King of Armenia at an assembly convened in Shirakavan in August 862. However, in the following years, the far-sighted and cautious Prince Bagratuni, while being the actual and legal bearer of royal power, nevertheless in no way succumbed to false motives and, in particular, personal ambitions and in no way emphasized this status of his, especially in international relations.
2	Սմբատ	Smbat I	890-914	He inherited the Armenian throne in 890, but only fully established himself on it in 892. After the death of Ashot I, the Armenian throne passed to Smbat by right of seniority. However, Ashot I's brother, sparapet Abas, also laid claim to the throne. This led to a struggle for the throne, which led to internecine wars. Ultimately, Smbat managed to defeat his uncle and finally established himself on the Armenian throne in 892. That same year, Smbat's authority was also recognized by the Arab Caliphate. In 892, Smbat captured Dvin, the last Arab stronghold in Armenia. He annexed the regions of Tayk, Taron, Aldznik, High Armenia, and the district of Javakhk in the province of Gugark to his kingdom. According to the historian Hovhannes Draskhanakerttsi, during the time of Smbat, the borders of Armenia in the east reached Atropatene, in the west – the Euphrates, in the north – Georgia, and in the south – the Taurus Mountains. Chronologically, the historians Agathangelos and Pavstos Buzand, who lived before Movses Khorenatsi and Anonymos (or Sebeos, who included the relevant part of this history in his work), provide no information about the origins of the Bagratid family. In Agathangelos's "History" and Pavstos Buzand's "History of Armenia," the Bagratids are mentioned only as nakharars, bearing the titles of "tagadir" ("crown-bearer") and "aspet."
3		Ashot II	914-928	The reign of Ashot Bagratuni was not an easy one. Ashot Erkat entered political life as the Prince of Armenian Princes. During the reigns of the first four Bagratuni kings (Ashot I, Smbat I, Ashot II, Abbas: 887-953), the position of Prince of Armenian Princes was held by members of the royal house who subsequently inherited the Armenian throne. During the reign of Smbat I, the king's two brothers, Shapuh and then David, were appointed princes of the Armenian princes. At that time, Smbat I was unable to appoint his son Ashot as prince of the Armenian princes, as in 897 he was forced to hand over Afshin, the emir of Atropaten, as a hostage and took him back in 901. In 903, after Afshin's death, Emir Yusuf of Atrapatakan waged war against Smbat I, but they soon made peace. Yusuf sent a royal decree to Smbat I appointing his eldest son, Ashot, as Prince of the Armenians, recognizing his right to the throne.Ashot Yerkat, recognized by Emir Yusuf, held the post of prince of the Armenians until 909, when Yusuf invaded Armenia.
4		Abas I	928-953	After Ashot the Iron, Abas Bagratuni ascended the throne and reigned for quite a long time, from 929 to 953. During his reign, the capital of the Bagratuni kingdom was the impregnable fortress of Kars, which became one of the most prominent cities in Armenia. Unfortunately, the information that has reached us about this, arguably significant, period of Abas Bagratuni's reign is scant and fragmentary. However, one thing is clear: the international situation favored the country's peaceful development..
5		Ashot III	953-977	King Abas (929-953) was succeeded by his son, Ashot III the Merciful (953-978), who wielded considerable power both in Armenia and in neighboring countries. Ashot was the eldest of King Abbas's sons. He had two brothers, Atrnerse and Mushegh. The latter later ruled in Kars. During the reign of Ashot III, Armenia experienced an economic and cultural upsurge, and the country enjoyed relative peace. During his reign, old cities expanded and new ones were built. His wife, Queen Khosrovanush, founded the monasteries of Sanahin in 966 and Haghpat in 976, which quickly became centers of scholarship and education. Ashot III opened schools, hospitals, and orphanages in the country's main cities and allocated a portion of his income for their upkeep, an exceptional practice for the time. Ashot III was a "philanthropist," for which he was called "the Merciful."
6		Smbat II	977-990	Smbat was the eldest son of Ashot III the Merciful. According to modern historian Stepanos Taronetsi Asoghik, immediately after the death of Ashot III, his son Smbat ascended the throne and reigned for thirteen years. According to the Armenian movable calendar, Ashot III's death is dated January 3, 978, so Smbat's reign began at the very beginning of 978. Historiography has occasionally expressed the view that Smbat was his father's co-regent since 958. This opinion was primarily based on the phrase "the residence of the Armenian King Smbat," mentioned in Anania Mokatsi's work. However, this does not refer to Smbat, the son of Ashot III, but to the former residence of Smbat I in Shirakavan, near Yerazgavors. The position of modern and later historians, according to which Smbat reigned on the day of his father's death, also does not support the hypothesis of co-reign.
7		Gagik I	990-1020	After the death of King Smbat II, he was succeeded by Gagik I, who ruled from 990 to 1020. He actively fought against centrifugal forces and strengthened the kingdom of Ani. Clearly, he could not ignore Munich's separatist aspirations. Speaking of Gagik, Asoghik writes specifically: "And he took possession of the fortress and provinces on the borders of Vayots Dzor, Khachen, and Parisos, more than his brother."
8		Hovhannes- Smbat	1020-1041	Gagik I was the last powerful king of the Armenian Empire. After his death, separatist tendencies emerged even in the Kingdom of Ani. The struggle for royal power between Gagik I's sons escalated into an armed conflict, which drew the intervention of neighboring states. Eventually, thanks to the intervention of the Armenian commander Vahram Pahlavuni and the Georgian king, the brothers reconciled. The eldest son, Hovhannes-Smbat, supported by the court elite, inherited the throne, receiving the city of Ani, Shirak, and neighboring provinces. His younger brother, Ashot IV, received the southern and eastern regions of the Kingdom of Ani. After the death of Hovhannes-Smbat, Ashot was destined to inherit his possessions. The Kingdom of Ani effectively disintegrated, and its subordinate kingdoms became virtually independent. The Bagratid Empire ceased to exist. Hovhannes-Smbat ruled from 1020 to 1041. To save the country from destruction, he sent a delegation led by Catholicos Peter I to Trebizond for negotiations with the emperor. The Armenian king instructed the Catholicos to draw up a will after his death, bequeathing the country to the emperor as his inheritance. In 1021, in Trebizond, the Byzantine Emperor Basil II imposed his will on the Armenian and Georgian nobility by force of arms. Under the difficult circumstances created by the orders of Hovhannes Smbat, Armenian Catholicos Peter I Getadardz traveled to Trebizond. Here, a fateful "testamentary agreement" in Armenian history was signed, according to which Hovhannes Smbat transferred the Kingdom of Ani to the Byzantine Empire after his death.
9		Gagik II	1042-1045	In Armenology, the activities of Gagik II Bagratuni were discussed by Mikael Chamchyan, Leon, Manuk Abeghyan, Ghevond Alishan, Hrachya Acharyan, Maghakia Ormanyan, and others. Among Armenian chroniclers, he was mentioned by Aristakes Lastivertsi, Grigor Magistros, Samvel Anetsi, Vardan Areveltsi, Mkhitar Ayrivanetsi, Matthew Urkhaetsi, Kirakos Gandzaketsi, Smbat Sparapet, and others, while among Byzantine historians, he was mentioned by Hovhannes Skylitzes and Michael Attaleiates. Gagik II was born around 1024. The 12th-century chronicler Matthew Urkhaetsi describes Gagik II as a wise and God-fearing youth.Manuk Abeghyan notes that there was a library at the court of Ani; the same was true at the Catholicosate. Gagik II is also known as a scholar and activist. Historiography contains conflicting accounts of his marriage. According to Matthew Urkhaetsi, his family was moved from Ani to Byzantium; according to Aristakes Lastivertsi, he married the daughter of Senekerim's son, David, at the emperor's request; and according to M. Ormanian, he married David's widow to inherit his estate.

== See also ==
- Bagratuni family tree
- List of Armenian monarchs
- Pakradouni

== Literature ==
1. Ռաֆիկ Մաթևոսյան. Բագրատունիներ, պատմա-տոհմաբանական հանրագիտարան, Երևան, 1997
2. Ալբերտ Վ. Մուշեղյան. Մովսես Խորենացու դարը, Երևան, ԵՊՀ հրատ., 2007։
3. Մովսէս Խորենացի. Պատմութիւն Հայոց, Քննական բնագիրը և Ներածութիւնը Մ. Աբեղյանի եւ Ս. Յարութիւնեանի, լրացումները` Ա. Սարգսյանի, Երևան, 1991։
4. Մարիամ Գրիգորյան, Բագրատունիների ծագման հարցի շուրջ։ Պատմաբանասիրական հանդես։ ՀՀ Գիտությունների ազգային ակադեմիա։ Երևան,, 2010 թվական, թիվ 2 (116)։
5. Անանունի պատմության այս հատվածը կցված է Սեբեոս պատմիչի Պատմությանը, Պատմութիւն Սեբէոսի, աշխատասիրությամբ Գևորգ Վ. Աբգարյանի, Երևան, 1979։
6. Ագաթանգեղայ Պատմութիւն, Թիֆլիս, 1888։
7. Փավստոս Բուզանդ. Պատմություն Հայոց, Երևան, 1968։
8. Տե՛ս Հակոբ Մանանդյան. Երկեր, հ. Ա, Երևան, 1977։
9. Յոզեֆ Մարքվարթ, Էրանշահր նախ դեր Գեոգրաֆիը դեզ Մոզեզ Խորենացի։ Բեռլին, 1901թ․, էջ. 174։ Գերմաներեն՝ J. M a r q u a r t. Eransahr nach der Geographie des Moses Xorenaci. Berlin, 1901։
10. Նիկողայոս Ադոնց. Հայաստանը Հուստինիանոսի դարաշրջանում, Երևան, 1987:
11. Նիկողայոս Ադոնց. Երկեր, հ. Ա, Երևան, 2006:
12. Լեո. Երկեր, հ. Բ, Երևան, 1967:
13. Գրիգոր Խալաթյանց, Հայոց դյուցազնավեպը Մովսես Խորենացու Հայոց Պատմությունում։․ մասն Ա, Մոսկով, 1896 թ։
14. Ա. Շահնազարյան. Բագրատունյաց նախարարական տոհմի ծագումը, Առանձնատիպ Պետական պատմական թանգարանի «Աշխատություններ», հ. 1-ից, Երևան, 1948:
15. Ասլան Շահնազարյան. Բագրատունյաց նախարարական տոհմի ծագումը, Առանձնատիպ Պետական պատմական թանգարանի «Աշխատություններ», հ. 1-ից, Երևան, 1948։
16. Անտոն Գարագաշյան. Քննական պատմություն հայոց, մաս Ա, Թիֆլիս, 1895։
17. Նիկողայոս Մառ, ԱՆԻ։ Երևան, 1939։
18. Սմբատ Դավիթիս ձէ։ Բագրատունիների պատմությունն ու տոհմական ասքը։ Թարգմանությունը, ներածությունը և ծանոթագրությունները՝ Մ․ Լորդկիպանիձեի։ Թբիլիսի, 1979թ։
19. Յոզեֆ Մարկուարտ. Վրական Բագրատունեաց ծագումը, գերմաներէնէ թարգ. Մ. Հապոզեանի, Վիեննա, 1913։
20. C. T o u m a n o f f. Studies in Christian Caucasian History, Georgetown, 1963, p. 203։
21. Մեծին Վարդանայ Բարձրբերդեցւոյ Պատմութիւն տիեզերական, Մոսկվա, 1861։
22. Գրիգոր Ղափանցյան. Ուրարտուի պատմությունը, հ. 1, Երևան, 1940։
23. Ռաֆիկ Մաթևոսյան. Բագրատունիներ, պատմա-տոհմաբանական հանրագիտարան, Երևան, 1997։
24. Արման Եղիազարյան, Հայ Բագրատունիների տերությունը (885-908 թթ․), Երևան, 2011։
25. Ստեփանոս Օրբելյան, Պատմութիւն նահանգին Սիսական, հ. Ա, Փարիզ, Կ. Շահնազարեանց, 1859։
26. Եղիազարյան Ա., Աշոտ Ա Բագրատունի. թագավոր Հայոց (թագադրության թվականը և գահակալության տարիները), ԵՊՀ հրատարակչություն, Երևան, 2014:
27. Տեր-Ղևոնդյան Ա., Արմենիան և Արաբական խալիֆայությունը, Երևան, 1977:
28. Дэвид Ленг, Армяне народ - созидатель, Москва , 2007.
29. Մելքոնյան Ա. (1998). Հայոց պատմություն. Դասախոսությունների ձեռնարկ. Եր.: «Հայագիտակ» հրատ.։
30. Ռ. Մաթևոսյան, Բագրատունյաց Հայաստանի պետական կառուցվաղքն ու վարչական կարգը, Երևան, 1990։
31. Ս. Երեմյան, Հայաստանը ըստ «Աշխարհացոյց»-ի, Երևան, ՀՍՍՀ ԳԱ հրատ., 1963։
32. Ագաթանգեղայ Պատմութիւն, Թիֆլիս, 1888։
33. Փավստոս Բուզանդ. Պատմություն Հայոց, Երևան, 1968։
34. Ա. Եղիազարյան, Հայոց իշխանաց իշխանը Բագրատունի առաջին արքաների օրոք, «Վէմ», 2014, № 1:
35. Եղիազարյան, Արման (2016). Աշոտ Երկաթ. Թագավոր Հայոց. Երևան: ԵՊՀ հրատարակչություն։
36. Հայ ժողովրդի պատմություն, հ. 3, Երևան, 1976:
37. Ստեփանոս Տարաւնեցի Ասողիկ, «Պատմութիւն տիեզերական», «Մատենագիրք Հայոց», ԺԵ հատոր, գիրք Բ, Երևան, ԵՊՀ հրատարակչություն, 2011։
38. «Տեառն Անանիայի Հայոց կաթողիկոսի յաղագս ապստամբութեանն տանն Աղուանից», «Արարատ», 1897, Գ։
39. Վարդան վարդապետ, «Հաւաքումն պատմութեան», Վենետիկ, Սուրբ Ղազար, 1862։
40. Արիստակես Լաստիվերտցի, Պատմութիւն, Երևան, 1963:
41. Մատթէոս Ուռհայեցի, Ժամանակագրութիւն, Վաղարշապատ, 1898:
42. Եղիազարյան Վ. (2020). Գագիկ Բ Բագրատունին և «Հավատոյ գիրը». Եր.։
