= Armenian Revolt (850–855) =

Armenian uprising against the Abbasid authority in 850–855

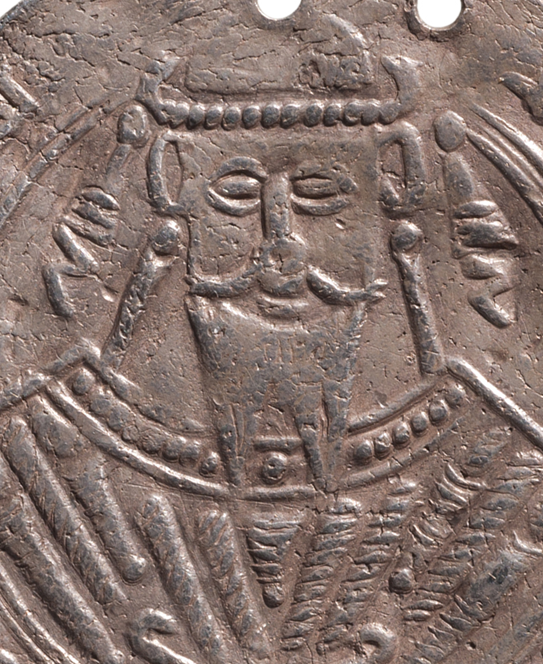
- Caliph al-Mutawakkil (depicted here on a dirham)
Date	850–855 CE
Location	Ostikanate of Arminiya and surroundings
Result	Abbasid victory
Territorial changes	Return of Abbasid authority over Arminiya; Destruction of Tbilisi; Arab tribal expansion in Arminiya

Belligerents
Abbasid Caliphate	Anti–Abbasid Rebels: Artsruni dynasty; Bagratuni dynasty; Siunia dynasty; Mamikonean dynasty; Gnuni dynasty; Emirate of Tbilisi (853); Kingdom of Abkhazia (854); Supported by: Byzantine forces Khazar forces Slavic forces

Commanders and leaders
Yusuf al-Marwazi †; Bugha al-Kabir; Muhammad al-Shaybani	Bagrat II (POW); Smbat VIII (executed); Musa ibn Zurara (POW); Ishaq ibn Isma'il †; Gurgen Artsruni (POW); Ashot I Artsruni (POW); Esayi Abumushe (POW); Sahl Smbatean (POW); Demetrius II

Strength
200,000	Unknown

Casualties and losses
1,800+ killed	30,000+ killed
- 50,000 residents massacred in Tbilisi

The Armenian Revolt (Arabic: ثَوْرَةُ الأَرْمَن) was an armed rebellion fought in 850–855 by Armenian nobility against Abbasid authority over Arminiya following a taxation dispute. The main leading families were the Bagratuni of Taron and Artsruni of Vaspurakan. It was ultimately crushed by the Turkic general Bugha al-Kabir in the service of caliph al-Mutawakkil (r. 847–861), helped by disagreements and rivalry among the Armenian nobility. Bugha went on to also defeat the Tbilisi emir and the Abkhaz king. Tens of thousands were executed and Tbilisi was destroyed. The numerous noblemen captured and held at the Abbasid capital during the rebellion were subsequently released.

== Background ==
Provided that the Bagratuni and Artsruni helped the Abbasids with their enemies and paid tribute, they were left undisturbed in their affairs in Armenia. Throughout the reign of Caliph al-Wathiq (842–847), Armenia (known as Arminiya) remained outside effective Abbasid control, but this changed in 847 with the accession of the energetic al-Mutawakkil who was determined to reimpose Abbasid authority. In 849, Caliph al-Mutawakkil appointed Abu Sa'id al-Marwazi as new governor of Arminiya. As Abu Sa'id moved with a large army to enter Armenia he was met on the border by envoys of Armenian vassal prince Bagrat II bearing precious gifts and advising him to not move further into the province. Armenian resistance to Abbasid tax policies intensified when Ashot Artsruni and Bagrat Bagratuni refused to pay tribute to Abu Sa'id in 849, only complying under threat of military action. This taxation dispute escalated into conflict in 850, as Bagrat wanted to have a separate emirate and independence from the caliphate. The revolt united multiple Armenian noble houses around the prince of Vaspurakan, including sixteen Artsruni princes, representatives of the Bagratuni, Amatuni, Gnuni, Yntruni, Apahouni, Vahevouni, Siuni, Mamikonian, and other Armenian families.

== Rebellion ==
In the next year (850), Abu Sa'id instead sent two local Arab lords, emir al-Ali as-Sawafi and emir Musa ibn Zurara of Arzen (who was married to Bagrat's sister), to subdue the two southern Armenian provinces of Taron and Vaspurakan on the pretext of raising taxes. According to Abbasid historian and contemporary Al-Baladhuri (820–897), one of the immediate causes of the revolt was vengeance for the desecration of the Dayr al-Aqdah monastery in Sisakan by as-Sawafi, which caused outrage among the Armenian princes and prompted them to begin correspondence with each other, encouraging rebellion and disobedience.

When as-Sawafi entered Vaspurakan, ishkhan Ashot I Artsruni of Vaspurakan defeated and pushed him out of the territory, and then went to assist Bagrat. The Armenian coalition included forces from multiple noble houses: detachments from 16 Artsruni princes, one detachment under Tornik Bagratuni, nine detachments under Shapuh Amatuni, seven detachments under Grigor Gnuni, eight detachments under Artavazd Yntruni, and another 14 detachments of other minor houses. The Armenian armies faced and defeated emir Musa near the capital of Taron, Mush, and pursued him until Baghesh, stopping only after pleas from Musa's wife, the sister of Bagrat. The Armenians then proceeded to massacre the Arab settlers in Aghdznik, prompting the Caliph to intervene in force.

Abu Sa'id launched a new expedition in 851 but died on 29 April 851 (22nd of Shawwal 236 AH), having ruled from 850 to 851. His son, Yusuf, whom was dispatched by Caliph Al-Mutawakkil, assumed command of the expedition and ruled from 851 to 852. The arrival of the Abbasid army in his lands led Ashot Artsruni to prefer to submit to the Arabs, forcing Bagrat too to enter negotiations with Yusuf. During the talks, however, with the connivance of his own brother, Bagrat and his brother were captured and brought to the Abbasid capital of Samarra. Bagrat's downfall came from his political ambitions – he was seeking the official position of supreme ruler (amil) of all Arminiya, Kartli, and Caucasian Albania, a position that had been held de jure by the princes of neighboring Albania since 837.

In retaliation for the capture of Bagrat and Ashot, residents of the Khut district under the leadership of a certain Yovhan retaliated by besieging Mush in early winter 851 with the first snow. After a nearly 3-month siege (in late February 852) managed to storm the city and killed Yusuf who had taken refuge under the dome of the Church of the Holy Savior. The severe winter conditions led to many soldiers losing fingers to frostbite.

Caliph Al-Mutawakkil responded by dispatching the Turkic general Bugha al-Kabir into Arminiya at the end of Ramadan (in 237 AH, the period between 27 March and 22 June 852). This powerful army under Bugha was made up of mostly Turkic slave-soldiers. Bugha also recruited over 200,000 Arab soldiers from all across the Abbasid Caliphate. Bugha first captured Musa ibn Zurara, whom he accused of treason for contributing to Yusuf al-Marwazi's death and sympathizing with the Armenian cause. Setting out from his base at Diyar Bakr, he first focused on the southern half of Armenia, i.e. the regions of Vaspurakan and Lake Van, before moving north to Dvin, Iberia and Albania. Bugha sent a detachment under commander Zirak to Rshtunik district, which devastated the area around Van. During a siege at Nkan fortress, Ashot Artsruni was forced to surrender due to disagreements among the Armenian princes.

When Gurgen Artsruni continued resistance, Bugha sent a 15,000-man force against him. In the subsequent battle at Zav River valley, Gurgen's 900 men defeated the Arab force, killing 1,800 Arab soldiers before the survivors retreated toward Azerbaijan. Bugha then sent a 10,000-man force under commander Khetum with promises of recognizing Gurgen's hereditary rule over Vaspurakan, but when Gurgen came to negotiate, he was captured and sent to Samarra. After securing Vaspurakan, Bugha went north to Kartli specifically to punish the powerful separatist Tbilisi emir Ishaq ibn Isma'il (833–853).

The Emirate of Tbilisi had up until now suppressed the ambitions of the Georgian princes and contended Abbasid authority in the region; Ishaq ibn Isma'il had resisted the Abbasids for over twenty years through withholding annual tributes. Bugha first managed to conquer Dvin successfully, Then he sacked and burned Tiflis (Tbilisi) by using a catapult to the ground, killing 50,000 residents (Muslim sources speak of them "burning alive"), and had Ishaq decapitated, ending the city's chances of becoming the center of an independent Islamic state in the Caucasus.

After conquering Tbilisi, Bugha defeated the Abkhazian king Demetrius II (818–854), who fled northward toward Alania. Bugha pursued him with a 120,000-man army, but his advance was halted by fierce resistance from the mountain fighters of Kakheti (the Tsanars, allied to Ishaq ibn Isma'il), whom he unsuccessfully attacked 19 times, amid severe winter conditions with heavy snowfall.

In Albania, Bugha besieged the fortress of Ktish where Esayi Abumushe had taken refuge. Despite 28 unsuccessful assault attempts over an entire year, the fortress held out until the Caliph sent written guarantees of safe passage, luring Abumushe to Samarra. The reimposition of Abbasid authority was marked by systematic massacres of Armenian military forces. Bugha's campaigns resulted in massive casualties, with 30,000 mountain fighters killed in the Sanasunk and Khut districts.

In response to Bugha's devastating campaigns, displaced survivors formed an international coalition seeking external support. The fleeing survivors contacted the Byzantines, the Khazars, and Slavic rulers, assembling a "great" opposing force. This international dimension compelled Bugha to request additional reinforcements from Baghdad, with Caliph al-Mutawakkil dispatching Muhammad ibn Khalid al-Shaybani to command supplementary forces. The arrival of these reinforcements ultimately forced the coalition to surrender by abandoning their resistance and seek amnesty.

In Dvin in 853/854, 150 Armenians were executed for refusing to convert to Islam. The campaign represented a systematic effort by the Caliph to target and decimate Armenian military nobility, essentially destroying its leadership structure to prevent future resistance. By the end of 853, Bugha had completely subdued the country and made many Caucasian magnates and princes (the eristavi and nakharar) captives, including Grigor-Derenik Artsruni, his uncle Gurgen and his father Ashot I, along with Vasak Siuni, Philip Siuni, Grigor Mamikonean, Grigor Supan, Sahl Smbatean, Stepanos Kon Sevordik, Nerseh of Gardman, Ktritch of Gardman, and Esayi Abumushe, all sent to Abbasid capital of Samarra.

Bugha completed his campaign over the course of three years. He systematically occupied Armenia, beginning in the south with Taron and Vaspurakan, then reaching the Araxe and Kur river basins. Some Armenian nobles facilitated the reconquest by collaborating with Arab forces and betraying their compatriots to secure their own positions. By the time of Bugha's return to Samarra in 855, most of the princes of Arminiya, both Christian and Muslim, were captives in the Caliph's court along with their sons.

The 850–855 Armenian revolt was the last in a series of revolts in Arabic Arminiya.

== Aftermath ==
Bugha's campaign also facilitated the territorial expansion of several Arab tribal groups throughout Armenia. The Uthmanid tribe, which had previously settled near Lake Van during earlier migration periods under caliph Harun al-Rashid (r. 786–809), used the instability to seize additional territory from the Gnuni family around Berkri and extended their influence toward the Amiwk fortress and Varag region. Similarly, the Shaybani and Sulami tribes expanded their domains, with the Shaybani reaching the shores of Lake Van at Datwan. The Sulami established control over Apahunik during this period. These Arab settlements were reinforced by new migrants who had accompanied Bugha's forces, fundamentally altering the demographic and political landscape of the region.

After the suppression of the revolt, the Armenian princes were released. Despite accompanying Bugha's campaigns as sparapet, Smbat VIII secretly aided local Christians, including warning the Mtiul people not to let Bugha pass when he attempted to invade Alania. However, he was ultimately taken to Samarra with the other princes and executed for refusing to convert to Islam. Bagrat was succeeded by his sons Ashot and David as rulers of Taron, although a portion of the region seems to have passed to Abu Belj, the son of Gurgen I Artsruni.

The title of sparapet was given to Ashot V Bagratuni, who in 862 also was granted the title "prince of princes" by the Abbasid Caliph, al-Musta'in. This title essentially granted Ashot V the status of de facto king, and placed him at a similar level of power as the emirs, but did not allow him to have administrative rule over the kingdom. He later managed to establish the virtually independent Bagratid kingdom of Armenia in 884.

== Sources ==
- Gordon, Matthew S. (2001). The Breaking of a Thousand Swords: A History of the Turkish Military of Samarra (A.H. 200–275/815–889 C.E.). Albany, New York: State University of New York Press. ISBN 0-7914-4795-2.
- Hovannisian, Richard G. (2004). The Armenian People From Ancient to Modern Times, Volume I: The Dynastic Periods: From Antiquity to the Fourteenth Century. Palgrave Macmillan. ISBN 1-4039-6636-2.
- Garsoïan, Nina (2004) [1997]. "The Independent Kingdoms of Medieval Armenia". Armenian People form Ancient to Modern Times, vol. I : The Dynastic Periods: From Antiquity to the Fourteenth Century. Palgrave Macmillan. ISBN 978-1403964212.
- Grousset, René (2008) [1947]. Histoire de l'Arménie des origines à 1071 [History of the Origins of Armenia until 1071] (in French). Paris. ISBN 978-2-228-88912-4.
- Laurent, Joseph L. (1919). L'Arménie entre Byzance et l'Islam: depuis la conquête arabe jusqu'en 886 (in French). Paris: De Boccard.
- Martin-Hisard, Bernadette (2007) [1982]. "Domination arabe et libertés arméniennes (VII^{e} ‑ IX^{e} siècle)" [Arab Domination and Armenian Freedom (8th–9th Century)]. Histoire du peuple arménien [History of the Armenian People] (in French). Toulouse. pp. 213–241. ISBN 978-2-7089-6874-5.
- Minorsky, V. F (March 1958). A History of Sharvān and Darband in the 10th-11th Centuries. Cambridge: W. Heffer & Sons Ltd. pp. 1–187.
- Shahinyan, A. K. (2008). "Последнее восстание в арабской провинции Арминийа (850-855 гг.)" [The last revolt in the Arab province of Arminiya (850-855)]. Вестник Санкт-Петербургского Университета. Серия 2: История (in Russian). 4 (1). Saint Petersburg State University: 108–117.
- Ter-Ghewondyan, Aram (1976) [1965]. The Arab Emirates in Bagratid Armenia. Translated by Garsoïan, Nina. Lisbon: Livraria Bertrand.
- Whittow, Mark (1996). The Making of Byzantium, 600-1025. University of California Press. ISBN 978-0-520-20496-6.
- Douri, Abdulaziz (2007) [1945]. دراسات في العصور العباسية المتأخرة [Studies on the Late Abbasid Era] (in Arabic). Centre for Arab Unity Studies. ISBN 9789953823614.
