= Musa ibn Zurara =

Musa ibn Zurara (Arabic: موسى بن زرارة; fl. early 850s) was the emir of Arzen, located on the borders between Upper Mesopotamia (Arabic: al-Jazira) and Armenia, which at the time were provinces of the Abbasid Caliphate.

Musa is the first attested member of his family, and he is only mentioned in the sources by name and patronymic, without a nisba. Consequently, the exact origin and history of his family prior to him is unknown; however they had clearly settled in Arzanene (Armenian: Aghdznik) as part of the wider influx of Arab tribes into Armenia that began under Harun al-Rashid (r. 786–809), and may well have been members of the Banu Bakr tribe, much like the Shaybanids who dominated the area of Diyar Bakr. Musa's fief of Arzen was the capital of the district of Arzanene, which in turn was held to belong to the Jaziran sub-province of Diyar Bakr.

It is known that Musa had five brothers: Sulayman, Ahmad, Isa, Muhammad, and Harun. In common with other Arab leaders in Armenia, Musa married the sister of a Christian Armenian prince, Bagrat II Bagratuni, whose province of Taron bordered Musa's own domain of Arzanene. His ties to the powerful Bagratuni prince certainly strengthened Musa's own position against other rivals, both Christian and Muslim, but it did not stop him from developing a certain enmity towards Bagrat and taking up arms against him. Thus, when the Abbasid governor, Abu Sa'id Muhammad al-Marwazi, sought to reduce the power and autonomy of the Armenian princes, that had grown greatly during the previous years, he chose Musa and another local Arab lord, al-Ala ibn Ahmad al-Azdi. Musa invaded Taron, while al-Ala attacked the other great southern Armenian principality of Vaspurakan, ruled by Ashot I Artsruni. Ashot defeated al-Ala and evicted him from his territory, and then went to the assistance of Bagrat. The Armenian armies faced and defeated Musa near the capital of Taron, Mush, and pursued him until Baghesh, stopping only after the entreaties of Musa's wife, the sister of Bagrat.

The Armenians then proceeded to massacre the Arab settlers in Arzanene. At this time, Abu Sa'id invaded Armenia with his own army, but died on the way, and was succeeded by his son Yusuf. The latter managed to capture Bagrat and sent him as a prisoner to the Abbasid capital Samarra, but he was later attacked and killed by the inhabitants of Khoyt in early 852. This prompted the Caliph to intervene in force by sending the general Bugha al-Kabir to Armenia. Musa appears to have joined the Armenian uprising at some point; Bugha also accused him of having been involved in the murder of Yusuf. As a result, he and was also carried into captivity to Samarra by Bugha al-Kabir.

After Musa died, he was succeeded by his son Abu'l-Maghra. In order to safeguard his domain against the Shaybanids, he allied himself closely with the Artsruni, marrying an Artsruni princess and even secretly converting to Christianity. In c. 890 he was taken prisoner by the ambitious Shaybanid ruler of Diyar Bakr, Ahmad ibn Isa al-Shaybani, who annexed the Zurarid domains.

== Sources ==
- Frye, R. N. (1960). "Arzan". In Gibb, H. A. R.; Kramers, J. H.; Lévi-Provençal, E.; Schacht, J.; Lewis, B. & Pellat, Ch. (eds.). The Encyclopaedia of Islam, Second Edition. Volume I: A–B. Leiden: E. J. Brill. pp. 679–680. doi:10.1163/1573-3912_islam_SIM_0749. OCLC 495469456.
- Ter-Ghewondyan, Aram (1976) [1965]. The Arab Emirates in Bagratid Armenia. Translated by Garsoïan, Nina. Lisbon: Livraria Bertrand. OCLC 490638192.
