= Abu'l-Maghra ibn Musa ibn Zurara =

Amir Zarari in Arzin, between the Euphrates region and the Armenian principality

Abu'l-Maghra ibn Musa ibn Zurara (Arabic: ابو المقرئ بن موسى بن زرارة) was the last Zurarid emir of Arzen, located on the borders between Upper Mesopotamia (Arabic al-Jazira) and Armenia, which at the time were provinces of the Abbasid Caliphate.

He was the son of Musa ibn Zurara, the first known Zurarid lord of Arzen, and the sister of a Christian Armenian prince, Bagrat II Bagratuni, whose province of Taron bordered Musa's own domain of Arzen. Arzen was the capital of the district of Arzanene (Armenian: Aghdznik), and held to belong to the Jaziran sub-province of Diyar Bakr.

Abu'l-Maghra succeeded his father after the latter's death. In order to safeguard his domain against the Shaybanids who dominated the district of Diyar Bakr, he allied himself closely with the other powerful Armenian dynasty, the Artsruni of Vaspurakan, marrying an Artsruni princess and even secretly converting to Christianity.

At the same time, he remained formally a subordinate of the Shaybanid ruler of Diyar Bakr, Isa ibn al-Shaykh, and had to support him in his conflicts. Thus, when Isa was appointed as governor of Palestine in December 866, it was Abu'l-Maghra who was sent to Ramla to take over the administration as Isa's deputy. In c. 879/80 both Isa and Abu'l-Maghra allied with other local potentates, such as the local Kharijites under a certain Ishaq ibn Ayyub and the Taghlibi chieftain Hamdan ibn Hamdun, against the ambitions of the Turk Ishaq ibn Kundajiq, who ruled Mosul and had ambitions to govern all of the Jazira. This coalition managed to defeat Ibn Kundajiq, but the latter's position was soon bolstered by receiving appointment by the Caliph as governor of Diyar Rabi'a and Armenia (879/80). Isa and Abu'l-Maghra then secured peace by offering a tribute 200,000 gold dinars to be confirmed in their possessions. Ibn Kundajiq initially accepted, but in 880/1 the coalition against him was renewed, and open warfare broke out. This time, Ibn Kundajiq was victorious in a battle fought in April/May 881, driving his opponents before him to Amid, which he left under siege. A few inconclusive skirmishes followed, and the situation was not resolved by the time of Isa's death in 882/3, as Ibn Kundajiq became involved in the Abbasid efforts to recover Syria from the Tulunids.

In c. 890 he was taken prisoner by the ambitious son of Isa ibn al-Shaykh, Ahmad, who imprisoned Abu'l-Maghra and annexed the Zurarid domains.

== Sources ==
- Canard, Marius (1978). "ʿĪsā b. al-S̲h̲ayk̲h̲". In van Donzel, E.; Lewis, B.; Pellat, Ch. & Bosworth, C. E. (eds.). The Encyclopaedia of Islam, Second Edition. Volume IV: Iran–Kha. Leiden: E. J. Brill. pp. 88–91. doi:10.1163/1573-3912_islam_SIM_3601. OCLC 758278456.
- Fields, Philip M., ed. (1987). The History of al-Ṭabarī, Volume XXXVII: The ʿAbbāsid Recovery: The War Against the Zanj Ends, A.D. 879–893/A.H. 266–279. SUNY Series in Near Eastern Studies. Albany, New York: State University of New York Press. ISBN 978-0-88706-054-0.
- Frye, R. N. (1960). "Arzan". In Gibb, H. A. R.; Kramers, J. H.; Lévi-Provençal, E.; Schacht, J.; Lewis, B. & Pellat, Ch. (eds.). The Encyclopaedia of Islam, Second Edition. Volume I: A–B. Leiden: E. J. Brill. pp. 679–680. OCLC 495469456.
- Saliba, George, ed. (1985). The History of al-Ṭabarī, Volume XXXV: The Crisis of the ʿAbbāsid Caliphate: The Caliphates of al-Mustaʿīn and al-Muʿtazz, A.D. 862–869/A.H. 248–255. SUNY Series in Near Eastern Studies. Albany, New York: State University of New York Press. ISBN 978-0-87395-883-7.
- Ter-Ghewondyan, Aram (1976) [1965]. The Arab Emirates in Bagratid Armenia. Translated by Garsoïan, Nina. Lisbon: Livraria Bertrand. OCLC 490638192.
