= Arminiya =

Province of the Arab Caliphates

- Province of the Umayyad and Abbasid caliphates
- c. 705–884
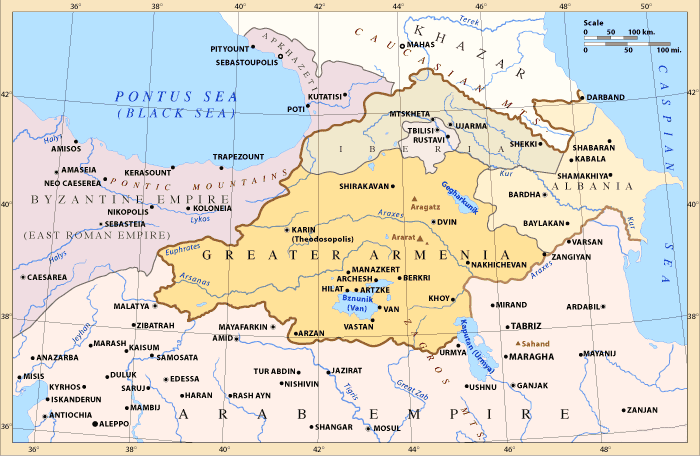
- The province of Arminiya under the Abbasid Caliphate, 750–884
- Capital: Dvin
- Historical era: Middle Ages
  - Muslim conquest of Armenia: 654
  - Province of Arminiya established: c. 705
  - Ashot I declares himself King of Armenia: 884
Preceded by
Persian Armenia
Byzantine Armenia
Albania (satrapy)
Principality of Iberia
Succeeded by
Principality of Hamamshen
Bagratid Armenia
Bagratid Iberia
Kaysites

Arminiya, also known as the Ostikanate of Arminiya or the Emirate of Armenia (Arabic: إمارة أرمينية, imārat armīniya), was a political and geographic designation given by the Muslim Arabs to the lands of Greater Armenia, Caucasian Iberia, and Caucasian Albania, following their conquest of these regions in the 7th century. Though the caliphs initially permitted an Armenian prince to represent the province of Arminiya in exchange for tribute and the Armenians' loyalty during times of war, Caliph Abd al-Malik ibn Marwan introduced direct Arab rule of the region, headed by a governor known as the ostikan with his capital in Dvin.

== History ==
=== Early period: the Arab conquest of Armenia ===
The details of the early conquest of Armenia by the Arabs are uncertain, as the various Arabic sources conflict with the Greek and Armenian sources, both in chronology and in the details of the events. However, the broad thrust of the Arab campaigns is consistent between the sources, allowing for a reconstruction of events by modern scholars.

According to the Arabic sources, the first Arab expedition reached Armenia in 639/640, on the heels of their conquest of the Levant from the Byzantines and the start of the Muslim conquest of Persia. The Arabs were led by Iyad ibn Ghanim and penetrated as far as Bitlis. A second expedition occurred in 642, only to be defeated and pushed out of the country. After this setback, the Arabs only undertook a raid from Adharbayjan in 645, led by Salman ibn Rabi'a, but this only touched the Armenian borderlands. The Muslim sources place the actual conquest of the country in 645/646, under the command of Habib ibn Maslama al-Fihri. The Arabs first moved against the western, Byzantine portion of the country, captured Theodosiopolis (modern-day Erzurum) and defeated a Byzantine army, before subduing the Armenian princes around Lake Van and marching onto Dvin, the capital of the former Persian portion of Armenia. Dvin capitulated after a few days of siege, as did Tiflis further north in Caucasian Iberia. During the same time, another Arab army from Iraq, under Salman ibn Rabi'a, conquered Caucasian Albania (Arran).

Although Arab sources imply that the country was henceforth effectively under Arab rule, modern historians generally consider the contemporary account attributed to the Armenian bishop Sebeos, partly corroborated by the Byzantine chronicler Theophanes the Confessor, more reliable, and have proposed different reconstructions of the early Arab raids between 640 and 650, based on a critical reading of the sources; it is clear, however, that the country did not submit to Arab rule at this time.

Armenian histories report that the Arabs first arrived in 642, penetrating the central region of Ayrarat, and sacked Dvin, returning with over 35,000 captives. In 643, the Arabs invaded again from the direction of Arran, ravaged Ayrarat and reached Iberia, but were defeated in battle by the Armenian leader Theodore Rshtuni and forced back. After this success, Rshtuni was recognized as ruler of Armenia by the Byzantine emperor Constans II, in exchange for accepting Byzantine suzerainty. When Constans' truce with the Arabs ended in 653, however, to avoid a new Arab invasion, Rshtuni voluntarily agreed to submit to Muslim overlordship. Emperor Constans then campaigned in person in Armenia, restoring Byzantine rule, but soon after his departure in early 654, the Arabs invaded the country. With their assistance, Rshtuni evicted the Byzantine garrisons from Armenia and secured Arab recognition as the presiding prince of Armenia, Iberia, and Albania. The Byzantines under general Maurianos tried to recover control of the region, but without success. In 655, even Byzantine Armenia was invaded, and the Arabs occupied Theodosiopolis (Arabic Qaliqala) and cemented their control of the country by taking Rshtuni to Damascus, where he died in 656, and appointing his rival Hamazasp IV Mamikonian in his stead. However, with the outbreak of the First Muslim Civil War in 657, effective Arab authority in the country ceased, and Mamikonian returned to Byzantine overlordship almost immediately.

In 661, however, Mu'awiya, now the victor of the Muslim civil war, ordered the Armenian princes to re-submit to his authority and pay tribute. To avoid another war, the princes complied. The Arab policy of demanding that the tribute be paid in money affected the Armenian economy and society. Coins were struck in Dvin. The Armenians were forced to produce a surplus of food and manufactured goods for sale. A strong urban life was developed in Caucasia as the economy revived.

=== Establishment of direct Muslim control ===
For most of the second half of the 7th century, Arab presence and control in Armenia was minimal. Armenia was considered conquered land by the Arabs but enjoyed de facto autonomy, regulated by the treaty signed between Rshtuni and Mu'awiya. Indeed, as Aram Ter-Ghewondyan comments, under Arab suzerainty "the country enjoyed a degree of independence such as it had not known since the fall of the Arsacids" in the 5th century. According to the terms of the treaty, the Armenian princes were subjected to relatively low taxation and the obligation to provide soldiers when requested, for which the princes were to be paid an annual subsidy of 100,000 dirhams. In exchange, no Arab garrison or official was installed in Armenian lands, and Arab assistance was even promised in the event of a Byzantine attack.

The situation changed in the reign of the caliph Abd al-Malik (r. 685–705). Beginning in 700, the Caliph's brother and governor of Arran, Muhammad ibn Marwan, subdued the country in a series of campaigns. Although the Armenians rebelled in 703 and received Byzantine aid, Muhammad ibn Marwan defeated them and sealed the failure of the revolt by executing the rebel princes in 705. Armenia, along with the principalities of Caucasian Albania and Iberia (modern Georgia) was grouped into one vast province called al-Arminiya, with its capital at Dvin (Arabic Dabil), which was rebuilt by the Arabs and served as the seat of the governor (called the ostikan in Armenian) and of an Arab garrison. For much of the remaining Umayyad period, Arminiya was usually grouped with Arran and the Jazira (Upper Mesopotamia) under a single governor into an ad hoc super-province. According to the historian Stephen H. Rapp in the third edition of the Encyclopaedia of Islam:

Early Arabs followed Sāsānian, Parthian Arsacid, and ultimately Achaemenid practice by organising most of southern Caucasia into a large regional zone called Armīniya (cf. the Achaemenid satrapy of Armina covering much of southern Caucasia and the subsequent Kūst-i Kapkōh of the Sāsānians).

Arminiya was governed by an ostikan, (Note: An Iranian title meaning 'sure', 'faithful', or 'loyal'.) sometimes called an amir or wali (i.e. governor), headquartered at Dvin, whose role however was limited to defence and the collection of taxes: the country was largely run by the local princes—the nakharars. For most of the Umayyad period (654–750), the province was divided into four regions: Arminiya I (Caucasian Albania), Arminiya II (Caucasian Iberia), Arminiya III (the area around Aras River), Arminiya IV (Taron). The local nobility was headed, as in Sasanian times, by a presiding prince (ishkhan), a title which in the 9th century, beginning probably with Bagrat II Bagratuni, evolved into the title of "prince of princes" (ishkhanats’ ishkhan). Acting as the head of the other princes, the ishkhanats’ ishkhan was answerable to the Arab governor, being responsible for the collection of the taxes owed to the caliphal government and the raising of military forces when requested.

A census and survey of Arminiya was undertaken c. 725, followed by a significant increase in taxation so as to finance the Caliphate's increasing military needs in various fronts. The Armenians participated with troops in the hard-fought campaigns of the Second Arab–Khazar War in the 720s and 730s. As a result, in 732, governor Marwan ibn Muhammad (the future Caliph Marwan II) named Ashot III Bagratuni as the presiding prince of Armenia, an act which essentially re-confirmed the country's autonomy within the Caliphate.

=== Abbasid period until 884 ===
Per al-Ya'qubi, under the Abbasids (750–884) the province comprised only three parts: Armenia proper, Jurzan (Georgia), and Arran (including Sharwan and Bab al-Abwab, i.e. the Derbend pass). In the first half of the 9th century, al-Arminiya refers only to Armenia proper, whereas Jurzan, Arran, and Bab al-Abwab and Sharwan were considered separate units. Ibn Hawqal (fl. 980) records the existence of two "Armenias": 1) Outer Armenia, encompassing the area around Lake Van, and 2) Inner Armenia, containing regions to the north from Qaliqala (Theodosiopolis) to Dvin and Nakhchavan. The various Caucasian principalities maintained their existence within these official Arab divisions, as did several Arab emirates. Arminiya was bordered to the west by the thughurs (military zones) of Mesopotamia, Qaliqala and Syria, which were governed separately and defended the caliphate's frontier with the Byzantine Empire. Around 780, Dvin was taken by the Qaysid emirs, causing the ostikan to move his seat to Bardha'a in Arran.

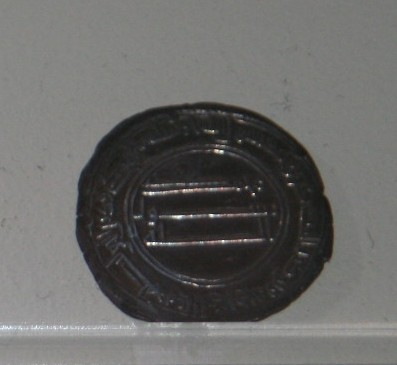
Dirham of the Abbasid Caliphate, minted in Arminiya province

With the establishment of the Abbasid Caliphate after the Abbasid Revolution, a period of repression was inaugurated. This was followed by Caliph al-Mansur revoking the privileges and abolishing the subsidies paid to the various Armenian princes (the nakharars) and imposing harsher taxation, leading to the outbreak of another major rebellion in 774. The revolt was suppressed in the Battle of Bagrevand in April 775. The failure of the rebellion saw the near-extinction, reduction to insignificance or exile to Byzantium of some of the most prominent nakharar families, most importantly the Mamikonian. In its aftermath, the Caliphate tightened its grip on the Transcaucasian provinces: the nobility of neighbouring Iberia was also decimated in the 780s, and a process of settlement with Arab tribes began which by the middle of the 9th century led to the Islamization of Caucasian Albania, while Iberia and much of lowland Armenia came under the control of a series of Arab emirates. At the same time, the power vacuum left by the destruction of so many nakharar clans was filled by two other great families, the Artsruni in the south (Vaspurakan) and the Bagratuni in the north.

Despite several insurrections, the Emirate of Armenia lasted until 884, when the Bagratuni Ashot I, who had managed to win control over most of its area, declared himself "King of the Armenians". He received recognition by Caliph Al-Mu'tamid of the Abbasid dynasty in 885 and Byzantine Emperor Basil I of the Macedonian dynasty in 886.

Ashot was swiftly able to expand his power. Through family links with the two next most important princely families, the Artsruni and the Siwnis, and through a cautious policy towards the Abbasids and the Arab emirates of Armenia, by the 860s he had succeeded in becoming in fact, if not yet in name, an autonomous king.

== Arab governors of Armenia ==
=== Early governors ===
These are reported as governors under the Caliphs Uthman (r. 644–656) and Ali (r. 656–661), as well as the early Umayyads:

- Hudhayfah ibn al-Yaman
- Mughira ibn Shu'ba
- Al-Qasim ibn Rabi'a ibn Umayya ibn Abi al-Salt al-Thaqafi
- Habib ibn Maslama al-Fihri
- Al-Ash'ath ibn Qays al-Kindi (ca. 657)
- Al-Muhallab ibn Abi Sufra (ca. 686)

=== Emirs (Ostikans) ===
With the submission of Armenia to Muhammad ibn Marwan after 695, the province was formally incorporated into the Caliphate, and an Arab governor (ostikan) installed at Dvin:

- Muhammad ibn Marwan (c. 695–705), represented by the following deputies:
  - Uthman ibn al-Walid ibn Uqba
  - Abdallah ibn Hatim al-Bahili
- Abd al-Aziz ibn Hatim al-Bahili (706–709)
- Maslama ibn Abd al-Malik (709–721)
- Al-Jarrah ibn Abdallah (721–725)
- Maslama ibn Abd al-Malik (725–729)
- Al-Jarrah ibn Abdallah (729–730)
- Maslama ibn Abd al-Malik (730–732)
- Marwan ibn Muhammad (732–733)
- Sa'id ibn Amr al-Harashi (733–735)
- Marwan ibn Muhammad (735–744)
- Ishaq ibn Muslim al-Uqayli (744–750)
- Abu Ja'far Abdallah ibn Muhammad (750–753)
- Yazid ibn Asid ibn Zafir al-Sulami (753–755)
- Sulayman (755–?)
- Salih ibn Subai al-Kindi (c. 767)
- Bakkar ibn Muslim al-Uqayli (c. 769–770)
- al-Hasan ibn Qahtaba (770/771–773/774)
- Yazid ibn Asid ibn Zafir al-Sulami (773/774–778)
- Uthman ibn 'Umara ibn Khuraym (778–785)
- Khuzayma ibn Khazim (785–786)
- Yusuf ibn Rashid al-Sulami (786–787)
- Yazid ibn Mazyad al-Shaybani (787–788)
- Ubaydallah ibn al-Mahdi (788–791) (?)
- Abd al-Qadir (791)
- Al-Fadl ibn Yahya al-Barmaki (791–793)
- Umar ibn Ayyub al-Kinani (793)
- ? (793)
- Khalid ibn Yazid al-Sulami (793–794)
- Al-Abbas ibn Jarir ibn Yazid al-Bajali (794)
- Musa ibn Isa ibn Musa al-Hashimi (794–795)
- Yahya ibn Sa'id al-Harashi (795)
- Ahmad ibn Yazid ibn Usayd al-Sulami (795–797)
- Sa'id ibn Salm al-Bahili (797–799)
- Nasr ibn Habib al-Muhallabi (799)
- Ali ibn Isa ibn Mahan (799)
- Yazid ibn Mazyad al-Shaybani (799–801)
- Asad ibn Yazid al-Shaybani (801–802)
- Muhammad ibn Yazid al-Shaybani (802–803)
- Khuzayma ibn Khazim (803–?)
- Sulayman ibn Yazid (807–808)
- Asad ibn Yazid al-Shaybani (c. 810)
- Ishaq ibn Sulayman al-Hashimi (c. 813)
- Khalid ibn Yazid ibn Mazyad al-Shaybani (813–?) (828–832), (841), (c. 842–844)
- Muhammad ibn Khalid al-Shaybani (c. 842/844–?)
- Abu Sa'id Muhammad al-Marwazi (849–851)
- Yusuf ibn Abi Sa'id al-Marwazi (851–852)
- Bugha al-Kabir (852–855)
- Muhammad ibn Khalid al-Shaybani (857–862)
- Ali ibn Yahya al-Armani (862–863)
- al-Abbas ibn al-Musta'in (863–865)
- Abdallah ibn al-Mu'tazz (866–867)
- Abi'l-Saj Devdad (867–870)
- Isa ibn al-Shaykh al-Shaybani (870–875, nominally until 882/3)
- Ja'far Al-Mufawwid (875–878)
- Muhammad ibn Khalid al-Shaybani (878)

== Presiding princes of Armenia ==
- Mjej II Gnuni, 628–635
- David Saharuni, 635–638
- Theodore Rshtuni, 638–645
- Varaztirots II Bagratuni, 645
- Theodore Rshtuni, 654–655
- Mushegh IV Mamikonian, 654
- Theodore Rshtuni, 654–655
- Hamazasp IV Mamikonian, 655–658
- Gregory I Mamikonian, 662–684/85
- Ashot II Bagratuni, 686–690
- Nerses Kamsarakan, 689–691
- Smbat VI Bagratuni, 691–711
- Ashot III Bagratuni, 732–744
- Gregory II Mamikonian, 745–746
- Ashot III Bagratuni, 746–748
- Gregory II Mamikonian, 748
- Mushegh VI Mamikonian, 748–753
- Sahak VII Bagratuni, 755–761
- Smbat VII Bagratuni, 761–775
- Ashot IV Bagratuni, 806–826
- Bagrat II Bagratuni, 830–851
- Ashot V Bagratuni, 862–884

== See also ==
- Greater Armenia
- Islam in Armenia
- Armenian Revolt (850–855)

== Sources ==
- Armen, Garbis (1987). Historical Atlas of Armenia. New York: A. N. E. C.
- Blankinship, Khalid Yahya (1994). The End of the Jihâd State: The Reign of Hishām ibn ʻAbd al-Malik and the Collapse of the Umayyads. Albany, New York: State University of New York Press. ISBN 978-0-7914-1827-7.
- Bournoutian, George (1993). A History of the Armenian People, Volume I: Pre-History to 1500 AD. Costa Mesa, CA: Mazda Publishers.
- Canard, Marius & Cahen, Claude (1960). "Armīniya". In Gibb, H. A. R.; Kramers, J. H.; Lévi-Provençal, E.; Schacht, J.; Lewis, B. & Pellat, Ch. (eds.). The Encyclopaedia of Islam, Second Edition. Volume I: A–B. Leiden: E. J. Brill. pp. 634–640. doi:10.1163/1573-3912_islam_COM_0064. OCLC 495469456.
- Douglas, John (1992). The Armenians. New York: J. J. Winthrop Corp.
- Hewsen, Robert H. (2001). Armenia: A Historical Atlas. University of Chicago Press.
- Jones, Lynn (2007). Between Islam and Byzantium: Aght'amar and the Visual Construction of Medieval Armenian Rulership. Ashgate Publishing, Ltd. ISBN 978-0754638520.
- Laurent, Joseph L. (1919). L'Arménie entre Byzance et l'Islam: depuis la conquête arabe jusqu'en 886 (in French). Paris: De Boccard.
- Morgan, Jacques de (1918). The History of the Armenian People: From the remotest times to the present day. Translated by Ernest F. Barry. Boston: Hairenik Press. OL 5788153M.
- Ter-Ghewondyan, Aram (1976) [1965]. The Arab Emirates in Bagratid Armenia. Translated by Garsoïan, Nina. Lisbon: Livraria Bertrand.
- Ter-Ghewondyan, Aram (1977). "Arminiayi ostikanneri zhamanakagrutʻyune" Արմինիայի ոստիկանների ժամանակագրությունը [Chronology of the ostikans of Arminiya]. Patma-Banasirakan Handes (1): 117–128.
- Whittow, Mark (1996). The Making of Byzantium, 600–1025. Berkeley and Los Angeles, California: University of California Press. ISBN 978-0-520-20496-6.
