= Arzen =

- Fortress town
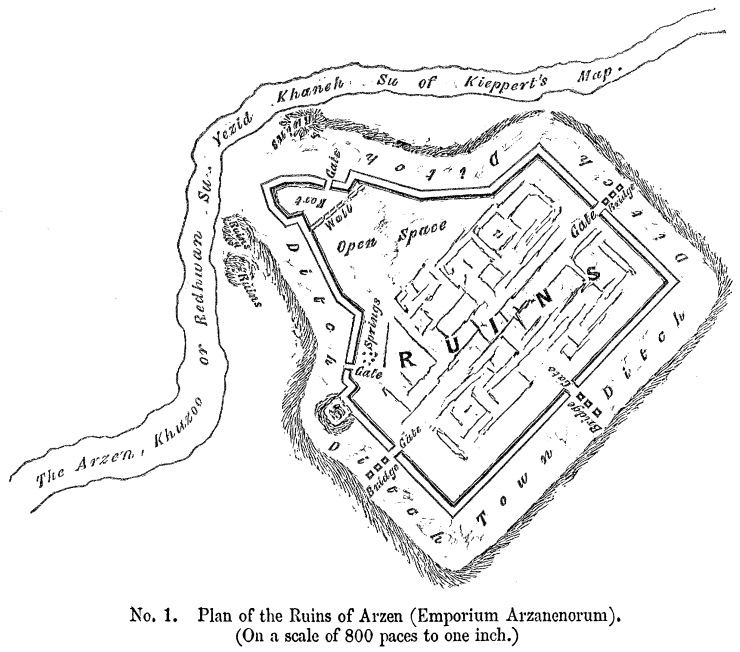
- Sketch of the town's outline by John George Taylor, from his Travels in Kurdistan (1865)

- Location within Turkey
- Coordinates: 37°58′26″N 41°23′05″E
- Country: Turkey
- Province: Siirt Province

Arzen (in Syriac Arzŏn or Arzŭn, Armenian Arzn, Ałzn, Arabic Arzan) was an ancient and medieval city, located on the border zone between Upper Mesopotamia and the Armenian Highlands. The city has a Pahlevi Persian name, Arzin from the infinitive Arzidan: to be valuable, and its name means Arzidani: Valuable. The site of the ancient Armenian capital of Tigranocerta, according to modern scholars, in Late Antiquity it was the capital of the district of Arzanene, a Syriac bishopric and a Sasanian Persian border fortress in the Roman–Persian Wars of the period. After the Muslim conquests, it briefly became the seat of an autonomous dynasty of emirs in the 9th century, before being devastated in the wars between the Byzantine Empire and the Hamdanids in the 10th century. By the 12th century, it had been abandoned and ruined. Today, few traces of the town survive.

== Antiquity ==
The origin of the name Arzĕn (reflecting the Armenian pronunciation) is unknown, but non-Armenian. Its site, on the banks of the river Garzan Su (ancient Nicephorius) in southeastern Turkey, was visited and identified in the early 1860s by John George Taylor, then British consul in Diyarbakir, who sketched its outline in his Travels in Kurdistan (Journal of the Royal Geographical Society, Vol. 35, 1865).

In 1995–96 (The site of Tigranocerta, in Revue des Études Arméniennes, Vol. 25, pp. 183–254 & Vol. 26, pp. 51–118), T. A. Sinclair identified Arzen with the site of Tigranocerta, the capital of the ancient Kingdom of Armenia founded by Tigranes the Great, instead of previously current identifications with Martyropolis or Kızıltepe.

In Classical Antiquity, Arzen was the chief city and capital of the district of Arzanene. Under the Kingdom of Armenia, Arzanene was governed by a march-warden (bdeašx). In the peace of 297, the city along with the rest of the district of Arzanene, and the neighbouring districts of Sophene, Ingilene, Zabdicene and Corduene was ceded to the Roman Empire by the Sasanian emperor Narseh, but returned to Sasanian control in 363. The office of bdeašx apparently continued to be filled, as a holder named Hormizd is mentioned by Procopius in 528 leading a Sasanian army.

The city is attested as a bishopric of the Syriac Church for the first time c. 410, as a suffragan of Nisibis. In the 5th and 6th centuries, it was a bastion of the Sasanians in their recurrent wars with the Byzantine Empire. Its strategic importance derived from its location on the route from Amida in Upper Mesopotamia via Lake Van to the Armenian Highlands and the Armenian capitals of Artaxata and Dvin. In 578, according to Theophylact Simocatta, 10,000 people from the district were forcibly resettled by the Byzantines to Cyprus.

== Middle Ages ==
The city surrendered to Iyad ibn Ghanm in 640, during the first wave of the Muslim conquests. Arab geographers included the city in the Jazira (Upper Mesopotamia), specifically in the district of Diyar Bakr, and often referred to it together with nearby Mayyafariqin. The region was fertile and wealthy: according to Qudama ibn Ja'far, the combined revenue of Mayyafariqin and Arzen in Abbasid times amounted to 4.1 million dirhams. Unlike the Armenian regions further north, which eventually formed part of a restored Armenian kingdom in the 9th century, Arzen and other towns on the southern periphery were quickly Arabized, and their population became indistinguishable from the inhabitants of Upper Mesopotamia or Syria. The Banu Shayban tribe, a branch of the Banu Bakr, settled in the wider area and dominated the Diyar Bakr politically until the late 9th century.

=== Zurarid emirate of Arzen ===
Arzen itself came to be ruled by a local Muslim dynasty, the Zurarids, which probably also descended from the Banu Bakr but whose exact origin, relationship to the Shaybanids, and early history are unknown. The first attested member of the dynasty is Musa ibn Zurara in the mid-9th century. The Zurarids intermingled with their Armenian Christian neighbours: Musa married the sister of Bagrat II Bagratuni, while his son Abu'l-Maghra married an Artsruni princess. As a result, the Zurarids tended to side with their Christian neighbours during the 9th century. Indeed, during the Armenian revolt in the early 850s, the emir Musa joined the uprising due to his opposition to the Abbasid governor Yusuf ibn Muhammad ibn Yusuf al-Marwazi, and was one of the Armenian princes carried into captivity in the Abbasid capital Samarra by the Abbasid general Bugha al-Kabir. Threatened by his Shaybanid neighbours, Abu'l-Maghra, a half-Armenian married to an Armenian, even went as far as to secretly convert to Christianity, and join his forces to those of his Artsruni relatives, but in c. 890 he was taken prisoner by the ambitious Shaybanid ruler of Diyar Bakr, Ahmad ibn Isa al-Shaybani, who annexed the Zurarid domains.

=== Later history and abandonment ===
Faced with the Byzantine Empire's expansion under John Kourkouas in the 930s, Arzen came under Hamdanid control. A Hamdanid lieutenant, Ali ibn Ja'far al-Daylami, was appointed its governor, but rebelled against the Hamdanid emir Nasir al-Dawla in 936. The latter sent his brother, Sayf al-Dawla, to defeat the rebel and assume the governorship of the entire Diyar Bakr. During the next decades, Sayf al-Dawla would use the town as a base for his operations against the Armenian principalities to the north or the Byzantines to the west. In the course of these conflicts, the Byzantines sacked Arzen in 942. The Hamdanids soon retook it, but the area remained contested after that. During this period, the Kurds first appeared and settled in the area, quickly supplanting the Arab element.

The town declined in importance from the mid-10th century on, so that the 12th/13th-century geographer Yaqut al-Hamawi reported that it was deserted and in ruins. Apart from Taylor's sketches, little survives of the town today, as the area has been given over to agriculture.

== Sources ==
- Comfort, Anthony Martin (14 May 2009). Roads on the frontier between Rome and Persia: Euphratesia, Osrhoene and Mesopotamia from AD 363 to 602 (Ph.D.). University of Exeter. hdl:10036/68213.
- Frye, R. N. (1960). "Arzan". In Gibb, H. A. R.; Kramers, J. H.; Lévi-Provençal, E.; Schacht, J.; Lewis, B. & Pellat, Ch. (eds.). The Encyclopaedia of Islam, Second Edition. Volume I: A–B. Leiden: E. J. Brill. pp. 679–680. OCLC 495469456.
- Hübschmann, H. (1904). "Die altarmenischen Ortsnamen. Mit Beiträgen zur historischen Topographie Armeniens und einer Karte". Indogermanische Forschungen. 16: 197–490. doi:10.1515/9783110242584.197. hdl:2027/hvd.32044011394731. S2CID 202507377.
- Marquart, Joseph (1901). Ērānšahr nach der Geographie des Ps. Moses Xoranacʽi (in German). Berlin: Weidmannsche Buchhandlung.
- Nicholson, Oliver, ed. (2018). The Oxford Dictionary of Late Antiquity. Oxford: Oxford University Press. ISBN 978-0-19-866277-8.
- Ter-Ghewondyan, Aram (1976) [1965]. The Arab Emirates in Bagratid Armenia. Translated by Garsoïan, Nina. Lisbon: Livraria Bertrand.
