= Muhammad ibn Khalid al-Shaybani =

Muhammad ibn Khalid ibn Yazid al-Shaybani (Arabic: محمد بن خالد بن يزيد الشيباني) was an Arab general and governor for the Abbasid Caliphate, active in the Caliphate's Caucasian provinces in the 9th century.

Muhammad was a member of the Shayban tribe, originally from the Diyar Bakr in the northern Jazira, and the grandson of Yazid ibn Mazyad al-Shaybani. Yazid and his sons established Shaybanid influence over the Caliphate's Transcaucasian provinces by repeatedly occupying the office of governor (ostikan) of Arminiya (a large province encompassing Armenia, modern Azerbaijan, Iberia and Arran). His father Khalid served in the same office no less than four times: in 813/814, 828–832, briefly in 841 and again shortly after, dying in office ca. 844. Muhammad succeeded him in his post, continuing his work of suppressing the various local rebellions by Muslim and Christian princes. After his dismissal, he returned to his ancestral lands in Diyar Bakr, and was re-appointed as ostikan in 857, following the bloody suppression of a major Armenian rebellion under Bugha al-Kabir. He received the office again in 878, when according to Tovma Artsruni (Thomas Arcruni) he tried to form an alliance with other local Muslim rulers such as the Kaysites to curtail the rising power of the Prince of Princes Ashot Bagratuni, but was defeated and forced to flee the country. He was the last Shaybanid governor of Arminiya.

According to medieval Arabic sources, Muhammad founded the city of Ganja in 859/60, so called because of a treasure unearthed there. According to the legend, the Arab governor had a dream where a voice told him that there was a treasure hidden under one of the three hills around the area where he camped. The voice told him to unearth it and use the money to found a city. He did so and informed the caliph about the money and the city. Caliph al-Mutawakkil made Muhammad the hereditary governor of the city on a condition that he would give the money he found to the caliph.

== Sources ==
- Ter-Ghewondyan, Aram (1976) [1965]. The Arab Emirates in Bagratid Armenia. Translated by Garsoïan, Nina. Lisbon: Livraria Bertrand.
