= Bagrat II Bagratuni =

Bagrat II Bagratuni (Armenian: Բագրատ Բ Բագրատունի, Arabic: Buqrāṭ ibn Ashūṭ; died after 851) was an Armenian noble of the Bagratid (Bagratuni) family and the presiding prince ("prince of princes") of Arab-ruled Armenia between 830 and 851. He succeeded his father, Ashot IV Bagratuni, as ruler of Taron in 826, and was named presiding prince by the Abbasid Caliph in 830. In 849 he began an open rebellion against Abbasid authority in Armenia. The rebellion provoked the dispatch of Bugha al-Kabir to the country, who crushed the revolt in a three-year campaign. Bagrat was treacherously captured during negotiations in 851 and brought captive to the Abbasid capital Samarra. He was succeeded in Taron by his sons, while the title of presiding prince passed to his nephew, the future King Ashot I of Armenia.

== Life ==
Bagrat was the eldest son of Ashot IV Bagratuni, who by the time of his death in 826 had come to control a large part of Armenia, and was recognized by the Abbasid caliphs as presiding prince (ishkhan) of Armenia. After his death, Bagrat and his brother Smbat divided their father's inheritance between them: Bagrat took the regions of Taron, Khoith and Sassoun, i.e. the family's domains on the Upper Euphrates, while Smbat received the ancestral lands around Bagaran and the Araxes river. In a calculated effort to keep the two brothers divided, the Abbasid government divided Ashot's authority and conferred on Smbat the title of commander-in-chief (sparapet), while Bagrat was named presiding prince four years after his father's death. Bagrat was also probably the first presiding prince to bear the title of "prince of princes" (ishkhan ishkhanats) instead of just "prince of Armenia".

Abbasid calculations proved correct, as the two brothers spent much time quarrelling with each other. In 841, for instance, Bagrat had the Armenian bishops depose the Catholicos of Armenia, John IV, but he was promptly re-installed in his see by Smbat with the assistance of the other princes. Nevertheless, the Armenian princes were able to use the Caliphate's preoccupation with the Khurramite rebellion of Babak Khorramdin to achieve a significant degree of autonomy during this period. Smbat, who had spent time at the caliphal court as a hostage, was more circumspect about openly challenging Arab power than his brother, but both were ultimately too weak to seriously threaten Abbasid predominance for the time being. Thus Bagrat participated in the great campaign of Caliph al-Mu'tasim against the Byzantine Empire in 838, and even fought in the Battle of Dazimon against Emperor Theophilos. In 841, on the other hand, under the leadership of the sparapet Smbat, the Armenians revolted against the appointment as caliphal governor of Khalid ibn Yazid al-Shaybani, who in his previous tenures had become enormously unpopular among both the Christian and the Arab princes of the country. The rebels achieved his recall by the Caliph and his replacement with the weaker and more pliant Ali ibn Husayn, to whom the Armenians not only refused to hand over the expected taxes, but whom they promptly blockaded in his capital, Bardaa.

In this way, throughout the reign of Caliph al-Wathiq (842–847), Armenia remained outside effective Abbasid control, but the accession of the energetic al-Mutawakkil in 847 brought to the throne a ruler determined to reimpose Abbasid authority. In 849, the Caliph appointed a new governor of Arminiya, Abu Sa'id Muhammad al-Marwazi. As he moved to enter Armenia with his army, however, he was met on the border by envoys from Bagrat with gifts and with the promised tribute, in a move calculated to prevent the Arab tax collectors from entering the country. This was an act of open revolt by Bagrat, but Abu Sa'id preferred for the moment to withdraw rather than enter the province. In the next year, Abu Sa'id sent two local Arab lords, al-Ala ibn Ahmad al-Azdi and Musa ibn Zurara (the emir of Arzen, who was married to a sister of Bagrat), to subdue the two southern provinces of Taron and Vaspurakan on the pretext of raising taxes. This resulted in open conflict between the Arabs and Bagrat and the Artsruni ruler of Vaspurakan, Ashot I. Ashot defeated al-Ala and evicted him from his territory, and then went to the assistance of Bagrat. The Armenian armies faced and defeated Musa near the capital of Taron, Mush, and pursued him until Baghesh, stopping only after the entreaties of Musa's wife, the sister of Bagrat. The Armenians then proceeded to massacre the Arab settlers in Aghdznik, prompting the Caliph to intervene in force. Abu Sa'id launched a new expedition in 851 but died on the way, and his son, Yusuf, assumed leadership of the caliphal expedition. The arrival of the Abbasid army in his lands led Ashot Artsruni to prefer a separate peace with the Arabs, forcing Bagrat too to enter into negotiations with Yusuf. During the talks, however, with the connivance of his brother, he was seized and brought to the caliphal capital of Samarra.

Bagrat's arrest provoked his subjects into killing Yusuf the next year. Al-Mutawakkil responded by sending a large army under the Turkic general Bugha al-Kabir into the country. Over the course of three years, Bugha methodically re-occupied and subdued the whole province of Arminiya, from the southern regions of Taron and Vaspurakan up to the principalities of Caucasian Albania and most of Iberia in the north. The princes of Armenia remained divided and focused on their own personal rivalries, facilitating the Abbasid re-conquest by fighting alongside the Caliph's troops and handing over their rivals into captivity. The re-imposition of Abbasid authority was also marked by tens of thousands of executions among the male fighting population, and did not spare the princely families, whether Christian or Muslim, either: by the time of Bugha's return to Samarra in 855, most of the princes of Armenia were captives in the Caliph's court along with their sons. Nevertheless, gradually, the Armenian princes were released and their lands restored to them or their sons: Bagrat was succeeded by his sons Ashot and David as rulers of Taron, although a portion of the region seems to have passed to a member of the Artsruni family, Gurgen I Artsruni the son of Abu Belj. The title of sparapet was given to Ashot V Bagratuni, son of Smbat, who in 862 also became "prince of princes", leading eventually to his establishment of the virtually independent Bagratid Kingdom of Armenia in 884.

== Sources ==
- Jones, Lynn (2007). Between Islam and Byzantium: Aght'amar and the Visual Construction of Medieval Armenian Rulership. Ashgate Publishing, Ltd. ISBN 978-0754638520.
- Laurent, Joseph L. (1919). L'Arménie entre Byzance et l'Islam: depuis la conquête arabe jusqu'en 886 (in French). Paris: De Boccard.
- Lilie, Ralph-Johannes; Ludwig, Claudia; Pratsch, Thomas; Zielke, Beate (2013). Prosopographie der mittelbyzantinischen Zeit Online. Berlin-Brandenburgische Akademie der Wissenschaften. Nach Vorarbeiten F. Winkelmanns erstellt (in German). Berlin and Boston: De Gruyter.
- Ter-Ghewondyan, Aram (1976) [1965]. The Arab Emirates in Bagratid Armenia. Translated by Garsoïan, Nina. Lisbon: Livraria Bertrand.
- Whittow, Mark (1996). The Making of Byzantium, 600–1025. Berkeley and Los Angeles, California: University of California Press. ISBN 978-0-520-20496-6.

Preceded by Ashot IV Bagratuni (Ashot I of Taron)	Prince of Taron; 826–851	Vacant Suspended due to Armenian rebellion Title next held by Ashot II of Taron and David of Taron
Preceded by Ashot IV Bagratuni (Ashot I of Taron)	Prince of princes of Armenia under Abbasid suzerainty 830–851	Vacant Suspended due to Armenian rebellion Title next held by Ashot V Bagratuni
