= John IV of Armenia =

John IV (Armenian: Հովհաննես Դ Ավայեցի) was the Catholicos of the Armenian Apostolic Church in 833–855 when the country was under Abbasid overlordship.

In 841, he was deposed by the episcopal synod through the machinations of Bagrat II Bagratuni, but he was promptly re-installed in his see by Bagrat's brother Smbat with the assistance of the other princes.

It was during John IV's tenure that the Tondrakians first emerged.

== Sources ==
- Laurent, Joseph L. (1919). L'Arménie entre Byzance et l'Islam: depuis la conquête arabe jusqu'en 886 (in French). Paris: De Boccard.
- Ter-Ghewondyan, Aram (1976) [1965]. The Arab Emirates in Bagratid Armenia. Translated by Garsoïan, Nina. Lisbon: Livraria Bertrand. OCLC 490638192.

Preceded by David II of Armenia	Catholicos of the Holy See of St. Echmiadzin and All Armenians; 833–855	Succeeded by Zacharias I of Armenia
