= Asad ibn Yazid al-Shaybani =

Abbasid General and Governor of Arminiyah

Asad ibn Yazid al-Shaybani أسد بن يزيد الشيباني
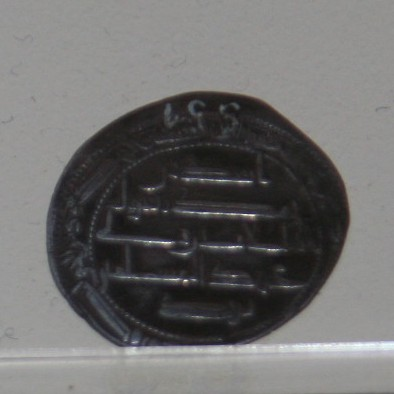
- Abbasid silver Dirham of Asad ibn Yazid in History Museum of Azerbaijan

Abbasid Governor of Arminiyah
- In office 801–802
- Monarch: Harun al-Rashid
- Preceded by: Yazid ibn Mazyad al-Shaybani
- Succeeded by: Muhammad ibn Yazid

Abbasid Governor of Arminiyah
- In office 810–813
- Monarchs: Harun al-Rashid, al-Amin
- Succeeded by: Ishaq ibn Sulayman al-Hashimi

Abbasid Governor of Mosul
- Monarch: Harun al-Rashid

Personal details
- Died: 820s Abbasid Calīphate
- Parent: Yazid ibn Mazyad al-Shaybani
- Military career
- Allegiance: Abbasid Caliphate
- Branch: Abbasid army
- Service years: 790s -810
- Rank: General

Asad ibn Yazid al-Shaybani (Arabic: أسد بن يزيد الشيباني) was an Arab general and governor for the Abbasid Caliphate, active in the early 9th century.

Asad was a member of the Shayban tribe, dominant in the region of Diyar Bakr in the northern Jazira, and son of Yazid ibn Mazyad al-Shaybani, who served twice as Arab governor (ostikan) of Arminiya (a large province encompassing the whole of Transcaucasia). By 801, when his father died, Asad was governor of Mosul, and succeeded him as ostikan for about a year; he was in turn succeeded by his brother Muhammad. Asad was re-appointed as ostikan under Caliph al-Amin (r. 809–813) to confront an uprising of the Arab settlers in Iberia under Yahya ibn Sa'id and Ismail ibn Shu'ayb. Asad was successful in quelling the revolt and capturing its leaders, but he later pardoned and released them, and because of this was dismissed from his office.

== Sources ==
- Ter-Ghewondyan, Aram (1976) [1965]. The Arab Emirates in Bagratid Armenia. Translated by Garsoïan, Nina. Lisbon: Livraria Bertrand.

Preceded by Yazid ibn Mazyad al-Shaybani	Ostikan of Arminiya; 801–802	Succeeded by Muhammad ibn Yazid al-Shaybani
Unknown	Ostikan of Arminiya ca. 810	Succeeded by possibly Ishaq ibn Sulayman
