= Ostikan =

Title used by Armenians for the Governors of the Arab Caliphates

Ostikan (Armenian: ոստիկան) was the title used by Armenians for the governors of the early Caliphates. In modern historiography, it is chiefly used for the caliphal governors of the province of Arminiya, which included Greater Armenia.

== Arab governors of Armenia ==
=== Early governors ===
These are reported as governors under the Caliphs Uthman (r. 644–656) and Ali (r. 656–661), as well as the early Umayyads:

- Hudhayfa ibn al-Yaman
- Al-Mughira ibn Shu'ba
- Al-Qasim ibn Rabi'a ibn Umayya ibn Abi al-Salt al-Thaqafi
- Habib ibn Maslama al-Fihri
- Al-Ash'ath ibn Qays al-Kindi (ca. 657)
- Al-Muhallab ibn Abi Sufra (ca. 686)

=== Emirs (Ostikans) ===
With the submission of Armenia to Muhammad ibn Marwan after 695, the province was formally incorporated into the Caliphate, and an Arab governor (ostikan) installed at Dvin:

- Muhammad ibn Marwan (c. 695–705), represented by the following deputies:
  - Uthman ibn al-Walid ibn 'Uqba ibn Aban Abi Mu 'ayt
  - Abdallah ibn Hatim al-Bahili
- Abd al-Aziz ibn Hatim al-Bahili (706–709)
- Maslamah ibn Abd al-Malik (709–721)
- al-Djarrah ibn Abdallah al-Hakami (721–725)
- Maslamah ibn Abd al-Malik (725–729)
- al-Djarrah ibn Abdallah al-Hakami (729–730)
- Maslamah ibn Abd al-Malik (730–732)
- Marwan ibn Muhammad (732–733)
- Sa'id ibn Amr al-Harashi (733–735)
- Marwan ibn Muhammad (735–744)
- Ishaq ibn Muslim al-Uqayli (744–750)
- Abu Ja'far Abdallah ibn Muhammad (750–753)
- Yazid ibn Asid ibn Zafir al-Sulami (753–755)
- Sulayman (755–?)
- Salih ben Subai al-Kindi (c. 767)
- Bakkar ibn Muslim al-Uqayli (c. 769–770)
- al-Hasan ibn Qahtaba (770/771–773/774)
- Yazid ibn Asid ibn Zafir al-Sulami (773/774–778)
- Uthman ibn 'Umara ibn Khuraym (778–785)
- Khuzayma ibn Khazim (785–786)
- Yusuf ibn Rashid al-Sulami (786–787)
- Yazid ibn Mazyad al-Shaybani (787–788)
- Abd al-Qadir (788)
- Sulayman ibn Yazid (788–799)
- Yazid ibn Mazyad al-Shaybani (799–801)
- Asad ibn Yazid al-Shaybani (801–802)
- Muhammad ibn Yazid al-Shaybani (802–803)
- Khuzayma ibn Khazim (803–?)
- Asad ibn Yazid al-Shaybani (c. 810)
- Ishaq ibn Sulayman (c. 813)
- Khalid ibn Yazid ibn Mazyad (813–?)
- Khalid ibn Yazid ibn Mazyad (828–832), (841), (c. 842-844)
- Muhammad ibn Khalid al-Shaybani (c. 842/844–?)
- Abu Sa'id Muhammad al-Marwazi (849–851)
- Yusuf ibn Abi Sa'id al-Marwazi (851–852)
- Bugha al-Kabir (852–855)
- Muhammad ibn Khalid al-Shaybani (857–862)
- Ali ibn Yahya al-Armani (862–863)
- Al-Abbas ibn al-Musta'in (863 - 865)
- Abdallah ibn al-Mu'tazz (866 - 867)
- Abi'l-Saj Devdad (867 - 870)
- Isa ibn al-Shaykh al-Shaybani (870–875, nominally until 882/3)
- Ja'far al-Mufawwid (875-878)
- Muhammad ibn Khalid al-Shaybani (878)

== Sources ==
- (in Armenian) Ter-Ghevondyan, Aram. "Դիտողություններ «ոստիկան» բառի մասին (Observations on the word "ostikan"). Patma-Banasirakan Handes. 4 (1962), pp. 243–48.
