= Khalid ibn Yazid al-Shaybani =

9th-century Abbasid military general and governor

Khalid ibn Yazid al-Shaybani (in Arabic خالد بن يزيد الشيباني) was an Arab general and governor for the Abbasid Caliphate, active in the second quarter of the 9th century.

Khalid was a member of the Shayban tribe, dominant in the region of Diyar Bakr in the northern Jazira, and third son of Yazid ibn Mazyad al-Shaybani, who served twice as Arab governor (ostikan) of Arminiya (a large province encompassing the whole of Transcaucasia). Khalid served in the same office no less than four times: in 813/814, 828–832, briefly in 841 and again under Caliph al-Wathiq (r. 842–845). In his first tenure, he showed himself conciliatory towards the native Christian population and the nakharar princes, but his second tenure was marked by the brutal suppression of several revolts by local Arab magnates, as well as the harsh treatment of the Christian population.

As a result, when his re-appointment to the office was announced in 841, a rebellion broke out, forcing the Abbasid government to recall him immediately. Nevertheless, al-Wathiq assigned Arminiya to Khalid. The latter arrived in the province at the head of an army, and crushed the opposition, headed by the Muslim rebel Sawada ibn Abd al-Hamid al-Jahhafi and the Christian princes Smbat VIII Bagratuni and Sahak of Syunik at the Battle of Kawakert. He died soon after at Dvin, where he was buried. He was succeeded by his son, Muhammad. His younger son Haytham ibn Khalid ruled in the family's stronghold of Shirvan, and was the first to claim the title of Shirvanshah.

In 822, Khalid briefly served as governor of Egypt, in an attempt by Caliph al-Ma'mun (r. 813–833) to re-establish Abbasid control over the province, which was divided by strife among rival Arab factions. Although supported by the head of the one faction Ali ibn Abd al-Aziz al-Jarawi, Khalid was outmaneuvered by the head of the other, Ubayd Allah ibn al-Sari, and was forced to abandon Egypt.

== Sources ==
- Kennedy, Hugh (1998). "Egypt as a province in the Islamic caliphate, 641–868". In Petry, Carl F. (ed.). The Cambridge History of Egypt, Volume 1: Islamic Egypt, 640–1517. Vol. 1. Cambridge: Cambridge University Press. pp. 62–85. ISBN 0-521-47137-0.
- Ter-Ghewondyan, Aram (1976) [1965]. The Arab Emirates in Bagratid Armenia. Translated by Garsoïan, Nina. Lisbon: Livraria Bertrand.
