= Kaysites =

Medieval emirate in the Armenian highlands

Kaysite dynasty
- c.860–964
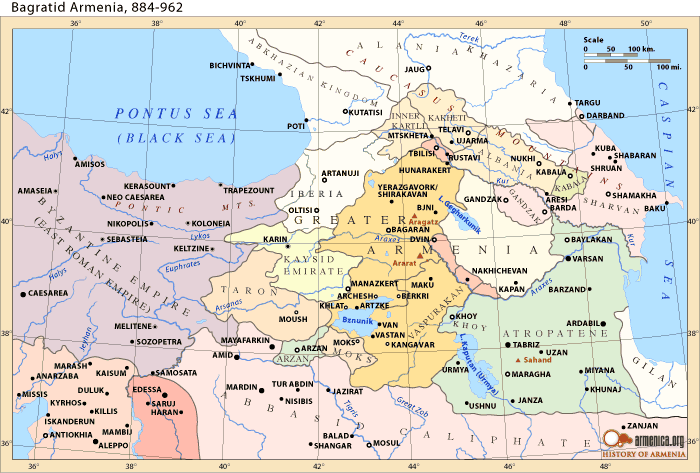
- Capital: Manzikert
- Common languages: Classical Arabic
- Religion: Sunni Islam, Armenian Apostolic Church
- Government: Emirate
- History
  - Established: c.860
  - Disestablished: 964
Preceded by	Succeeded by
Arminiya	Bagratid Armenia

The Kaysite dynasty (Arabic: القيسيين) was a Muslim Arab dynasty that ruled an emirate centered in Manzikert from c. 860 until 964. Their state was the most powerful Arab amirate in Armenia after the collapse of the ostikanate of Arminiya in the late 9th century.

== Origin ==
The Kaysites were members of the Hejazi Banu Sulaym tribe, which had settled in the Jazira after the Muslim conquest. By the reign of the Abbasid Caliph Harun al-Rashid (786–809) the Sulaym which were based in Upper Mesopotamia had probably advanced into the region around Lake Van. Manzikert and the surrounding regions, however, weren't in Arab hands until the rebellion of the Armenians against the Arab ostikan (governor) in 850. This rebellion prompted the caliph al-Mutawakkil (842–861) to send the Turkic general Bugha al-Kabir into Armenia with an army.

Bugha defeated the leading princes of Armenia and took several prisoner, before departing the country in 855. His defeat of the Armenian princes had enabled the Sulaym Arabs to surge into the area of Apahunik', which included the city of Manzikert. By 860 the region had fallen under the control of the first Kaysite amir, Abu'l-Ward.

== Suzerains ==
For most their existence of the Kaysite state, the amirs recognized their stronger neighbors as suzerains, though often these declarations were only nominal and in effect the Kaysites were independent.

When Abu'l-Ward took control of Apahunik', the ostikanate of Arminiya was still extant. As a result, Abu'l-Ward, as with all the other Arab and Armenian rulers in Armenia, were subject to the caliph's ostikans. The ostikans served as protectors of the Kaysites, and relations between them were overall friendly. When a pan-Arab coalition led by the ostikans against the increasingly powerful Christian princes of Armenia in the late 870s was formed, Abu'l-Ward was one of its most powerful members.

The ultimate failure of the coalition against the Christian Armenians foreshadowed the end of the Arminiyan ostikanate in the next decade. In place of the ostikans, in 885 the caliph al-Mu'tamid (870–892) sent a crown to the Bagratid prince Ashot I, thereby restoring the Kingdom of Armenia. This move made the Kaysites subject to Ashot, who Abu'l-Ward was on bad terms with. By the late 890s the reigns of both Ashot and Abu'l-Ward were at an end; Ashot was succeeded by his son Smbat I (890–912) while Abu'l-Ward's three grandsons eventually assumed power. When Smbat I fell into difficulties early in his reign Abu'l-Ward's grandsons revolted against his authority but were defeated in battle. They were forced to resume paying tribute to the king and to send hostages.

Smbat I was murdered by the Sajid amir of Azerbaijan in 912 and was eventually succeeded by his son Ashot II (914–928). During the civil war following Smbat's death the Kaysites ceased to recognize the suzerainty of the Bagratids. At the same time, however, the Byzantine Empire became active in Armenian affairs. The proximity of the Byzantines compelled the three grandsons of Abu'l-Ward to begin forwarding tribute to the Empire. Other than the tribute, Byzantine authority over the Kaysites was restricted, although periodic raids by them into Kaysite territory are recorded.

In 940 the Hamdanid amir Sayf al-Daula came to Ahlat, where the Kaysite amirs pledged allegiance to him. From this point on the Kaysites were Hamdanid vassals, and remained so until the end of their rule in 964.

== Kaysite rulers ==
The first Kaysite amir, Abu'l-Ward, ruled from c. 860 until probably the 890s. He was a very active statesman and under him the Kaysites became very influential in Armenia, being rivaled only by the Bagratids, the Artsrunis of Vaspurakan and the princes of Syunik. He took Ahlat from the prince of Taron and, as mentioned above, was one of the leaders of the Arab coalition formed against the Christian princes of Armenia. Even after the coalition was defeated Abu'l-Ward remained active in Armenian affairs; he convinced the Artsruni prince of Vaspurakan to seize and imprison Ashot, the prince of Taron. At the same time, Ashot I (who had not yet been crowned king) invaded Kaysite territory and besieged Manzikert but, when he heard about Ashot of Taron's fate, lifted the siege and headed to Vaspurakan to save him.

Abu'l-Ward was succeeded by his son 'Abd al-Hamid, who ruled for only a short time. He was succeeded by his three sons. The eldest, Abu Sawada, received the chief city of Manzikert, as well as Koroy Jor and Hark'. The second brother, Abu'l-Aswad gained Arces, Ahlat and Arcke, while the third, Abu Salim, received territory in the northwest portion of the Kaysite lands. Relations between the brothers was amicable and, despite this division, the Kaysite state continued to function as one unified unit. It was these three brothers who unsuccessfully rebelled against Smbat I in the late 890s. During this period of joint rule the Kaysite domains were expanded, with the conquest of Berkri from the Arab Uthmanids in the early 10th century.

Some time in the early 10th century the eldest brother, Abu Sawada, died and was succeeded by his son 'Abd al-Rahim. Upon 'Abd al-Rahim's death, his brother Abu'l-Mu'izz was too young to rule so Manzikert and the other lands fell into the hands of Abu'l-Aswad, ruler of Ahlat. When Abu'l-Aswad himself died, his territories were split; the lands he had inherited from 'Abd al-Rahim (including Manzikert) were taken by his remaining brother, Abu Salim, while his original possessions (centered on Ahlat) fell to his adopted son Ahmad. The Kaysite lands were now in the hands of two rulers instead of three. It was around this time that the Kaysites became Hamdanid vassals.

When Abu Salim died, his son Abu'l-Ward [II] inherited his territories. Abu'l-Ward killed Ahmad and took over his possessions, thereby unifying the Kaysite lands. This took place before 952, since this was when the Byzantine Emperor Constantine Porphyrogenitus completed his work De Administrando Imperio which covers many of these events.

Abu'l-Ward remained the sole ruler of the Kaysite amirate until his death. In 964 he was probably murdered by a ghulam of Sayf al-Daula named Nadja who had risen in revolt. Nadja and his two brothers ruled the Kaysite lands until Sayf al-Daula had Nadja murdered. The Hamdanid amir then led an army into Armenia, captured Nadja's brothers and secured his rule over the former territories of the Kaysites. This done, he departed from Armenia in the beginning of 966. The Kaysite lands thereby came under the rule of Sayf al-Daula.

== Aspects of the Kaysite amirates ==
The Arabs of southwest Armenia never constituted a majority of the regional population. Most of the Muslims, who were probably (like the Kaysites) Sulaym Arabs resided in the cities. Consequentially, the Kaysite amirs rule was strongest in the cities that were under their control. Their power was much weaker in the surrounding rural areas, which generally remained under the control of local (Christian) leaders.

Given that the Muslims formed a minority within the Kaysite amirate, the Armenian Christians were given a degree of autonomy when it came to dealing with their own private affairs. Although the sharia prevailed in the governance of Muslims, when resolving issues amongst themselves most Armenians living under the Kaysites followed the canons of the Armenian Church.

In the early years of the Kaysite amirate, the T'ondrakian religious sect was active in the provinces of Apahunik' and Hark'. The T'ondrakians were opposed to both the Armenian Church and the Muslim amirs of Armenia. Abu'l-Ward [I], considering them a threat to his rule, slaughtered a large number of them and executed their leader Smbat Zarehawanc'i. Despite this, the T'ondrakian movement survived into the 11th century and caused trouble for both Armenian ecclesiastical and Byzantine authorities.

Several Kaysite cities lay on the southern of two commercial routes that traversed Armenia from east to west. The traders that passed through Armenia therefore benefited the Kaysite lands. Despite this, the cities of the Kaysites never became major urban centers. Even Manzikert, the capital, was never considered to be a very prosperous city.

Militarily, the Kaysites benefited from a regular influx of ghazi warriors on their way to fight the holy war against the Byzantine Empire. These warriors would travel through Apahunik', which was controlled by the Kaysites, then make their way to Karin, a chief Muslim outpost against the Byzantines. The Kaysites often utilized these ghazi volunteers to reinforce their own army against their enemies. For example, during the revolt of Abu Sawada, Abu'l-Aswad and Abu Salim against Smbat I, the Kaysite army was supported by "Persian raiders who were making attacks on the Greeks [Byzantines]."

== Aftermath of Kaysite rule ==
Hamdanid rule over the former Kaysite territories did not last long. After Sayf al-Daula's death in 967 the fate of the Kaysite lands is unknown for a time, although they were probably in the hands of local rulers. In 969 a Byzantine army raided Apahunik', besieged Manzikert and razed its walls, but the Byzantines made no attempt to maintain a presence in the city. The Bagratid kings eventually gained control of the northern portion of the Kaysite realm. The Artsruni king of Vaspurakan attempted to take the remaining Kaysite lands, including Berkri, Manzikert and Ahlat, though without much success.

Around this time Ahlat and Manzikert were conquered by a Kurdish family, that of the Marwanids. Its leader, Badh ibn Dustak, took advantage of a civil war within the Byzantine Empire and the weakness of the Hamdanids and created a powerful principality stretching from Manzikert to Mosul. Badh's successes proved to be temporary, however, and when he was killed in 990 while attempting to retake Mosul the Marwanid amirate quickly shrank. Most of the former Kaysite lands in their possession were taken by the Georgian Bagrationi King David III, Curopalates of Tao. Only Ahlat remained in the hands of the Marwanids.

David held Apahunik' until his death in 1000. As per agreement with the Byzantines, his domain was incorporated into the Empire. Manzikert henceforth remained in Byzantine hands until the coming of the Seljuks in the mid-11th century.
