= Ashot I of Armenia =

King of Armenia from 885 to 890

Ashot I Աշոտ Ա

King of Armenia
- Reign: 885–890
- Successor: Smbat I the Martyr

Prince of Princes of Armenia
- Reign: 862–885
- Born: c. 820
- Died: 890 (aged 69–70); Gugark, Greater Armenia
- Burial: Bagaran, Armenia
- Spouse: Katranide I
- Issue: Smbat I Sahak; David; Shapuh
- Dynasty: Bagratuni dynasty
- Father: Smbat VIII the Confessor
- Mother: Hripsime
- Religion: Armenian Apostolic

Ashot I (Armenian: Աշոտ Ա; c. 820 – 890) was a king of Armenia who oversaw the beginning of Armenia's second golden age (862 – 977). He was the son of Smbat VIII the Confessor and was a member of the Bagratuni dynasty. In medieval Armenian historiography, he is frequently referred to as Ashot the Great (Ashot Mets) in recognition of his role in restoring Armenian sovereignty.

== Life ==
=== Early life ===
Ashot was born around 820 to Smbat VIII Bagratuni and his wife Hripsime. Smbat VIII was sparapet (supreme commander) and the son of Ashot Msaker, the Prince of Armenia (r. 806–826). Ashot also had a brother named Abas. The family, the Bagratunis, was one of the most powerful in the kingdom, along with the Artsruni. Both families struggled for power through warfare against Arab invaders. Following the devastating invasion of the Abbasid general Bugha al-Kabir (850–855), which resulted in the captivity and exile of many prominent Armenian nobles,The kingdom was later taken over by Armenians who overthrew the Arab government. Smbat VIII was exiled to Samarra, where he later died. Ashot skillfully rebuilt the ruined economy, consolidated the political authority of the Bagratuni house and continued to live in his father's quarters, located around the city of Bagaran. He was married to Katranide. Like Smbat before him, Ashot was named sparapet in 856 by the Abbasid Caliph al-Mutawakkil.

=== Prince of princes of Armenia ===
The Arab-Byzantine frontier zone during Ashot's lifetime.

During the Arab-Byzantine Wars, much of Ashot's territory was located near the main site of conflict. In 862, following the Battle of Karasounk Ashot was recognized as the prince of princes of Armenia, of Georgia and of the lands of the Caucasus by Abbasid Caliph al-Musta'in, who saw this as a measure of protection against the local autonomous emirs. This title essentially granted Ashot the status of de facto king and placed him at a similar level of power as the emirs, but did not allow Ashot to have administrative rule over the kingdom. Ashot kept this status during the reigns of Abbasid Caliphs al-Mu'tazz (866–869), al-Muhtadi (869–870) and al-Mu'tamid (870–892).

Ashot annexed Bagrevand in 862, shortly after the death of the ruling Mamikonian dynasty's head, Grigor Mamikonian. Ashot mediated between Grigor-Derenik Artsruni and Gurgen Artsruni, cousins and members of the Artsruni family who controlled Vaspurakan. Ashot then captured Grigor-Derenik and reduced the size of the cantons around Van. Ashot released Grigor-Derenik to avoid further conflict with the Artsruni family. Ashot later arranged a marriage between his daughter, Sophie, and Grigor-Derenik, in order to reconcile. Ashot also strengthened relations with the Siunia dynasty by arranging another marriage between his second daughter, Mariam, with Prince Vasak Gabur IV. These familial ties helped strengthen relations between Ashot's sons and the surrounding dynasties.

In 862, the army of Gurgen Apupelch Artsruni (about 500) somewhere in Mardastan defeated the Artsruni regiment (about 800) led by Grigor-Derenik Artsruni. In the autumn of the same year, however, again somewhere in Mardastan, the Artsruni regiment (about 500) made a surprise attack on the army of Gurgen Apupelch Artsruni (about 300) and captured Gurgen. Gurgen, however, later managed to escape from captivity. After the previous events, the Armenian prince Ashot Bagratuni, who arrived in Vaspurakan with his army, in turn managed to capture Grigor-Derenik, who had come to him for negotiations, but this time Gurgen Apupelch Artsruni, rising above intra-family conflicts and guided by the interests of the Artsruni themselves, rather abruptly demanded that Ashot Bagratuni release the captive. However, in order to soften the abruptness, Gurgen also suggested that the Bagratuni prince give his daughter Sofi in marriage to the latter, after which the conflicts would be considered truly exhausted. Ashot Bagratuni, who was distinguished by his political foresight, also needed this marriage, judging by everything, as a guarantee of strengthening his positions in Southern Armenia, and as a result, the matter came to a head. The bad thing, however, was that this political calculation was not based on love, as the most important guarantee of the strength of marriage, which would make itself felt in the future and in turn would have far-reaching consequences. One way or another, but already at the end of the year, Sofi was married to Grigor-Derenik, and not only the positions of the Bagratunis in Vaspurakan were greatly strengthened, but also the degree of unity of the Armenians greatly increased. The problem with Gurgen-Apupelch was also resolved, when the latter, no longer claiming high power in the Artsruni dynasty, in fact, continued to rule in the Mardastan province and Andzevac. However, relations within the Artsruni dynasty were regulated only formally, and between the two sides of the conflict continued to remain quite cold.

In 869, through the efforts of the Catholicos of Armenia Zakaria Dzagetsi, a joint council was convened, in which representatives of prominent princely dynasties participated. At that council, a unanimous decision was made to proclaim Ashot Bagratuni the King of Armenia. Ashot foiled the conspiracy of the Armenian police, expelling him from Armenia. He skillfully took advantage of the Arab-Byzantine rivalry. Emperor Basil I asked Ashot to crown him as a representative of the old royal dynasty and conclude an alliance, and the Byzantine Patriarch Photius, proposing a church union, called Ashot "valiant in good lineage, most powerful, highest and most sublime", however, the 869 Shirakavan church council rejected the patriarch's proposal, but at the same time did not refuse the military-political alliance.

The administrative, military and economic power of the country was concentrated in the hands of Ashot, and Arab rule became formal. Ashot was granted the right to collect taxes throughout the country, which sharply reduced the financial resources flowing to the caliphate. Thanks to the centralization of tax revenues and economic revitalization, the state treasuries were filled with gold and silver. The lasting peace established in the country created favorable conditions for the uninterrupted development of agriculture. Cultivated land areas were restored and expanded. Pastures were expanded: in different regions of the country, a rapid growth in cattle breeding was noticeable. Pastures were filled with herds of horses, herds of cattle (cows) and flocks of sheep. In conditions of peace, internal trade expanded significantly, as well as foreign trade relations were revitalized. Crafts received a new impetus, which contributed to the revival of urban life. Cities and villages took on a new look and form. Settlements damaged by wars were restored, construction work intensified both in the royal domains and in the princely estates.Ashot I established new rules for the coexistence of the population. These legal and administrative regulations ensured the security and stability of the economic activities of different classes of society (peasants, artisans, merchants).

Ashot used this support to wage war against the emirs. In 863, Ashot's forces, led by his brother and sparapet Abas Bagratuni, achieved a decisive victory in the Battle of the Forty (Karasunk) near the Araxes River against the Kaysites of Manazkert and their allies, significantly weakening Arab military dominance in the region․ He began by defeating the Kaysites of Manazkert in 863, with the help of his brother and sparapet, Abas Bagratuni.

In 869, through the efforts of Catholicos of Armenia Zakaria Dzagetsi, a unified council was convened, attended by representatives of prominent princely families. At that council, a unanimous decision was made to proclaim Ashot Bagratuni king of Armenia. Ashot foiled the conspiracy of the ostikan of Arminiya by expelling him from Armenia. He skillfully made use of the Arab–Byzantine rivalry. Emperor Basil I asked Ashot to crown him as a representative of an ancient crown-bestowing family and to conclude an alliance, while Patriarch Photius of Byzantium, proposing church union, called Ashot "renowned for nobility, most powerful, highest, and most sublime"; however, the Church Council of Shirakavan of 869 rejected the patriarch's proposal, though without refusing a military-political alliance.

At the end of 877, Muhammad al-Yamani issued a special appeal to Ashot Bagratuni and, predicting that Isa ibn al-Shaykh would soon be removed from the post of ostikan, asked to be recognized as ostikan of Arminiya himself. The Prince of Armenia, while giving his consent, simultaneously requested official Samarra to recognize not Muhammad al-Yamani as ostikan of Arminiya, but Muhammad ibn Khalid al-Shaybani, of the Shaybanid dynasty, who had previously served as ostikan of Arminiya twice. The request of the Armenians was granted, and Muhammad ibn Khalid was declared ostikan of Arminiya for the third time. The latter, however, held office only briefly, and local complications persisted.

In the summer of 880, the Armenian army (approx. 40,000) led by Prince of Armenia Ashot Bagratuni besieged Manazkert from the army of the Kaysite Emirate (approx. 1,000); however, upon learning that Hasan—ruler of Sevan fortress in Vaspurakan (Arjishakovit canton of Vaspurakan) and cousin of Grigor-Derenik—had captured the Artsruni prince, he concluded a truce and marched to Vaspurakan[23]. As a result, Grigor-Derenik was released without a battle, while the Kaysite and Uthmanid emirates recognized the suzerainty of Prince of Armenia Ashot Bagratuni. In 877, he began to fight against the emir of Barda alongside his ostikan; however, failure of this ostikan led to his replacement. The new ostikan made a secret peace treaty with the emir and betrayed Ashot. Ashot learned of the conspiracy against him and sent Abas to disarm the ostikan in Dvin; Abas escorted him to the border under Ashot's orders in order to prevent the caliph's retaliation. Ashot defeated the emirs of Barda and Manazkert, laying siege to the latter city in 884; however, the siege was ceased prematurely. The siege caused Grigor-Derenik to worry about the borders of Taron, which was under Grigor-Derenik's control. Ashot gained control of the Gugark and Utik regions as early as 860.

Ashot's reach also extended to Caucasian Iberia, where some of his Bagratuni family had settled in the late 7th century. There, around 875, he formed an alliance with Bagrat I of Iberia, his stepbrother, against Bagrat's brother, Guaram Mampali. Together, Ashot and Bagrat defeated Guaram. In 881, Ashot formed an alliance with David I of Iberia and Adarnase IV of Iberia, Bagrat's son and grandson, respectively, to defeat Guaram's son, Nasra of Tao-Klarjeti.

=== King of Armenia ===
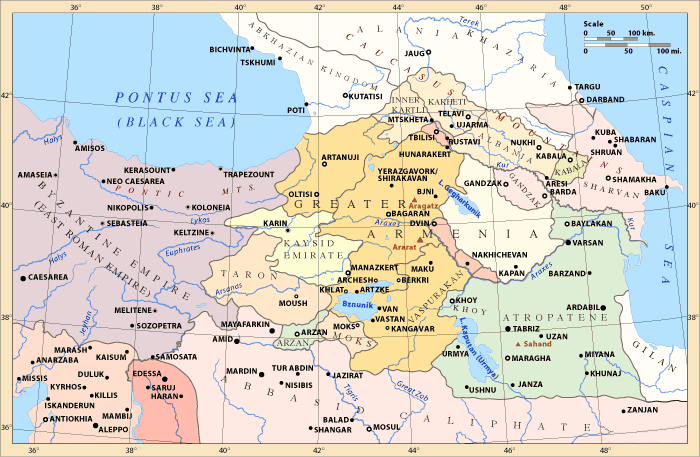
The borders of Bagratid Armenia from 884 to 962.

Ashot strengthened the unity of the country, intervened in disputes that arose between princely houses, and established marital ties between the Bagratuni, Artsruni, and Syuni princely houses.After his brother Abas, he appointed his son Shapuh as sparapet, while his other son, Smbat, became King of Armenia and continued his father's work. Of his three daughters, he gave two in marriage to the Artsrunis: Sophia married Grigor-Derenik and became the senior lady (gaherets tikin) of Vaspurakan, while his other daughter married Vahan Artsruni. His youngest daughter, Mariam, married Vasak Gabur, becoming the senior lady of Syunik. Friendly and allied ties were established not only with influential Armenian princes, but also with the Georgians and Caucasian Albanians. The nobility of the latter had come to be led by the Georgian and Caucasian Albanian branches of the Bagratunis.

Several contemporary prominent Armenians, including Grigor-Derenik Vaspurakan, insisted on Ashot's coronation. Ashot was crowned King of Armenia through the consent of Caliph al-Mu'tamid in 885 to prevent intrusion into Armenian territory by Basil I, a Byzantine emperor of Macedonian origin. Emperor Basil I, who had Armenian roots, also sent Ashot a royal crown along with rich gifts and a letter addressing him as a "beloved brother," acknowledging their shared perceived ancestry from the ancient Arsacid line.

In a grand ceremony in 885, Ashot was solemnly anointed and crowned King of Armenia by Catholicos Gevorg II Garnetsi in the cathedral of Shirakavan (Yerazgavors), in the presence of Armenian princes and representatives of foreign powers.

As a result of his coronation, Ashot restored the Armenian monarchy and became the founder of the medieval Kingdom of Armenia, also known as Bagratid Armenia, named after the contemporary rule of the Bagratunis. The Bagratid kingdom lasted until 1045, when it was annexed into the Byzantine Empire.

Despite his status, Ashot remained a subordinate to the Caliph and was put under the supervision of the emirs of Atropatene. Every Armenian prince fell under Ashot's authority (though in the effect of primus inter pares). Dvin and the emirates of Manazkert and Karin (and, according to Constantine VII, Khoy and Salmas) also fell under Ashot's control, despite the local governments' unwillingness to accept. The emir of Manazkert was in this way defeated and was forced to submit to Ashot's rule in 885.

Ashot's influence continued not only in Armenia but also in Iberia. After the death of Grigor-Derenik Artsruni in 887, Ashot placed his own grandson (and Grigor-Derenik's son), Ashot-Sargis Artsruni, under the rule of relative Gagik Aboumerwan Artsruni. In 887 and 888, Ashot supported his nephew Adarnase IV of Iberia in overthrowing Bagrat I of Abkhazia. Also in 888, Ashot sent his brother Abas to Kars to stop a rebellion led by Prince Sahak-Mleh of Vanand.

Ashot travelled to Gugark to stop another rebellion, fighting alongside his son and heir, Smbat I. He died in 890. Contemporary historian Hovhannes Draskhanakerttsi gives an account of his death:

Since he died on the road, in an inn at a rocky place called K'arsparn, they carried away his body in a coffin and brought it to the town (awan) of Bagaran, the royal residence, where they covered the coffin with robes and veils interwoven and adorned with gold; and carefully selected detachments of military forces clad in arms and ornaments stood guard. The great katholikos, accompanied by the rest of the clerics of the church, also came forth and solemnly chanted psalms and raised the voice of [their] praise. His three sons, the senior [gaherec'] princes of the royal house and other friends followed the coffin, and thus they arrived at the cemetery....Then, building a tomb [suitable] for royalty, they buried him in the cemetery of his ancestors.

Ashot I, who had reigned for 5 to 7 years, was in fact at the head of the country with essentially the powers of a monarch for a full 36 years, doing for his people everything that was truly possible under the given conditions. Indeed, through his governance, this king managed to reach a state where the leaders of both regional superpowers laying claim to Armenia not only did not oppose the royal ambitions of this Armenian ruler, but sent him crowns themselves. No less important was the fact that Ashot I succeeded in unifying the fragmented Christian region shaped by developed feudal social relations, while simultaneously centralizing and directing toward his interests the long-diverged branches of his own dynasty. Finally, as an achievement of this king, it can be recorded that through his domestic policy, he placed the internal life of the country on solid foundations, giving final shape to the state-legal and administrative system of the kingdom.

Ashot displayed great military-political and diplomatic enterprise, strengthening the state. His residence was the fortress of Bagaran.His suzerainty was also recognized by the Georgian and Caucasian Albanian princes and the Arab emirates of Armenia. The Byzantine Emperor Constantine Porphyrogenitus wrote that Ashot "ruled over all the countries of the East".

Ashot also carried out a series of reforms, restoring and modifying the court system that had existed during the time of the Arsacids. He granted lands to lesser nobles, binding them even closer to the royal court.

Smbat I succeeded him.

== Armenian growth under rule ==
In August 862, the Christian rulers of Armenia held a secret meeting in Shirakavan, and as a result, Ashot Bagratuni was recognized as the king of Armenia. The weakening Arab Caliphate authorized Ashot to collect taxes throughout Armenia. The administrative, military, and economic power of the country was concentrated in Ashot's hands, and Arab rule became formal. Ashot was granted the right to collect taxes throughout the country, which sharply reduced the financial resources flowing to the Caliphate. Thanks to the centralization of tax revenues and economic revitalization, the state treasuries were filled with gold and silver. The lasting peace established in the country created favorable conditions for the uninterrupted development of agriculture. Cultivated land areas were restored and expanded. Pastures were expanded; in different regions of the country, a rapid growth in cattle breeding was noticeable. The pastures were filled with herds of horses, herds of cattle (cows) and flocks of sheep. Under conditions of peace, internal trade expanded significantly, as well as foreign trade relations became more active. Craftsmanship received a new impetus, which contributed to the revitalization of urban life. Cities and villages acquired a new look and form. Settlements damaged by wars were restored, construction work was intensified both in the royal domains and in the princely estates. Ashot I established new rules for the coexistence of the population. These legal and administrative regulations ensured the security and stability of the economic activities of different classes of society (peasants, artisans, merchants).

Ashot's restoration of the Armenian monarchy was accompanied by economic growth and a revival of the arts and religion. Several cultural buildings were restored and renovated. Under Ashot's reign, the first khachkar was created in 879 as a tribute to Ashot's wife, Katranide. Urban growth began to occur and agriculture flourished. Vineyards became a very successful industry.

=== Activities ===
In 869, at a joint council of Armenian princes and the highest clergy, Ashot Bagratuni was proclaimed king of Armenia. Uncovering a conspiracy against himself and the Armenian nobles, led by the Arab police chief Ahmad, in 875 Ashot Bagratuni arrested the police chief, disarmed the Arab army, and expelled him from the country with a cudgel.

Armenia, having gained independence and embarked on a path of military and political upsurge, soon attracted the attention of Byzantium. Basil I (867-886), the founder of the Macedonian (Armenian) dynasty, was one of the first to attempt to secure Ashot Bagratuni's support against the caliphate. However, Ashot Bagratuni, having established friendly relations with Basil I, prudently maintained neutrality between the conflicting parties. In order to prevent the Armenian-Byzantine rapprochement and win over Ashot Bagratuni, Caliph Mutawakkil recognized him in 885 as "king of the Armenians and Georgians." The Armenian royal throne was also recognized by Emperor Basil I.

The jurisdiction of the newly established and internationally recognized Bagratid kingdom extended over the greater part of Armenia, with the exception of the western "worlds" annexed by Byzantium (Lesser Armenia, Upper Armenia, Tsopk) and some southern provinces annexed by the Jazira province of the caliphate.

According to Armenian and Arab historians, during the reign of Ashot I Bagratuni (885-890), the borders of the Armenian state included most of the provinces of Korchayk and Agdznik in the south, up to Jazira, in the southeast to Atrapatakan, in the east to Partav, in the west to Tsopk and Bardzr Hayk, in the northwest to Yegerats-Ashkhar, in the north to the Greater Caucasus Range and the Alan Gates. The Georgian prince Atrnerseh Bagratuni and the king of the eastern parts of Armenia (Artsakh, Utik) Hamam Bagratuni submitted to the rule of Ashot I.

Seeking to strengthen the northern borders of the united Armenian-Georgian kingdom, in 887 Ashot I marched to the Greater Caucasus Range, suppressed the local intractable tribes, and forced the king of the Yegerats world to accept his sovereignty. The heir to the throne of Ashot I, Prince Smbat of the Princes' line, suppressed the disobedience of the princes of Gugark and Utik by force of arms and subjugated them to the Bagratid throne. Ashot I then engaged in the construction of the capital Bagaran, improving the country's defense system, and strengthening the army (40 thousand cavalry warriors), leaving to his son Smbat after his death a stable and developing kingdom.

== Religious affairs ==
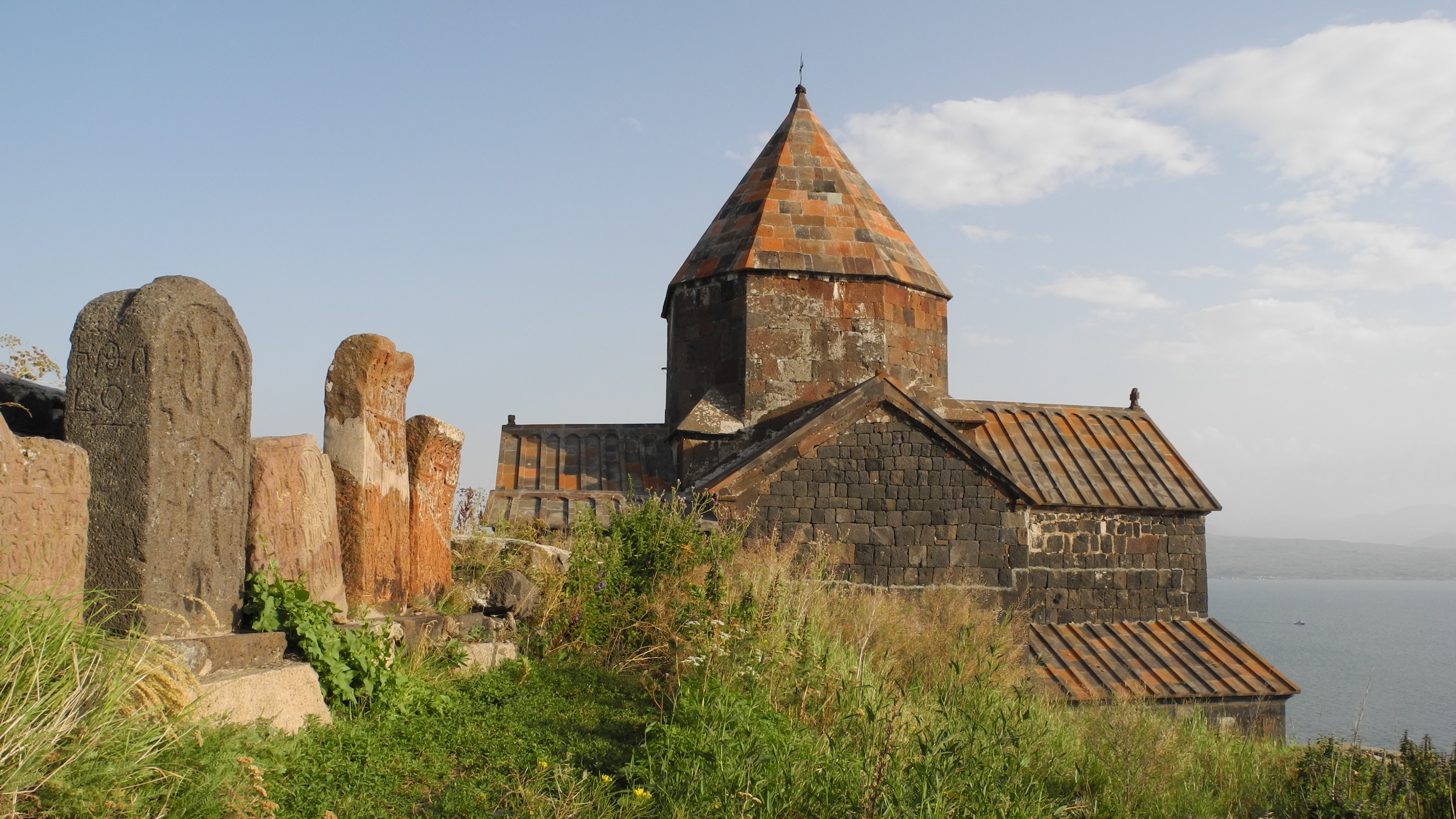
Sevanavank Monastery, founded in 874 by Ashot's daughter Mariam and endowed by Ashot.

Ashot supported the Armenian Apostolic Church during his reign. Ashot saw the possibility of the church merging with the Orthodox Byzantine Church, due to the Byzantine Empire's influence in the region, and feared that the Byzantine Empire would deny him his claim to the throne. In 862, when the Ecumenical Patriarch of Constantinople Photios I attempted to unite the Armenian Church by sending two letters to Catholicos Zacharias I and Ashot, Zacharias and Ashot summoned a council in Yerazgavors; the ambiguous response was formulated by Ashot. Ashot continued to receive epistolary communication; in 882, he received a letter with a piece of the True Cross awarded to Catholicos Mashtots I, who was a friend of Ashot (the cross has since been lost). Ashot also supported the Armenian Church's desire to separate from the Church of Caucasian Albania. Ashot donated several treasures to the Armenian Catholicos to distribute to the churches.

== The Question of the Date of Ashot Bagratuni's Accession to the Throne and the Years of His Reign in Historiography ==
The question of the date of Ashot Bagratuni's accession to the throne and the years of his reign has been examined by many researchers, who have proposed various, sometimes contradictory, datings. This issue has given rise to a kind of "debate" in historiography that remains unresolved to this day.

=== Views on the Date of Coronation ===
Among historians and researchers, the date of Ashot I's coronation varies from 884 to 887․

- 884– According to the memoirs of Grigor Mashkevor, Ashot was anointed King of Armenia on August 26, 884. This information is accepted as a basis by a number of researchers․
- 885 – This is the date of the sending of the crown to Ashot by Caliph Mutamid. A number of historians (Kirakos Gandzaketsi, Mkhitar Ayriyanetsi, Stepanos Orbelian) consider the Armenian year 334 (885/886) as the beginning of Ashot's reign․
- 886 – N. Adonts, A. Hovhannisyan, A. Kazhdan and K. Yuzbashyan consider 886 as the most likely year of Ashot Bagratuni's accession to the throne.
- 887 – Asoghik, Tovma Artsruni, Samvel Anetsi, Vardan Vardapet and Movses Daskhurantsi consider 887/888 as the beginning of Ashot's reign.

=== Number of Years of Reign ===
- In primary sources, the reign of Ashot I is attributed as 4, 5, or 7 years.
- 4 years – the testimony of the contemporary historian Tovma Artsruni.
- 5 years – reports by Asoghik, Samvel Anetsi, Kirakos Gandzaketsi, and others.
- 7 years– information preserved in annals and minor chronicles.

=== Positions of researchers ===
Arman Yeghiazaryan, in his work “Ashot I Bagratuni: King of Armenia”, examined in detail the information from all the primary sources and came to the conclusion that Ashot Bagratuni reigned from 887 to 891. He distinguishes three stages of the coronation: a silent coronation in 884, the approval of Byzantium in 886, and official recognition in 887.

V. Hakobyan notes that Ashot Bagratuni had become the de facto master and ruler of the country since 862, when he was proclaimed the prince of princes[74]. It is no coincidence that several historians count 434 years from the abolition of the Arshakunya kingdom to the restoration of the Bagratuni kingdom, again considering 862 as the year of the restoration of the kingdom.

N. Adonts, based on the information of Tovma Artsruni, dates the reign of Ashot I to 886-890. J. Saint-Martin, A. Hovhannisyan, A. Kazhdan and K. Yuzbashyan also believe that 886 is more likely.

Leon, G. Ostrogorsky and others consider the beginning of Ashot's reign to be 887. Samvel Anetsi clearly states that Ashot "richly crowned the royal crown" with crowns received from both empires.

In summary, the issue of the coronation date and years of reign of Ashot I continues to be a subject of discussion in historiography, due to both the contradictory information in the primary sources and the fact that the coronation took place in several stages: receiving the crown from the caliph, the consent of Byzantium, and the official coronation ceremony․

== Family ==
Ashot the Great; Prince of Princes, sparapet (855–885) king of Armenia (885–890)	Katranide I Queen of Armenia (885–890)
Smbat king of Armenia (890–914)	Sahak	David (†902)	Shapuh sparapet (†912)
Sofya	Grigor-Derenik prince of Vaspurakan (857–887)	daughter	Vahan Artsruni	Mariam (†914)	Vasak Syuni prince of Syunik (855–859)
Ashot prince of Vaspurakan (898–904)	Gagik prince and king of Vaspurakan (904–908) / (908–943)	Gurgen prince of Parskahayk (904–925)	Grigor prince of Syunik (855–859) (859–913)	Sahak	Vasak
Ashot the Iron king of Armenia (914–928)	Sahakanuysh Sevada	Abas king of Armenia (928–953)	Gurgendukht Bagratuni	Seda	son	Ashot

== Notes ==
Preceded by Smbat VIII Bagratuni	Sparapet of Armenia; 855–884	Establishment of the Bagratid Kingdom of Armenia
Vacant Suspended due to Armenian rebellion Title last held by Bagrat II Bagratuni	Prince of princes of Armenia under Abbasid suzerainty 862–884	Establishment of the Bagratid Kingdom of Armenia
New title	King of Bagratid Armenia; 884–890	Succeeded by Smbat I
