= Bagha al-Kabir's campaign against Najd (842–848) =

Bagha al-Kabirs campaign against Najd 842–848
Date	842–848 AD
Location	Najd, modern day Saudi Arabia
Result	Abbasid victory

Belligerents
Abbasid Caliphate	Banu Sulaym; Banu Numayr and other Arab Tribes

Commanders and leaders
Bugha al-Kabir	Arab Tribal Leaders

Casualties and losses
Unknown	High

Bagha al-Kabirs Campaign against Najd was a campaign led by al-Mutawakkil and Bugha al-Kabir against the tribes of Najd, as they had revolted against the Abbasid Authority.

== The Campaign ==
Between 842 and 848, Bugha al-Kabir had led multiple expeditions to put down the Tribal Arab revolts across Najd, recorded by Muslim Scholar al-Tabari, he faced multiple Arab tribes such as Banu Sulaym, and later Banu Numayr, as he had suppressed the revolts, defeating them in multiple engagements.

The Campaign had restored Abbasid authority over Najd's tribes, as they had regained vital routes and trade.
