= Ishaq ibn Muslim al-Uqayli =

8th-century Umayyad general and governor

- Military career
- Allegiance: Umayyad Caliphate; Abbasid Caliphate
- Service years: c. 738 – after 750
- Wars: Arab–Khazar wars, Third Fitna, Abbasid Revolution

Ishaq ibn Muslim ibn Rabi'a ibn Asim al-Uqayli was a general and governor for the Umayyad Caliphate in the region of Arminiya (Transcaucasia), and a close supporter of the last Umayyad caliph, Marwan II. Following the defeat of Marwan by the Abbasid Revolution, he initially resisted but finally came to terms with the Abbasids.

== Origins ==
Ishaq's grandfather Rabi'a ibn Asim was a Basran who had fought and died in the Battle of the Camel in 656, after which the family moved to the Jazira. Ishaq's father Muslim fought alongside the Qaysi chief Zufar ibn al-Harith al-Kilabi during his rebellion against the Umayyads from the fortified Jaziran town of Qarqisiya in 684–691. He played a key role in the Qaysi feud with the pro-Umayyad Taghlib tribe in 689, pushing the tribe to flee their camp near Mosul into a rout by Zufar when they reached the Tigris River.

== Military career ==
Along with his brothers, Abd al-Malik and Isa, Ishaq was one of the commanders of Marwan ibn Muhammad (the future Marwan II) during the latter's governorship in Armenia and Adharbayjan and his campaigns against the Khazars. Thus in 738 he defeated the Caucasian prince Tuman Shah and captured his strongholds. In 743/744, he was appointed as commander of Derbent (Bab al-Abwab) and governor of the combined province of Armenia and Adharbayjan, and he accompanied Marwan in 745/746 in the fighting in the Jazira, during the Third Fitna. He then returned to his governorship in Armenia, which he seems to have kept until the end of the Umayyad Caliphate in 749/750.

At that time, following the defeat of Marwan at the hands of the armies of the Abbasid Revolution, he assembled the remnants of the Umayyad armies and rallied Marwan's supporters in Armenia and the Jazira (the areas which had been Marwan's personal power base) and established himself with reportedly 60,000 men at the fortress of Sumaysat, awaiting the Abbasid advance. In the event, a negotiated settlement was reached between Ishaq and Abu Ja'far (the future Caliph al-Mansur), and many of the pro-Umayyad leaders became accepted in the ranks of the Abbasids. Thus Ishaq himself became one of the most influential members of al-Mansur's council, and even his brother Bakkar, who participated in the rebellion of Abd Allah ibn Ali in 754, was pardoned again and rehabilitated, going on to govern Arminiya under al-Mansur.

== Sources ==
- Blankinship, Khalid Yahya (1994). The End of the Jihâd State: The Reign of Hishām ibn ʻAbd al-Malik and the Collapse of the Umayyads. Albany, New York: State University of New York Press. ISBN 978-0-7914-1827-7.
- Crone, Patricia (1980). Slaves on Horses: The Evolution of the Islamic Polity (1980 ed.). Cambridge: Cambridge University Press. ISBN 978-0521229616.
- Dixon, 'Abd al-Ameer 'Abd (August 1969). The Umayyad Caliphate 65–86/684–705: A Political Study (Thesis). University of London, School of Oriental and African Studies.
- Kennedy, Hugh N. (1986). The Early Abbasid Caliphate: A Political History. London and Sydney: Croom Helm. ISBN 0-7099-3115-8.
