= Zacharias I of Armenia =

Catholicos Zacharias I of Armenia was the Catholicos of the Armenian Apostolic Church between 855 and 876. During his reign a severe earthquake rocked Dvin, during which Zacharias offered powerful prayers. It is said his prayers protected Dvin's church from damage. Zacharias was one of the main supporters of the Council of Shirakavan, in which he participated, and which was a council seeking unity with the Eastern Orthodox Church. Prior to convening the council, he exchanged cordial letters with Photios I of Constantinople.

He died in the twenty-second year of his rule and was buried in Dvin's "cemetery of the holy fathers".

| Preceded by John IV of Armenia | Catholicos of the Holy See of St. Echmiadzin and All Armenians; 855–876 | Succeeded by George II of Armenia |
