= Yusuf ibn Muhammad ibn Yusuf al-Marwazi =

Yusuf ibn Muhammad ibn Yusuf al-Marwazi (Arabic: يوسف بن محمد بن يوسف المروزي) was a ninth-century governor of Adharbayjan and Arminiyah for the Abbasid Caliphate, serving there from 851 until early 852, when he was killed during an Armenian revolt.

== Career ==
Yusuf was the son of Abu Sa'id Muhammad ibn Yusuf al-Marwazi, a Khurasani army commander. Following Muhammad's death in June 851, the caliph al-Mutawakkil assigned Yusuf his father's offices as head of security and governor of Adharbayjan and Arminiyah. Yusuf accordingly set out for Arminiyah and dispatched his administrative officials throughout the province.

Upon his arrival in Arminiyah, Yusuf was forced to deal with the rebellion of the Armenian prince Bagrat II Bagratuni, who sought to gain control of the country. He was able to neutralize Bagrat by seizing and sending him to the caliph in Samarra, but this act greatly angered the Armenian patrikioi who swore to kill him in retaliation. The patrikioi proceeded to wipe out the garrisons that Yusuf had stationed in the rural districts of the province; they also sent encouragement and aid to the mountain dwellers of Sasun for them to attack the governor.

In late February or March 852, the Armenians caught up to Yusuf at Mush in Tarun following a heavy snowfall and surrounded the town. Following a siege lasting several days, Yusuf went to the town gate and fought against the rebels, but was killed along with all of those at his side. The Armenians then plundered his camp, while the noncombatants were ordered strip naked and set out in the snow; most of these soon died from the cold or lost their fingers to frostbite.

In response to the death of Yusuf, al-Mutawakkil dispatched Bugha al-Kabir to Arminiyah, who defeated the rebels and reestablished caliphal control over the province.

== Notes ==
Preceded by Abu Sa'id Muhammad ibn Yusuf al-Marwazi	Governor of Arminiyah; 851–852	Succeeded by Bugha al-Kabir
