= Arzanene =

Historical region in Armenia

Coordinates: 38.0000°N 41.6833°E

Map of the provinces of the Kingdom of Armenia in 150, including Arzanene (Aghdznik)

Arzanene (Greek: Ἀρζανηνή) or Aghdznik (Armenian: Աղձնիք, romanized: Ałjnikʻ) was a historical region in the southwest of the ancient kingdom of Armenia. It was ruled by one of the four bdeashkhs (bidakhsh, vitaxa) of Armenia, the highest ranking nobles below the king who ruled over the kingdom's border regions. Its probable capital was the fortress-city of Arzen. The region briefly became home to the capital of Armenia during the reign of Tigranes the Great, who built his namesake city Tigranocerta there. Arzanene was placed under the direct suzerainty of the Roman Empire after the Peace of Nisibis in 298. It was briefly brought back under Armenian control c. 371 but was soon lost again following the partition of Armenia in 387.

== Name ==
It is generally agreed the Greco-Roman name of Arzanene is derived from the city of Arzan (Arzn or Aghzn in Armenian), which was probably the capital of the province. The name is identified with the Alzi or Alše mentioned in Neo-Assyrian and Urartian inscriptions and is of non-Armenian origin.

== Geography ==
Arzanene was located between the western Tigris and the eastern Taurus Mountains, covering an area of approximately 15,102 km^{2} (6,000 sq mi). (Note: Yeremian gives the larger figure 17,532 sq. km. as the approximate area of the Aghdznik, as he includes the canton of Angeghtun within the province.) It was located to the east of the Batman River and to the west of the Botan River (both tributaries of the Tigris). The region was naturally divided between the mountainous part closer to the Taurus in the north, which had an extremely cold climate, and the flat part to the south, which had a warm and dry climate. Arzanene was famous for its rivers and springs, as well as its iron and lead mines. Cattle-breeding, grape cultivation and winemaking were well developed in the province. The province had about seven fortresses.

According the early medieval Armenian geography Ashkharhats’oyts’, Arzanene was divided into ten cantons or gawars (their capitals or main fortresses, where known, are listed adjacent to the canton name):

- Np’rkert: Np’rkert (later Martyropolis) (Note: According to Hewsen, the canton of Np’rkert may have been included in Arzanene only after Byzantine administrative reorganization after 591; before this Np’rkert was a part of Mets Tsop’k’/Sophanene.)
- Aghdzn: Arzan
- Kēt’ik
- Tatik
- K’agh: K’ghimar
- Aznuadzor
- Erkhet’k’
- Gzeghkh: Gzeghkh
- Salnoy Dzor: Salnodzor
- Sanasunk’ (Sasun): Sanasun

One of the recensions of Ashkharhats’oyts’ includes an eleventh district, Saghu, which is likely an error. Historian Suren Yeremian includes Angeghtun among the cantons of Aghdznik’, even though it is not listed as such in any of the manuscripts of Ashkharhats’oyts’ (Cyril Toumanoff and Robert Hewsen consider Angeghtun to have been a part of Tsop’k’/Sophene).

As the domain of one of the four bdeashkhs of Armenia, Arzanene can be divided into the core principality or "Arzanene proper" and the bdeshkhut’iwn (viceroyalty or march) of Arzanene, which likely included all of the ten cantons of Arzanene listed above (according to Hewsen, probably excluding Np’rkert) and some further territories to the south. Josef Markwart and Toumanoff include the adjacent provinces of Moxoene (Mokk’) and Corduene (or part of it) in the viceroyalty of Arzanene, although this is rejected by Hewsen. The viceroyalty of Arzanene is also called the bdeshkhut’iwn of Aruastan in some Armenian sources (Persian: Arabistān, referring in this case to the area around Nisibis), so it is referred to as the Arabian March by some historians.

== History ==
In the first half of the first millennium BCE, Arzanene may have been the location of the state of Alzi or Alše mentioned in Assyrian and Urartian cuneiform inscriptions. It was conquered by the Kingdom of Urartu (c. 9th–6th centuries BCE), then came under the control of the Medes and soon after passed to the Achaemenid Empire. Under Achaemenid rule, Arzanene was included in the Satrapy of Armenia. The Persian Royal Road passed through the province. After the conquest of the Achaemenid Empire by Alexander the Great in 330 BCE, Arzanene became a part of the Armenian kingdom ruled by the Orontid dynasty. The local princes of Arzanene claimed Assyrian royal origin, but in all likelihood they were originally a branch of the Orontid dynasty. During the reign of Tigranes the Great, under whom Armenia reached its greatest territorial extent, Arzanene became the center of his short-lived empire as the location of the new capital of Tigranocerta. It was probably under Tigranes that the bdeshkhut’iwn of Arzanene was established to defend Armenia from an invasion from Mesopotamia. The office of the bdeashkh of Arzanene continued to exist under the Arsacid dynasty of Armenia and after the region was lost by Armenia, until at least the mid-5th century.

In 298 AD, the entire bdeshkhut’iwn of Arzanene came under the suzerainty of the Roman Empire as a result of the Peace of Nisibis. However, the 5th-century Armenian historian Faustus of Byzantium (Book 3, Chapter 8) still speaks of the bdeashkh of Arzanene as a vassal of the king of Armenia in the 330s, which Toumanoff accepts as evidence that the Romans had effectively left Arzanene under Armenian suzerainty. In the 330s, bdeashkh Bakur of Arzanene attempted to defect to the Sasanian Empire, but was killed in battle and the province consequently remained under Roman (or Roman-Armenian) control. The emperor Jovian was forced to give up suzerainty over Arzanene to the Persians according to the peace treaty signed in 363 after Julian's failed Persian expedition. Faustus of Byzantium (Book 5, Chapter 16) names Arzanene among the provinces reconquered for Armenia by Mushegh Mamikonian c. 371, during the reign of King Pap. After the Peace of Acilisene of 387, Arzanene was divided between Rome and the Sasanian Empire (with most of it going to the Persians), and until 591 the Roman-Sasanian border passed through the western part of the province. During the Armenian rebellion of 450–451 against the Sasanian Empire, the Armenian rebels appealed to the bdeashkh of Arzanene as a foreign ruler; this is the last time that any bdeashkh of Arzanene is mentioned in the classical sources. By 591, all of Arzanene had been annexed by the Byzantine Empire. On the ruins of Tigranocerta, the Romans built a new city named Martyropolis or Np’rkert. In c. 640, the Arab general Iyad ibn Ghanm invaded Arzanene from Syria. Following the Arab conquest of Armenia, many Arab tribes settled in Arzanene, especially in the lowlands. The Armenian population remained in the mountainous parts of the region until the Armenian genocide in 1915.

Arzanene was later a small Arab emirate under the Zurarid dynasty in the 9th century. In the 10th century the area fell under Hamdanid control. Hamdum, an Arab chief, conquered Arzanene and Amid around 962. In 963 a sister of Hamdum, whose name is not given in the original sources, governed the region for ten years. After 1045 it fell successively under Byzantine, Seljuk, Mongol and Ottoman Turkish control. For many years the Armenians of Sasun maintained a semi-independent status and fought the Ottoman authorities; well known battles are the Sasun Resistance (1894) and Sasun resistance in 1915.

== Population ==
The exact ethnic composition of Arzanene is not known. According to Nicholas Adontz, its population was mixed "Armeno-Syrian." Pliny the Elder refers to a people called the Azoni, which Robert Hewsen believes to be a misspelling of *Arzoni, apparently referring to the people of Arzanene as if forming a distinct ethnic group. In Hewsen's view, Armenians must have settled in Arzanene early on but "it is likely that the basic population had remained essentially semitic-speaking." Under Arab rule Arzanene became heavily settled by Arab and Kurdish tribes, but a significant Armenian element (according to one source, an absolute majority of Armenians) remained there until the Armenian genocide.

== See also ==
- List of regions of ancient Armenia
- Bidaxsh
