= Bugha al-Kabir =

General in the Abbasid Turkic regiment

- Bugha al-Kabir بُغا الكبير
- Born: c. 770
- Died: August 862; Samarra
- Children: Musa ibn Bugha al-Kabir
- Military career
- Allegiance: Abbasid Caliphate
- Branch: Abbasid Turkic regiment
- Service years: c. 830 – 862
- Conflicts: Sack of Amorium, Babak Khorramdin Revolt; Bagha al-Kabir's campaign against Najd (842-848); Armenian Revolt (850–855)

Bugha al-Kabir (Arabic: بُغا الكبير, lit. 'Bugha the Greater/Elder'), also known as Bugha al-Turki (Arabic: بُغا التركي, lit. 'Bugha the Turk'), was a 9th-century Khazar general who served the Abbasid Caliphate.

== Biography ==
He was of Khazar origin, and was acquired along with his sons as a military slave (ghulam) by al-Mu'tasim in 819/820. He is first mentioned in 825, and then again in 835, when he led reinforcements in the fight against the Khurramite rebels of Babak Khorramdin. Bugha also participated in Mu'tasim's Amorium campaign in 838, where he led the rearguard, and later served as the Caliph's chamberlain. In 844/845, he suppressed a revolt of the Bedouin tribes of central Arabia.

Next he played an important role in crushing the Armenian revolt of 850–855: in 852 he was entrusted by the Caliph al-Mutawakkil with its suppression. Setting out from his base at Diyar Bakr, he first focused on the southern half of Armenia, i.e. the regions of Vaspurakan and Lake Van, before moving north to Dvin, Iberia and Albania. During these campaigns, he also defeated the renegade Emir of Tiflis, Ishaq ibn Isma'il, and sacked and burned Tiflis. By the end of 853, he had subdued the country and made many Caucasian magnates and princes (the eristavi and nakharar) captive, including Grigor-Derenik Artsruni, his uncle Gurgen and his father Ashot I, all sent to caliphal capital of Samarra.

Bugha was dispatched to the frontier (thughur) against the Byzantine Empire in 857/8, where he distinguished himself and where he remained for the next few years. He was thus absent from Samarra at the time of Mutawwakil's assassination, but returned immediately upon hearing of it. Following the death of Mutawwakil's heir, al-Muntasir, a few months later, Bugha and the other Turkic commanders of the Abbasid army selected al-Musta'in as his successor (see the "Anarchy at Samarra"). Bugha died a few months later, in August 862, reportedly at an age of "over 90 [lunar] years". His son Musa, and his sons in turn, rose to the senior court and military offices in Samarra during the late 9th century.

== Sources ==
- Golden, Peter (2005). Хазары, евреи и славяне [Khazars, Jews and Slavey] (in Russian). Jerusalem and Moscow: Gesharim. ISBN 5-93273-196-6.
- Gordon, Matthew S. (2001). The Breaking of a Thousand Swords: A History of the Turkish Military of Samarra (A.H. 200–275/815–889 C.E.). Albany, New York: State University of New York Press. ISBN 0-7914-4795-2.
- Hovannisian, Richard G. (2004). The Armenian People From Ancient to Modern Times, Volume I: The Dynastic Periods: From Antiquity to the Fourteenth Century. Palgrave Macmillan. ISBN 1-4039-6636-2.
- Kennedy, Hugh (2001). The Armies of the Caliphs: Military and Society in the Early Islamic State. London and New York: Routledge. ISBN 0-415-25093-5.
- Pipes, Daniel (1981). Slave Soldiers and Islam: The Genesis of a Military System. Yale University Press. ISBN 0-300-02447-9.
- Sourdel, D. (1960). "Bughā al-Kabīr". In Gibb, H. A. R.; Kramers, J. H.; Lévi-Provençal, E.; Schacht, J.; Lewis, B. & Pellat, Ch. (eds.). The Encyclopaedia of Islam, Second Edition. Volume I: A–B. Leiden: E. J. Brill. p. 1287. OCLC 495469456.
- Ter-Ghewondyan, Aram (1976) [1965]. The Arab Emirates in Bagratid Armenia. Translated by Garsoïan, Nina. Lisbon: Livraria Bertrand.
