= Nina Garsoïan =

American historian (1923–2022)

Nina Garsoïan FBA
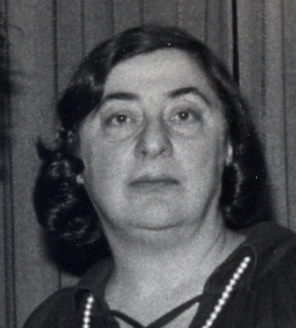
- Born: April 11, 1923; Paris, France
- Died: August 14, 2022 (aged 99); New York City, U.S.
- Education: Bryn Mawr College (BA); Columbia University (MA, PhD)
- Scientific career
- Fields: Armenian history, Byzantine history
- Workplaces: Princeton University; Columbia University; Smith College

Dean of Princeton University Graduate School
- In office 1977–1979
- Preceded by: Alvin Kernan
- Succeeded by: Theodore Ziolkowski

Nina G. Garsoïan FBA (April 11, 1923 – August 14, 2022) was a French-born American historian specializing in Armenian and Byzantine history. In 1969 she became the first female historian to get tenure at Columbia University and, subsequently, became the first holder of Gevork M. Avedissian Chair in Armenian History and Civilization at Columbia. From 1977 to 1979, she served as dean of the Graduate School of Princeton University.

== Biography ==
Nina G. Garsoïan was born in Paris on April 11, 1923, to Armenian parents from Nakhichevan-on-Don (Rostov-on-Don) and Tbilisi. She moved to New York in 1933. She received a Bachelor of Arts in classical archaeology from Bryn Mawr College in 1943 and both Master of Arts degree and PhD from Columbia University in Byzantine, Near Eastern, and Armenian history. She received Fulbright Fellowship to study at the Mekhitarist monastery of San Lazzaro degli Armeni on San Lazzaro Island in Venice.

Garsoïan began teaching at Smith College in 1956 and Columbia in 1962. In 1969 she became the first female professor to receive tenure at Columbia's Department of History. Garsoïan became the first female dean of the Princeton University Graduate School when she was appointed to the position in 1977. She served in that position until 1979.

In 1979, she became the first holder of Gevork M. Avedissian Chair in Armenian History and Civilization at Columbia University. She retired in 1993 and was subsequently professor emerita of Armenian History and Civilization.

Garsoïan was the director of the Paris-based Revue des Études Arméniennes and a Fellow of the Medieval Academy of America and a Corresponding Fellow of the British Academy. She participated in a Byzantine Studies Symposium at Dumbarton Oaks, twice serving as a co-director.

Garsoïan died on August 14, 2022, at the age of 99.

== Publications ==
Garsoïan published numerous books and journal and encyclopedia articles on Armenian, Byzantine, and Sasanian history. In her publications she emphasized the Iranian/Persian influence on Armenian history.

Books

- The Paulician Heresy: a study of the origin and development of Paulicianism in Armenia and the eastern provinces of the Byzantine empire. Mouton, 1968.
- Armenia between Byzantium and the Sasanians. Variorum Publishing. 1985.
- The epic histories attributed to P'awstos Buzand: (Buzandaran Patmut'iwnk'). 1989.
- L'Église arménienne et le grand schisme d'Orient. Peeters Publishers. 1999.
- Church and Culture in Early Medieval Armenia. Ashgate Publishing, 1999.
- De Vita Sua. Mazda Publishers, 2011. (memoir)
- Studies on the Formation of Christian Armenia. 2010.
- Interregnum: Introduction to a Study on the Formation of Armenian Identity (ca 600-750). 2012.

Articles

- "Byzantine Heresy. A Reinterpretation." Dumbarton Oaks Papers 25 (1971): 85–113.
- "Secular jurisdiction over the Armenian church (fourth-seventh centuries)." Harvard Ukrainian Studies 7 (1983): 220–250.
- "Byzantium and the Sasanians." Cambridge History of Iran 3.1 (1983): 568–592.
- "The problem of Armenian integration into the Byzantine empire." Studies on the internal diaspora of the Byzantine Empire (1998): 53–124.

Translations

- The trade and cities of Armenia in relation to ancient world trade by Hakob Manandian. 1965
- Armenia in the Period of Justinian by Nicholas Adontz. Calouste Gulbenkian Foundation. 1970.
- The Arab Emirates in Bagratid Armenia by Aram Ter-Ghevondyan. Livraria Bertrand. 1976
- The Epic Histories Attributed to Pʻawstos Buzand: (Buzandaran Patmutʻiwnkʻ). Harvard University Press, 1989.
