= Livraria Bertrand =

Portuguese book retailer

Bertrand Library
- Livraria Bertrand

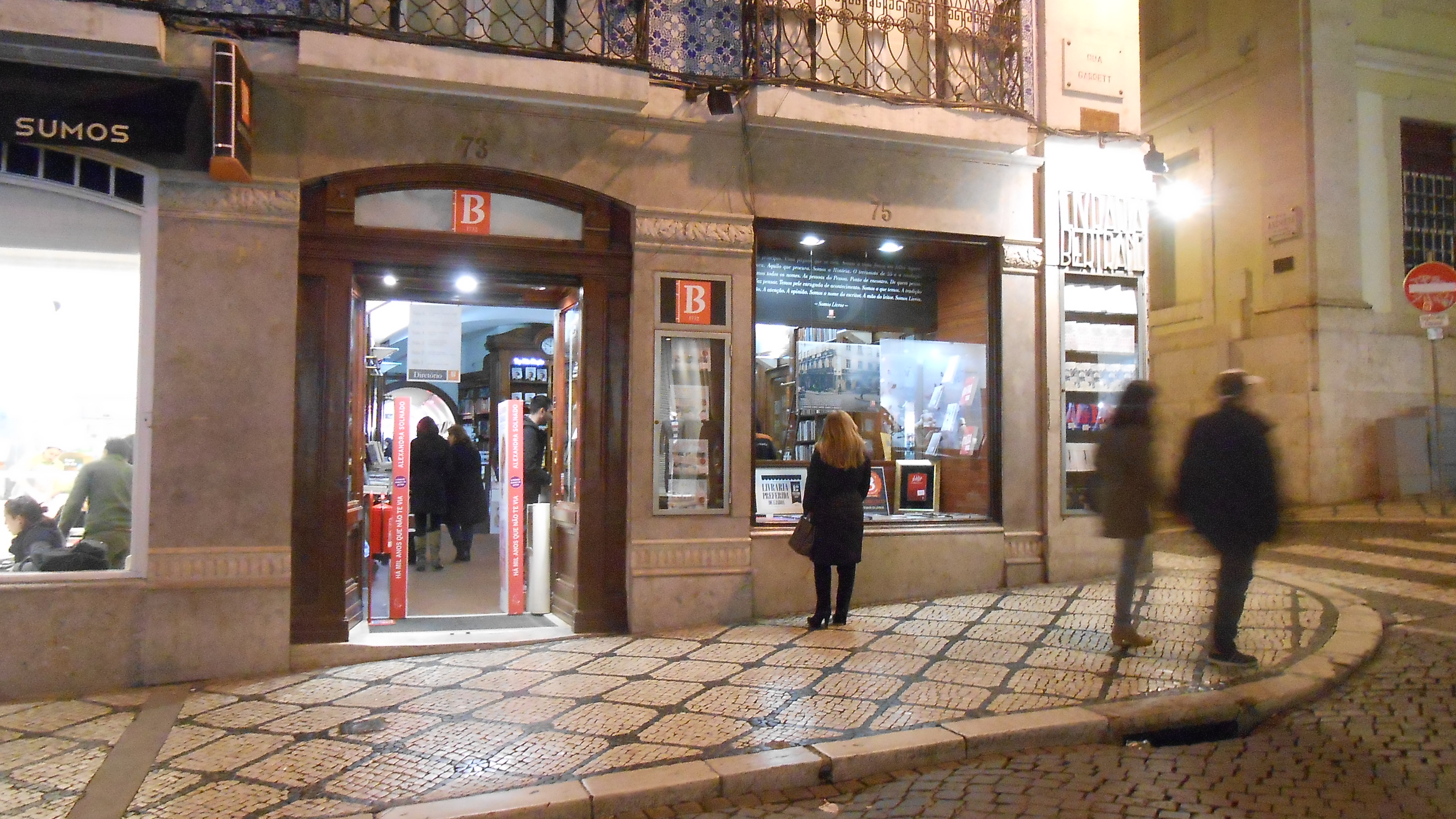
- Bertrand Library, in Chiado
- 38°42′38.30″N 9°8′28.10″W
- Location: Rua Garrett 73-75, Lisbon, Portugal
- Established: 1732
- Branches: 60

Other information
- Parent organization: BertrandCírculo Group
- Website: www.bertrand.pt

The Bertrand Library is a Portuguese book retailer operating 59 branches nationwide, including 2 in Madeira. Founded in 1732, its original store in the Chiado neighborhood of Lisbon was declared to be the oldest operating bookstore in the world by the Guinness Book of World Records in 2011. Bertrand has been frequented by numerous famous authors, including Alexandre Herculano, Fernando Pessoa, Eça de Queirós, Antero de Quental, Ramalho Ortigão, and the fictional protagonists of Antonio Tabucchi's short masterpiece "The Backwards Game".

== History ==
The history of the book and bookstores in Portugal is inseparable from that of the French. From the eighteenth century, there was the arrival of a large number of French booksellers to Portugal, including Pedro Faure, who went on to found what we know today as "Livraria Bertrand". Lisbon then had the presence of several compatriots of Pedro Faure, who were developing activities in the same industry, it seems, creating a tradition of printers and booksellers of French origin in Portugal. Pedro Faure, who already in 1727 was a leading printed shop in Cordoaria Velha, opened a bookstore in 1732, probably with his name on Rua Direita do Loreto, close to the current Livraria Bertrand do Chiado.

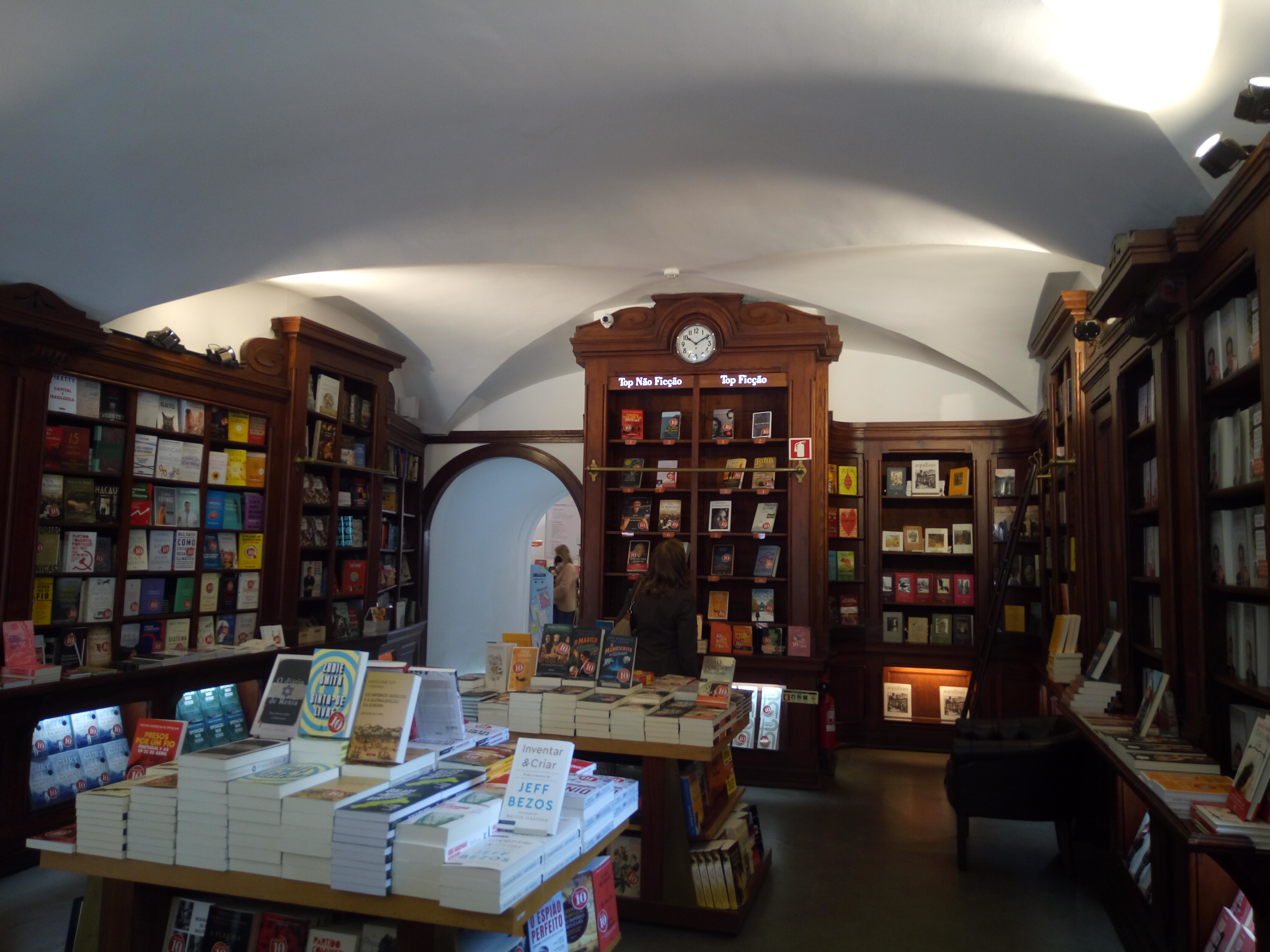
Inside the Livraria Bertrand in Chiado, Lisbon

In 1742, a new associate would be Pierre Bertrand, a newcomer to Lisbon coming from the Alpine region of Le Monêtier-les-Bains. The property was designated "Pedro Faure & Bertrand," and in the meantime, to ensure the succession, Pedro Faure married his daughter to Pierre Bertrand. A few years passed before one of Pierre Bertrand's brother, Jean Joseph, reached Lisbon and joined the company. The bookstore thus came to be called "Peter Faure & Bertrand Brothers". On the death of Peter Faure, in 11, 1753, the Bertrand brothers were business tycoons, redesignating the venture as "Irmãos Bertrand (Bertrand Brothers)". The business was doing well, but the 1755 earthquake eventually devastated the bookstore. This incident endangered the business, which was to be abandoned by Pierre but Jean Joseph Bertrand, more persistent, did not give up. Facing the pressure they were forced to find another location, and settled in the Capela de Nossa Senhora das Necessidades in a place called "Senhor Jesus da Boa Morte".

However, eighteen years later, in 1773, he returned to the rebuilt Lisbon Baixa (Pombaline Lower Town area), leading to the rebirth of the Livraria Bertrand in Rua Garrett, where it remains until the present day. With the death of Jean Joseph, his wife Marie Claire Rey Bertrand and his son took over the bookstore destinations . The widow, an active woman who always helped in the management of the company, led the family business, invariably dressed in black silk. The firm now assumed the circumspect name "Bertrand's Widow and Son." In 1791, the library's catalog included 169 titles, but if sought, many other books were available in the store, not counting those who could order in various parts of the kingdom or from foreign countries. With the death of Marie Claire Rey Bertrand, her son George Bertrand succeeded, who having neither the talent nor his father's health, would die before turning 40. So with his disappearance, another widow would ascend to lead the fate of the firm in the early 1800s: Marianna Borel Bertrand.

Later, in the nineteenth century, three of the children of George and Marianna Borel Bertrand – John Joseph, Andrew and Francis Xavier – take charge of the bookstore and future publishing business. Close friends of Alexandre Herculano edited almost all of his work. Later in the twentieth century, the company evolved, changed owners several times and was endowed with, consequently, different legal personalities. In 1912, ownership of the "Livraria Bertrand" was with the firm 'Aillaud Bastos & Alves' editors in Paris, Lisbon and Rio de Janeiro. In 1938, it opened the first bookstore in Porto and, from 1939, Livraria Bertrand had its own printing press. In 1942, the French bookseller Didier Marcel acquired the majority stake in Bertrand and was under its umbrella – and the management of the French George Lucas (1948–1975) as an administrator-delegate – the firm saw its maximum development and apogee, becoming the largest distributor of foreign books and journals, opening bookstores nationwide and elevating the issue to a remarkable level.

In 1963, it opened a second store in Lisbon, in Avenida de Roma. This photograph dates from 1965, the year of the advertising campaign on "The Book and the War", whose posters can be seen in the window. This campaign, aimed to promote reading, celebrating both the end of the twentieth anniversary of World War II. The pioneering library always remained open in Chiado, providing a wide range of all types of books along its six successive halls. After the death of Marcel Didier, in 1969, Georges Lucas promoted the sale of his position to Portuguese financier Manuel Bullosa. Nothing has changed in conducting business, keeping the same managing director and the same enterprise policy. In 1993, Manuel Bullosa sold Bertrand to a financial company represented by José Sotomayor Matoso.

In 2006 it was bought by DirectGroup Bertelsmann, owner of the Círculo de Leitores.

In 2010 the publishing group Porto Editora acquired Livraria Bertrand, and the remaining business units that Direct Group held in Portugal, namely Bertrand Editora and Distribuidora de Livros Bertrand. In April 2010, the Livraria Bertrand won the Guinness World Record for "the oldest booksellers continuing in activity", having won for the Bertrand Chiado bookshop, the Guinness World Record for "the oldest bookstore in activity. Bookstore Bertrand is thus the name of a network with 53 bookstores across Portugal, and formally integrates the Porto Editora Group since June 30, 2010.

== Chronology ==
1732 – Pedro Faure opens the first bookstore on the corner of Rua Direita do Loreto and Rua do Norte in Lisbon. The bookstore probably carried his name.

1747 – Pedro Faure includes the brothers Bertrand - Pierre and Jean Joseph Bertrand in the operations. The bookstore gets called "Pedro Faure & Irmãos Bertrand" ("Pedro Faure & the Bertrand Brothers").

1753 – Pedro Faure dies. The bookstore gets called "Bertrand Brothers".

1773 – After the earthquake of 1755, the Library reappears in Rua Garrett.

1909 – Bertrand deploys its own workshops for printing and composition, located at 100, Rua da Alegria, and takes on the name of "Tipografia da Antiga Casa Bertrand".

1938 – A partnership agreement is signed between the Livraria Bertrand and the International Library of Porto (Livraria Internacional do Porto, headquartered at 43–46, Rua 31 de Janeiro), which marks the beginning of the network.

1963 – Livraria Bertrand opens a second store in Lisbon, at Avenida de Roma.

2006 – The Círculo de Leitores acquires the Bertrand Group, comprising Editora Bertrand, Distribuidora de Livros Bertrand and Livrarias Bertrand.

2007 – The integration of Bertrand Group and Círculo de Leitores Group under the common brand of DirectGroup Portugal.

2008 – Direct Group Portugal acquires Editora Pergaminho and strengthens its position in Portuguese publishing.

2010 – The Groupo Porto Editora acquires the Direct Group, constituted by Editora Bertrand, Distribuidora Bertrand, Livrarias Bertrand and Círculo de Leitores. With this acquisition, the BertrandCírculo Group gets formed.
