= Aram Ter-Ghevondyan =

Egyptian-born Armenian historian (1928–1988)

- Born: July 24, 1928; Cairo, Egypt
- Died: February 10, 1988 (aged 59); Yerevan, USSR
- Education: Yerevan State University
- Known for: The Arab Emirates in Bagratuni Armenia (1965); Armeniia i arabaskii khalifat (1977)
- Scientific career
- Fields: Armenian studies, Oriental studies
- Workplaces: Armenian Academy of Sciences
- Doctoral advisor: Joseph Orbeli

Aram Ter-Ghevondyan (Armenian: Արամ Նահապետի Տեր-Ղևոնդյան; Russian: Aрaм Наaпетович Теp-Гeвoндян, also often seen written in Western sources as Ter-Ghewondyan or Ter-Łewondyan; July 24, 1928 – February 10, 1988) was an Armenian historian and scholar who specialized in the study of historical sources and medieval Armenia's relations with the Islamic world and Oriental studies. His seminal work, The Arab Emirates in Bagratuni Armenia, is an important study on the Bagratuni Kingdom of Armenia. From 1981 until his death, Ter-Ghevondyan headed the Institute of Oriental Studies at the Armenian Academy of Sciences and he additionally held an honorary doctorate from the University of Aleppo and was an associate member of the Tiberian Academy of Rome.

== Life ==
=== Education ===
Ter-Ghevondyan was born in Cairo, Egypt to an Armenian family which had fled from the town of Marash in the Ottoman Empire during the massacres of the Armenian genocide. In the late 1940s, his family repatriated to Soviet Armenia, where he enrolled at Yerevan State University. Ter-Ghevondyan graduated from the with a degree in philology in Oriental languages in 1954. Pursuing higher studies, he was accepted to the Oriental Studies Department at Leningrad State University. There, he met the renowned Armenian scholars Hrachia Acharian and Joseph Orbeli. He was especially fond of the guidance and advice Orbeli provided him with, as he repeatedly remarked after he had completed his studies, "Once more, fortune had smiled upon me, [for] my adviser was Academician Hovsep [Joseph] Orbeli." He defended his dissertation, "The Emirate of Dvin from the Ninth to Eleventh Centuries," and was awarded his Candidate of Sciences in 1958.

=== Academic career ===
As a scholar who was fluent in Arabic, Ter-Ghevondyan had a profound interest in the history of the medieval Arab caliphates and emirates. From 1958 to 1981, he worked at the Institute of History at the Armenian Academy of Sciences (AAS) with a special emphasis in philology, historiography and the study of historical sources. His first significant work devoted to Bagratuni Armenia's relations with the Islamic world was The Arab Emirates in Bagratuni Armenia (Armenian: Արաբական Ամիրայությունները Բագրատունյաց Հայաստանում) and was published in 1965. The book was highly praised and found to be of such great importance that it was translated from Armenian into English by American Byzantine scholar Nina Garsoïan, and later into Arabic by Aleksan Keshishyan. Ter-Ghevondyan's doctoral work centered on the political and cultural links between Armenians and Arabs during the medieval era and he defended his dissertation once more and received his Doctor of Sciences in 1977. Titled Armenia and the Arab Caliphate, Ter-Ghevondyan's work was published by the AAS in the same year.

In 1981, thanks to Ter-Ghevondyan's efforts, the institute of Oriental Studies at the AAS was established and he was appointed to be the inaugural holder of the chair for the study of primary sources. He continued on with his research and in the same year, he completed the translation of the excerpts of the work of the 13th-century Arab chronicler Ibn al-Asir, as part of a series initiated by the AAS to translate historical sources about Armenia and Armenians from their original languages into Armenian. He translated from classical to modern Armenian, wrote the introductions and commentaries on, in 1982 and 1983 respectively, the works of Armenian historians Ghevond (History) and Agatangeghos (History of Armenia). In 1983, Ter-Ghevondyan became a professor at Yerevan State University and taught the courses "Ancient and Medieval History of the Arab World" and "An Introduction to Arabic Philology."

Due to his death in February 1988, many of Ter-Ghevondyan's works were left unpublished. His monograph, Armenia in 6th to 8th Centuries, was published posthumously in 1996. He was the author of over 100 articles and a regular contributor to the Arab-related entries in the Soviet Armenian Encyclopedia (1974–1987) and wrote numerous chapters in the second and third volumes of the History of the Armenian People (vol. 2, 1984; vol. 3, 1976).

== Published works ==
- (in Armenian) Arabakan amirayutyunnere Bagratunyats Hayastanum. Yerevan: Armenian Academy of Sciences, 1965.
  - The Arab emirates in Bagratid Armenia translated from armenian and edited by Nina G. Garsoïan. Lisbon: Calouste Gulbenkian Foundation, 1976
- (in French) "Chronologie de la ville de Dvin (Duin) aux 9e et 11e siècles," Revue des Études Arméniennes (1965).
- (in French) "Le Prince d’Arménie à l’époque de la domination arabe," Revue des Études Arméniennes 3 (1966).
- (in French) "La survivance de la division administrative Kust-i-Kapkoh sous le califat." Revue des Études Arméniennes. N.S. 5, 1968.
- (in Armenian) "Sasuni 749-752 tt. anhayt apstambutyune Khalifayutyan dem [The Obscure 749-752 Sasun Rebellion against the Caliphate] Patma-Banasirakan Handes 3 (1971).
- (in Russian) Armeniia i arabaskii khalifat [Armenia and the Arab Caliphate]. Yerevan: Armenian Academy of Sciences, 1977.
- (in French) L'Armenie et la conquete arabe," in Armenian Studies/Études Arméniennes in Memoriaum Haig Berbérian. Dickran Kouymjian (ed.) Lisbon: Calouste Gulbenkian Foundation, 1986.
- (in Armenian) Hodvatsneri zhoghovatsu [Collected Articles], ed. Vahan Ter-Ghevondyan. Yerevan: Yerevan State University Press, 2003.
- "The Armenian Rebellion of 703 Against the Caliphate" in The Legacy of Jihad: Islamic Holy War and the Fate of Non-Muslims. Andrew G. Bostom (ed.) New York: Prometheus Books and Rowman & Littlefield, 2005.
