= Hemshin =

Hemshin, Hemşin, or variants may refer to:

- Hemshin peoples, in Western Asia
- Hemshin language, or Homshetsi dialect, an Armenian dialect spoken by the eastern and northern group of Hemshin peoples
- Principality of Hamamshen, a medieval Armenian principality
- Hemşin District, Rize Province, Turkey; the historical homeland of the Hemshin peoples
  - Hemşin, also known as Hamshen or Hamamashen, a town in Hemşin District
  - Hemşin River
- Hemşin, Akçakoca, a village in Düzce Province, Turkey
