= Rüzgarlı, İkizdere =

Rüzgarlı Mize (Laz language)
- Village
- Location in Turkey
- Coordinates: 40°45′46″N 40°33′26″E
- Country: Turkey
- Province: Rize
- District: İkizdere
- Elevation: 960 m (3,150 ft)
- Population (2021): 117
- Time zone: UTC+3 (TRT)

Rüzgarlı is a village in the İkizdere District, Rize Province, in Black Sea Region of Turkey. Its population is 117 (2021). Turkish singer Tarkan is from this village.

== History ==
According to list of villages in Laz language book (2009), name of the village is Mize, which means "dark bird". Most of the villagers are ethnically Laz or Hemshin.

== Geography ==
The village is located 5 kilometres (3.1 mi) away from İkizdere.
