= Gökhan Birben =

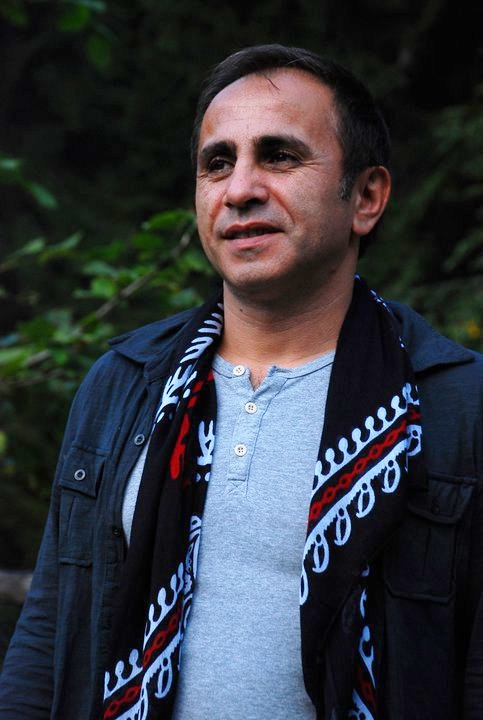

Background information
- Born: Rize, Turkey
- Genres: Folk, protest
- Occupation(s): Singer-songwriter, writer
- Instrument(s): Tulum, vocals
- Website: www.gokhanbirben.com.tr//

Gökhan Birben is a Turkish singer and artist of Hamsheni descent.

Birben attended school in Rize until graduating from high school. After graduating at the age of 17, he ended up in Istanbul where he attended the Istanbul University State Conservatory. Upon joining the Kadıköy Moda Musical Association, he began training in Turkish classical music, but Birben is yet to adapt this style of music. He became interested in football and played for two years as a member of the Fenerbahçe youth team. He has also worked as a radio reporter.

Birben released his first album in 2003, Hey Gidi Karadeniz. The language of the songs are Homshetsi and Laz.

== Albums ==
Hey Gidi Karadeniz (26 March 2003)

1. Hey Gidi Karadeniz
2. Oy Oy Güzelum
3. Liligum (Sevdiğim)
4. İzgali-na (Gittin)
5. Havaz Ali Mevalezt (Hava Yine Bulutlandı)
6. Atma türkü
7. Khacivanag
8. Dumanlı Dağlar
9. Akar Hemşin Deresi
10. Gidiyorum Yayladan
11. Kar Yağar Karamişa
12. Yüreğim Senilendur

Asa Sevdam (11 May 2005)

1. Karadeniz Karasun
2. Yüksek Dağlara Kar Var
3. Tulumci
4. Alacalı kuş
5. Asiye
6. Derrule
7. Oy Dağlarum
8. Divane Aşık Gibi
9. Haba
10. Asa Sevdam
11. Sis Dağı
12. Dere Beni Boğamaz
13. Haso Cernozutes

Bir Türkü Ömrüme (20 December 2006)

1. Bir Türkü Ömrüme
2. Oy Puşilim
3. Heyya Heyya
4. Ey Mustafa
5. Osmanum
6. Kız Hamsiye
7. Nazlı Yar
8. Hele Mele
9. Nani Nani
10. Tun Sari Mazed Sari
11. Ahmedum

Bulutların Gözyaşı (7 July 2011)

1. Samistal
2. Üskürt Dağı
3. Bulutların Gözyaşı
4. Omuzumda Orağum
5. Karayemiş
6. Vaketisa Düzebi
7. Analigum
8. Hey Gidi Karli Dağlar
9. Punipos
10. Zurpicine Ağhçkenin
11. Ağustozi Mulun
12. Verane Kalsun Dağlar
