= Cemil Aksu =

Turkish activist (born 1977)

- Born: January 29, 1977 (age 49); Hopa, Artvin Province, Turkey
- Education: Anadolu University; Istanbul Bilgi University
- Occupation: journalist
- Known for: Hemshin cultural activism

Cemil Aksu (Armenian: Ջեմիլ Աքսու, Turkish: Cemil Aksu, born 29 January 1977) is a Turkish Armenian journalist, political and social activist, local historian, ecologist and critic. He is co-chairman of the Peoples' Democratic Party in Hopa.

== Life and career ==
Aksu was born in the city of Hopa in Artvin Province, Turkey, into a Hemshin Armenian family.

He was arrested in 1996 for political reasons. He started a degree in public administration at Anadolu University after his release from prison in 2004. He received a master's degree in philosophy from Istanbul Bilgi University.

From 2008 to 2011, he was editor of the bilingual Homshetsi–Turkish journal Biryaşam, dedicated to Hopa's history, geography and culture.

He became a member of the editorial board of the Hemshin cultural journal "GOR", and contributed to its first issue in 2014.

A critic of Recep Tayyip Erdoğan's rule in Turkey, Aksu was arrested by the Turkish police in the city of Artvin in October 2017 on the charge of "glorifying crime and criminals" in his social media posts. His wife Nurcan Vayiç Aksu, human rights activist and member of the Socialist Party of the Oppressed (ESP), had been detained in a police raid the day before. They were both released from custody on 8 December 2017.

He has been active in the Pollen Ecology Collective (Polen Ekoloji Kolektifi), an organisation affiliated with the ESP, and suffered arrest during a nationwide crackdown on the party by the Turkish authorities in February 2026.

In 2026, he became a regular contributor to the Turkish left-wing daily Politika, in which he published his rebuttal of the development economics perspective in Alfredo Saad-Filho's work.

== Family ==
Aksu is married to Nurcan Vayiç Aksu, with whom he has a son, Arev.

== Publications ==
- "Karadeniz'in Sol Köşesi: Hopa (Siyasetin Yerelleşmesi Bağlamında Bir Okuma)", in Karardı Karadeniz, ed. Uğur Biryol, İstanbul: İletişim Yayınları, 2012, pp. 231–288, ISBN 9789750510700.
- Sudan Sebepler. Türkiye'de Neoliberal Su-Enerji Politikaları ve Direnişler (edited, with Sinan Erensü and Erdem Evren), İstanbul: İletişim Yayınları, 2016, ISBN 9789750519888.
- "Kimlikler, Çıkarlar, Siyasetler: Karadeniz Siyasetine Hopa'dan Bakmak" (with Meryem Özçep), in Değişen Karadeniz'i Anlamak, ed. Deniz Yıldırım ve Evren Haspolat, Ankara: Phoenix Yayınları, 2016, pp. 97–125, ISBN 9786059801256.
- Ekoloji Almanağı 2005-2016 (edited, with Ramazan Korkut), İstanbul: Yeni İnsan Yayınevi, 2017, ISBN 9789752498419.
