= Bayırköy, İkizdere =

Bayırköy Kolyav
- Village
- Location in Turkey
- Coordinates: 40.7502°N 40.5872°E
- Country: Turkey
- Province: Rize
- District: İkizdere
- Elevation: 1,020 m (3,350 ft)
- Population (2021): 169
- Time zone: UTC+3 (TRT)

Bayırköy is a village in the İkizdere District, Rize Province, in Black Sea Region of Turkey. Its population is 169 (2021).

== History ==
The village population consists entirely of a single extended kin group, the Ekşioğlu family. All villagers are connected to each other through lineage ties within this family. The Ekşioğlu are of Turkish origin, belonging to the Bayındır branch of the Oghuz Turks. The founder of the village, Hacı İbrahim Ekşi, is buried next to the village mosque.

The village was founded in the late 18th century by Hacı İbrahim Ekşi and his relatives.

== Tombstone ==
The tombstone of Hacı İbrahim Ekşi (founder of Bayırköy, İkizdere, Rize) bears the following inscription in Ottoman Turkish:

"Bu dünyada bulmadim hiç rahati
Ihtiyar ettim ânin içün rihleti
Kimse gülmez, kimse dahi gülmeye
Zevkine degmez cihanin mihneti
Merhum ve magfur Eksizade E1-Hac Ibrahim Aga ruhuna
Fatiha, fî 10 Muharrem sene 1200"

  - English translation:**

"I have found no comfort in this world; therefore, I chose to depart. No one laughs, nor can anyone enjoy laughing; the hardships of the world are not worth it. To the soul of the late and forgiven Eksizade Hacı İbrahim Ağa: Fatiha. 10 Muharrem 1200 (Hijri calendar)."

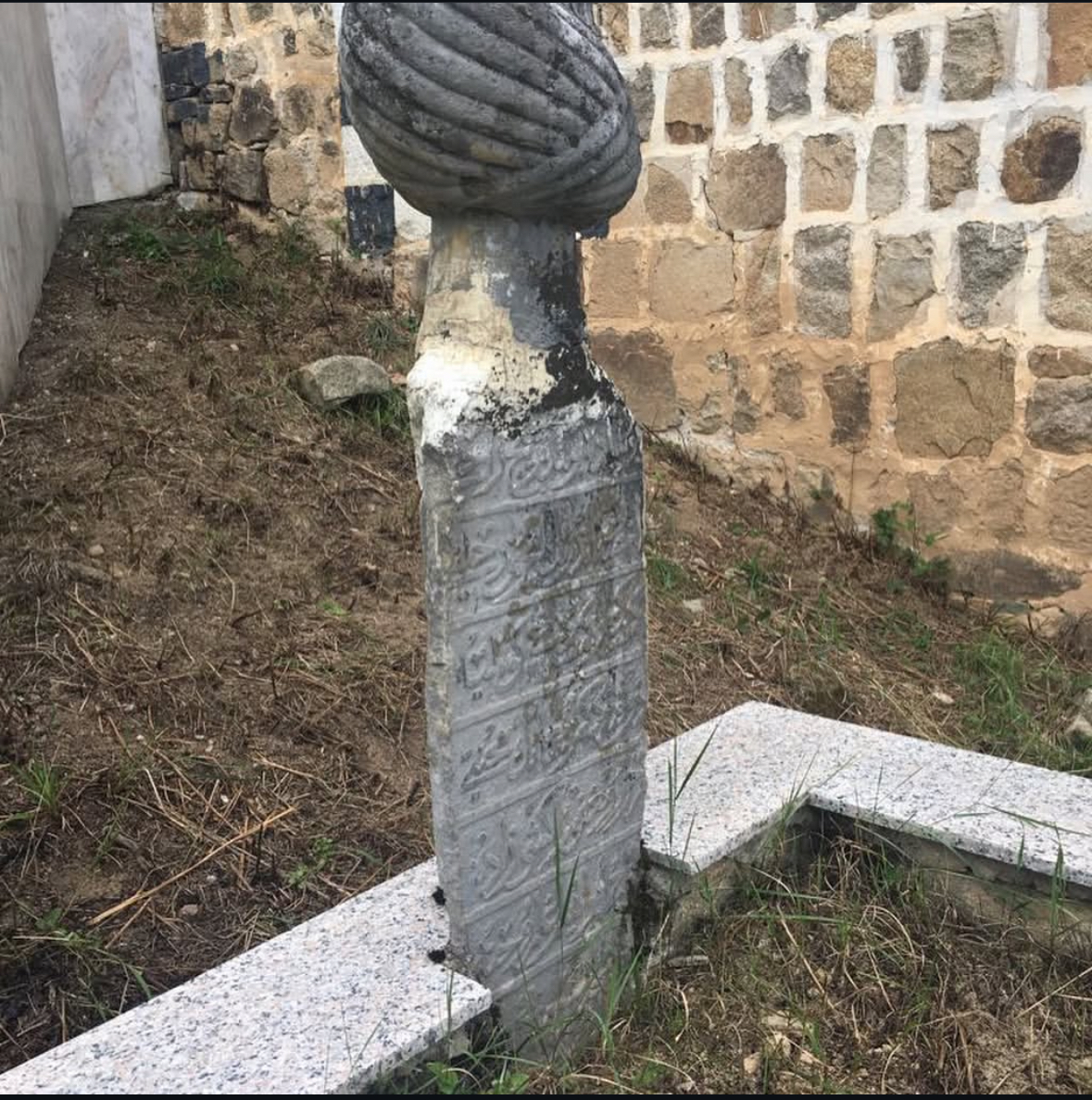
Tombstone of Hacı İbrahim Ekşi, Bayırköy, İkizdere, Rize

== Geography ==
The village is located 6 kilometres (3.7 mi) away from İkizdere.
