= Ayvalık, İkizdere =

Ayvalık Kapse Of
- Village
- Location in Turkey
- Coordinates: 40.8038°N 40.5213°E
- Country: Turkey
- Province: Rize
- District: İkizdere
- Elevation: 805 m (2,641 ft)
- Population (2021): 93
- Time zone: UTC+3 (TRT)

Ayvalık is a village in the İkizdere District, Rize Province, in Black Sea Region of Turkey. Its population is 93 (2021).

== History ==
Some of the villagers are ethnically Laz.

== Geography ==
The village is located 6 kilometres (3.7 mi) away from İkizdere.
