= Western Armenian =

Major dialect group and standard form of Armenian

- -gë dialects
- Արեւմտահայերէն Arevmdahayerēn
- Pronunciation: [ɑɾɛvmədɑhɑjɛˈɾɛn]
- Native to: Turkey (Armenian Highlands), Georgia (country), Armenia, Cyprus, Iraq, Lebanon, Syria
- Ethnicity: Armenians
- Native speakers: 1.6 million (2019)
- Language family: Indo-European: Armenian; Western Armenian
- Writing system: Armenian alphabet (virtually always in the Classical Armenian orthography)

Language codes
- ISO 639-3: hyw
- Glottolog: homs1234
- Linguasphere: 57-AAA-ac
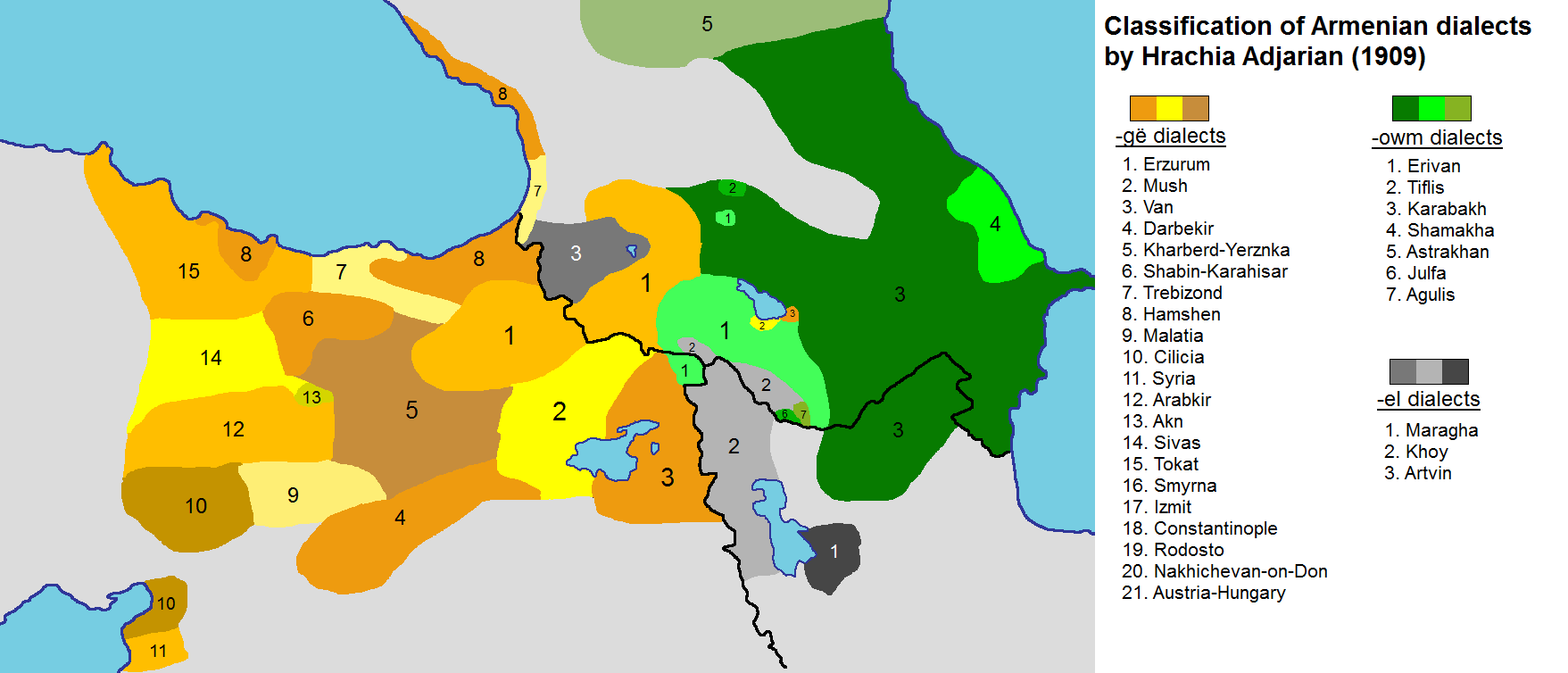
- Map of the Armenian dialects in early 20th century: -gë dialects, corresponding to Western Armenian, are in yellow.

- Western Armenian is classified as Vulnerable by the UNESCO Atlas of the World's Languages in Danger

Western Armenian (Western Armenian: Արեւմտահայերէն, romanized: Arevmdahayeren [ɑɾɛvmədɑhɑjɛˈɾɛn]) (Note: Pronounced Arevmtahayeren [ɑɾɛvmətɑhɑjɛˈɾɛn] in Eastern Armenian and spelled արևմտահայերեն in reformed orthography.) is one of the two standardized forms of Modern Armenian, the other being Eastern Armenian. It is based mainly on the Istanbul Armenian dialect, as opposed to Eastern Armenian, which is mainly based on the Yerevan Armenian dialect.

Until the early 20th century, various Western Armenian dialects were spoken in the Ottoman Empire, predominantly in the historically Armenian populated regions of Western Armenia. The dialectal varieties of Western Armenian currently in use include Homshetsi, spoken by the Hemshin people; the dialects of Armenians in Kessab, Latakia and Jisr al-Shughur in Syria, Anjar in Lebanon, and Istanbul and Vakıflı, in Turkey (part of the "Sueidia" dialect). The Sasun and Mush dialects are also spoken in modern-day Armenian villages such as Bazmaberd and Sasnashen. The Cilician dialect is also spoken in Cyprus, where it is taught in Armenian schools (Nareg), and is the first language of about 3,000 people of Armenian descent.

Forms of the Karin dialect of Western Armenian are spoken by several hundred thousand people in Northern Armenia, mostly in Gyumri, Artik, Akhuryan, and around 130 villages in the Shirak province, and by Armenians in Samtskhe–Javakheti province of Georgia (Akhalkalaki, Akhaltsikhe).

A mostly diasporic language and one that is not an official language of any state, Western Armenian faces extinction as its native speakers lose fluency in Western Armenian amid pressures to assimilate into their host countries. According to Ethnologue, there are 1.58 million native speakers of Western Armenian, primarily in Turkey, Armenia, Georgia, Lebanon, and Iraq. The language is classified as 6b (i.e., threatened, with interruptions in intergenerational transmission).

== Classification ==
Western Armenian is an Indo-European language belonging to the Armenic branch of the family, alongside Eastern and Classical Armenian. According to Glottolog, Antioch, Artial, Asia Minor, Bolu, Hamshenic, Cilicia, Mush-Tigranakert, Stanoz, Vanic and Yozgat are the main dialects of Western Armenian.

== Speakers ==
Western Armenian is spoken by Armenians of most of Southeast Europe and West Asia except for Iran, and Rostov-on-Don in Russia. It is a moribund language spoken by only a small percentage of Armenians in Turkey (especially in Istanbul) as a first language, with 18 percent among the community in general and 8 percent among younger people. There are notable diaspora L2 Western Armenian speakers in Lebanon (Beirut), Syria (Aleppo, Damascus), California (Fresno, Los Angeles), and France (Marseilles).

Western Armenian used to be the dominant Armenian variety, but as a result of the Armenian genocide, the speakers of Western Armenian were mostly murdered or exiled. Those who fled to Eastern Armenia now speak either Eastern Armenian or have a diglossic situation between Western Armenian dialects in informal usage and an Eastern Armenian standard. The only Western Armenian dialect still spoken in Western Armenia is the Homshetsi dialect, since the Hemshin peoples, who were Muslim converts, did not fall victim to the Armenian genocide.

Western Armenian isn't just predominant for Armenians in West Asia, the Armenians living in Southeastern Europe/Balkans, mostly Bulgaria, Romania, Greece, and Turkey (Istanbul) are Western Armenian speakers, who immigrated of the Armenian Genocide. Historically there was presence of Western Armenians (Cilicians) in Moldova.

On 21 February 2009, International Mother Language Day, a new edition of the Atlas of the World's Languages in Danger was released by UNESCO in which the Western Armenian language in Turkey was defined as a definitely endangered language.

== Modern-day speakers ==
In modern-day Armenia, the city of Gyumri took host to large numbers of Armenian refugees fleeing the Ottoman Empire from the Armenian Genocide. Many of these people spoke the Karin dialect of Armenian, which is spoken in Gyumri, but over time, many Eastern Armenian and Russian words have been borrowed into the dialect. There was also a wave of Armenians coming from the rest of West Asia who were Western Armenian, who moved to the Soviet Union, mostly in Soviet Armenia. Many have assimilated into the Eastern Armenian dialect.

=== Endangerment and efforts to revitalize ===
Shushan Karapetian, in her evaluation of both the Eastern and Western dialects of Armenian, concludes that heritage languages, in the face of an English dominant society, rapidly die out within no more than 2 generations, calling America a "linguistic graveyard." In US census data, the percentage of people of Armenian ancestry who speak Western Armenian at home has rapidly declined, down from 25% in 1980 to 16% in 2000.

Despite Western Armenian being an endangered language, there are efforts to revive the language in Los Angeles, which has the largest population of Armenian-speakers outside of Armenia. The University of California, Los Angeles, has an Armenian studies program which has contributed to Western Armenian literature.

== Phonology ==
=== Vowels ===
==== Monophthongs ====
Western Armenian has seven monophthongs.

	Front		Central	Back
	unr.	rnd.	Central	Back
Close	i ⟨ի⟩	ʏ ⟨իւ⟩		u ⟨ու⟩
Mid	e ~ ɛ ⟨ե, է⟩		ə ⟨ը⟩	o ⟨ո, օ⟩
Open	e ~ ɛ ⟨ե, է⟩			ɑ ⟨ա⟩

- The use of ⟨է, ե⟩ and ⟨ո, օ⟩ depends on the vowel's context in the word. See the Orthography section below for details.
- /ʏ/ is sometimes realized as [ju] in nonstandard speech. The syllable /tʏn/ also shows phonetic variation, even in formal speech, with pronunciations ranging from [tʃ(j)un] and [tjun] to [t͡ʃʏn] and [tʏn].

Phoneme	Example (IPA)	Example (written)	Gloss
/i/	/im/	իմ	'my'
/ʏ/	/hʏɾ/	հիւր	'guest'
/ɛ/	/ɛt͡ʃʰ/	էջ	'page'
/ɑ/	/ɑɾɛv/	արեւ	'sun'
/ə/	/əsɛl/	ըսել	'to say'
/o/	/t͡ʃʰoɾ/	չոր	'dry'
/u/	/uɾ/	ուր	'where'

==== Diphthongs ====
Western Armenian has nine vowel sequences in which two vowels appear together in the orthography but belong to the same syllable, forming diphthongs.

The letter ⟨ե⟩ frequently participates in diphthongs, representing sounds such as /jɑ/ and /jo/. When word-initial, ⟨ե⟩ alone denotes /jɛ/. The letter ⟨յ⟩ functions as a postvocalic glide, marking /j/ following vowels.

The cluster ⟨իյ⟩ /ij/ (solely in the word in իյնալ [iˈnɑl]) has generally merged with ⟨ի⟩ /i/ through glide loss.

IPA	Example (IPA)	Example (written)	Meaning	Notes
jɑ	/sɛnjɑg/	սենեակ	"room"	
jɛ	/jɛrɑz/	երազ	"dream"	
ji	/mɑjis/	Մայիս	"May"	
jo	/jotə/	եօթը	"seven"	
ju	/gɑjun/	կայուն	"firm"	
ɑj	/mɑjr/	մայր	"mother"	
uj	/kujr/	քոյր	"sister"	
ɛj	/tɛj/	թէյ	"tea"	Extremely rare.
oj	/χoj/	խոյ	"ram"	Rare.

In some cases, vowel sequences span syllable or morpheme boundaries rather than forming true diphthongs; in those environments, glide formation (yod insertion) is expected.

=== Consonants ===
This is the Western Armenian Consonantal System using letters from the International Phonetic Alphabet (IPA), followed by the corresponding Armenian letter in brackets.

		Labial	Dental/Alveolar		Post- alveolar	Dorsal	Glottal
		Labial	plain	sibilant	Post- alveolar	Dorsal	Glottal
Nasal		m ⟨մ⟩	n ⟨ն⟩				
Plosive/ Affricate	aspirated	pʰ ⟨բ, փ⟩	tʰ ⟨դ, թ⟩	tsʰ ⟨ձ, ց⟩	tʃʰ ⟨չ, ջ⟩	kʰ ⟨գ, ք⟩	
Plosive/ Affricate	voiced	b ⟨պ⟩	d ⟨տ⟩	dz ⟨ծ⟩	dʒ ⟨ճ⟩	ɡ ⟨կ⟩	
Fricative	voiceless	f ⟨ֆ⟩		s ⟨ս⟩	ʃ ⟨շ⟩	χ ⟨խ⟩	h ⟨հ, յ⟩
Fricative	voiced	v ⟨վ, ւ, ու, ո⟩		z ⟨զ⟩	ʒ ⟨ժ⟩	ʁ ⟨ղ⟩	
Approximant			l ⟨լ⟩			j ⟨յ, ե, ի⟩	
Tap			ɾ ⟨ռ, ր⟩				

- The /f/ in Armenian is rare and exclusively used in non-native words; the letter "ֆ" was added to the alphabet much later.
- The /w/ glide is not used except for foreign proper nouns, like Washington (by utilizing the "u" vowel, Armenian "ու").
- The letters ր and ռ, although theoretically different, are generally realized as a single phoneme [ɾ] in Western Armenian. They will both be transcribed as /r/ henceforth.
- The phoneme /ŋ/ appears as an allophone of /n/ before a velar stop (i.e. a /g/ or a /k/).

== Phonological differences with Classical Armenian ==
=== Stop and Affricate System ===
The primary phonological difference between Western Armenian and Classical Armenian lies in the stop and affricate system.

Classical Armenian distinguished three series of stops and affricates: voiced, voiceless unaspirated (plain), and voiceless aspirated. Western Armenian reduced this to a two-way contrast: voiced vs. aspirated. As a result, Classical Armenian's voiced series became aspirated in Western Armenian, while its plain voiceless series became voiced.

In comparison, Eastern Armenian fully preserves this contrast.

Place	Classical Armenian	Western Armenian
Bilabial stops	/b/ ⟨բ⟩, /p/ ⟨պ⟩, /pʰ/ ⟨փ⟩	/b/ (from ⟨պ⟩), /pʰ/ (from ⟨բ⟩, ⟨փ⟩)
Alveolar stops	/d/ ⟨դ⟩, /t/ ⟨տ⟩, /tʰ/ ⟨թ⟩	/d/ (from ⟨տ⟩), /tʰ/ (from ⟨դ⟩, ⟨թ⟩)
Velar stops	/ɡ/ ⟨գ⟩, /k/ ⟨կ⟩, /kʰ/ ⟨ք⟩	/ɡ/ (from ⟨կ⟩), /kʰ/ (from ⟨գ⟩, ⟨ք⟩)
Alveolar affricates	/d͡z/ ⟨ձ⟩, /t͡s/ ⟨ծ⟩, /t͡sʰ/ ⟨ց⟩	/d͡z/ (from ⟨ծ⟩), /t͡sʰ/ (from ⟨ձ⟩, ⟨ց⟩)
Post-alveolar affricates	/d͡ʒ/ ⟨ջ⟩, /t͡ʃ/ ⟨ճ⟩, /t͡ʃʰ/ ⟨չ⟩	/d͡ʒ/ (from ⟨ճ⟩), /t͡ʃʰ/ (from ⟨ջ⟩, ⟨չ⟩)

Example:

Classical Armenian /d͡ʒur/ "water" (⟨ջուր⟩) became Western Armenian /t͡ʃur/.

=== Other phonological differences ===
Feature	Western Armenian	Classical Armenian
Word-initial ⟨ե⟩	generally [jɛ]	/ɛ/*
Word-initial ⟨ո⟩	generally [vo]	/o/
Word-initial ⟨յ⟩	[h]	/j/
Word-final ⟨յ⟩	generally [∅]	/j/
⟨ղ⟩	[ʁ]	/ɫ/-like sound
⟨ւ⟩	[v]	/w/
⟨եւ⟩	[jɛv]	/ɛw/
⟨իւ⟩	[ʏ]	/iw/
⟨ռ⟩ vs. ⟨ր⟩	[ɾ]	/r/ and /ɾ/ respectively*
⟨ե⟩ vs. ⟨է⟩	[ɛ~e]	/ɛ/ and /e/ respectively*

* Note that the exact quality of ե, է, ր and ռ are not known in Classical Armenian. However, they used to be distinct.

== Orthography ==
Western Armenian uses Classical Armenian orthography, also known as Mashdotsian orthography. The Armenian orthography reform (commonly called Abeghian orthography), first introduced in the Armenian Soviet Socialist Republic and used by most Eastern Armenian speakers from Armenia, has not been adopted by Eastern Armenian speakers of Iran and their diaspora or by speakers of Western Armenian, with the exception of periodicals published in Romania and Bulgaria under Communist regimes.

== Morphology ==
=== Nouns ===
Armenian lacks grammatical gender, including in pronouns. A feminine suffix -ուհի /uhi/ exists but carries no grammatical effect.

Western Armenian nouns have six grammatical cases: nominative-accusative (subject / direct object), genitive-dative (possession / indirect object), ablative (origin) and instrumental (means). Except for personal pronouns, the nominative and accusative are the same, and the genitive and dative are the same, meaning that nouns have four distinct forms for case.

Nouns in Armenian also decline for number (singular and plural). They are pluralized with the suffixes -եր /ɛr/ or -ներ /nɛr/, which are generally not interchangeable but follow predictable attachment patterns. Two other non-productive plural suffixes, -ք /k/ and -ց /t͡s/, inherited from Classical Armenian, both survive in a small set of nouns. For example, տղայ /dəʁɑ/ "boy" forms the plural տղաք /dəʁɑk/ "boys," and տիկին /digin/ "madam" forms տիկնանց /dignɑnt͡s/ "madams." Such nouns may follow regular pluralization.

Declension in Armenian is based on how the genitive is formed. There are several declensions, the first three (genitive in i, u, and a respectively) being more common. The genitive in i, however, is by far the most common, while other forms are in gradual decline and are being replaced by the i-form, which has virtually attained the status of a regular form. The plural is consistent across almost all declensions.

	դաշտ (field)		կով (cow)		գարուն (Spring)		օր (day)	
	singular	plural	singular	plural	singular	plural	singular	plural
Nom-Acc (Ուղղական-Հայցական)	դաշտ	դաշտեր	կով	կովեր	գարուն	գարուններ	օր	օրեր
Gen-Dat (Սեռական-Տրական)	դաշտի	դաշտերու	կովու	կովերու	գարնան	գարուններու	օրուայ	օրերու
Abl (Բացառական)	դաշտէ	դաշտերէ	կովէ	կովերէ	գարունէ	գարուններէ	օրէ/օրուընէ	օրերէ
Instr (Գործիական)	դաշտով	դաշտերով	կովով	կովերով	գարունով	գարուններով	օրով	օրերով
	քոյր (sister)		մայր (mother)		Աստուած (God)		գիտութիւն (science)	
	singular	plural	singular	plural	singular	plural	singular	plural
Nom-Acc (Ուղղական-Հայցական)	քոյր	քոյրեր	մայր	մայրեր	Աստուած	աստուածներ	գիտութիւն	գիտութիւններ
Gen-Dat (Սեռական-Տրական)	քրոջ	քոյրերու	մօր	մայրերու	Աստուծոյ	աստուածներու	գիտութեան	գիտութիւններու/ գիտութեանց*
Abl (Բացառական)	քրոջմէ	քոյրերէ	մօրմէ	մայրերէ	Աստուծմէ	աստուածներէ	գիտութիւնէ/գիտութենէ	գիտութիւններէ
Instr (Գործիական)	քրոջմով	քոյրերով	մօրմով	մայրերով	Աստուծմով	աստուածներով	գիտութեամբ/ գիտութիւնով	գիտութիւններով

* Extremely rare.

Other rare declensional forms are also found, though they have almost completely fallen out of use.

=== Articles ===
==== Indefinite Article ====
The indefinite article in Western Armenian is մը /mə/, and it follows the noun:

- Աթոռ մը /ɑtor mə/ – "a chair" (Nom. sg.)
- Աթոռի մը /ɑtori mə/ – "of a chair" (Gen. sg.)

When followed by ալ ("also, too") or by the present/imperfect forms of եմ ("to be"), the article takes the form մըն /mən/:

- Գիրք մը /kirk mə/ – "a book"
- Ասիկա գիրք մըն է /ɑsiga kirk mən ɛ/ – "This is a book."
- Գիրք մըն ալ /kirk mən ɑl/– "A book as well."

==== Definite Article ====
The definite article is a suffix attached directly to the noun.

It appears either as -ն /n/ after vowels or -ը /ə/ after consonants:

- Գիրքը /kirkə/ – "the book" (Nom. sg.)
- Գարին /kɑrin/ – "the barley" (Nom. sg.)

When the noun is immediately followed by ալ, ու ("and"), or by a form of եմ ("to be"), the -ն form is used regardless of final sound:

- Աս գիրքն է /ɑs kirk(ə)n ɛ/ – "This is the book."
- Բարին ու չարը /pɑrin u t͡ʃɑrə/ – "The good and the bad."
- Ինքն ալ /iŋk(ə)n ɑl/– "He/She too."

=== Adjectives ===
Adjectives in Western Armenian are invariable: they do not decline for case or number and always precede the noun:

- լաւ մարդը /lɑv martə/ – "the good man" (Nom. sg.)
- լաւ մարդուն /lɑv martun/ – "to the good man" (Gen. sg.)

=== Personal pronouns ===
Nominative	Accusative	Genitive	Dative	Ablative	Instrumental
ես 'I'	զիս	իմ	ինծի	ինձմէ / ինծմէ	ինձմով / ինծմով
դուն 'you'	քեզ	քու	քեզի	քեզմէ	քեզմով
ինք 'she/he/it'	զինք	իր	իրեն	իրմէ	իրմով
ան 'she/he/it'	զայն	անոր	անոր	անկէ	անով
մենք 'we'	մեզ	մեր	մեզի	մեզմէ	մեզմով
դուք 'you'	ձեզ	ձեր	ձեզի	ձեզմէ	ձեզմով
իրենք 'they'	զիրենք	իրենց	իրենց	իրենցմէ	իրենցմով
անոնք 'they'	զանոնք	անոնց	անոնց	անոնցմէ	անոնցմով

In informal Western Armenian, the accusative case merges with the dative, so the same form is used for both. Speech that preserves the distinct accusative forms is considered more formal or prestigious, as it is descended from Classical Armenian զ- /z/.

In nonstandard speech, the genitive case sometimes merges with the dative, too. For instance, ինծի է (literally "to me it is") is used to mean "it's mine."

Some uses of the instrumental case can also be replaced by the dative + հետ /hɛd/, particularly in informal speech. For example, քեզմով առաջացանք /kɛzmov ɑrɑt͡ʃɑt͡sɑŋk/ "we advanced by means of/thanks to you" can also be expressed as քեզի հետ առաջացանք /kɛzi hɛd-/. A similar construction uses a genitive pronoun + հետ + a possessive enclitic, as in քու հետդ առաջացանք /ku hɛdət-/. These constructions overlap in meaning in some contexts, but are generally not interchangeable.

=== Demonstrative pronouns ===
	Proximal		Medial		Distal	
	Singular	Plural	Singular	Plural	Singular	Plural
Nominative-Accusative	ասիկա	ասոնք	ատիկա	ատոնք	անիկա	անոնք
Genitive-Dative	ասոր	ասոնց	ատոր	ատոնց	անոր	անոնց
Ablative	ասկէ	ասոնցմէ	ատկէ	ատոնցմէ	անկէ	անոնցմէ
Instrumental	ասով	ասոնցմով	ատով	ատոնցմով	անով	անոնցմով

The primary distinction among proximal, medial, and distal demonstrative pronouns lies in the initial consonants ս (s), տ (d), and ն (n).

=== Relative pronouns ===
	Singular	Plural
Nominative	որ	որոնք
Accusative	զոր	զորոնք / զորս
Genitive	որու(ն)	որոնց
Dative	որուն	որոնց
Ablative	որմէ	որոնցմէ
Instrumental	որ(մ)ով	որոնցմով

The accusative case is hardly seen in informal speech; it generally merges with the nominative case.

== Verbs ==
Armenian verbs are fully conjugated for all pronouns, and as such, the language is pro-drop. Verbs in Armenian are complex but are based on two basic series of forms, a "present" form and an "imperfect" form. From this, all other tenses and moods are formed with various particles and constructions. There is a third form, the preterite, which in Armenian is a tense in its own right, and takes no other particles or constructions.

The present tense in Western Armenian is based on three conjugations (a, e, i):

	սիրել (to love)	խօսիլ (to speak)	կարդալ (to read)
ես (I)	սիրեմ	խօսիմ	կարդամ
դուն (thou)	սիրես	խօսիս	կարդաս
ան (he/she/it)	սիրէ	խօսի	կարդա
մենք (we)	սիրենք	խօսինք	կարդանք
դուք (you.pl)	սիրէք	խօսիք	կարդաք
անոնք (they)	սիրեն	խօսին	կարդան

The present tense is made by adding the particle կը (gə) before the "present" form, except for five defective verbs: եմ (em: I am), կամ (gam: I exist, I'm there), ունիմ (unim: I have), գիտեմ (kidem: I know), կրնամ (gərnam: I can).

The future tense is formed by adding պիտի (bidi), often shortened to պիտ (bid) in rapid speech.

- Ես գիրքը կը կարդամ /jɛs kirkə gə gɑrtɑm/ – "I am reading the book" or "I read the book."
- Ես գիրքը պիտի կարդամ /jɛs kirkə bidi gɑrtɑm/ – "I will read the book."

For defective verbs, the future tense is formed as follows: ըլլամ (used for both եմ and կամ), ունենամ, գիտնամ, and կարենամ/կրնամ, respectively.

In the vernacular language, the particle կոր /gor/ (< Turkish -iyor) is added after the verb to indicate present progressive tense. This distinction is not made in literary Armenian.

- Ես գիրքը կը կարդամ կոր /jɛs kirkə gə gɑrtɑm gor/ – "I am reading the book."

== Bibliography ==
- Melkonian, Zareh (1990). Գործնական Քերականութիւն – Արդի Հայերէն Լեզուի (Միջին եւ Բարձրագոյն Դասընթացք) [Practical Grammar – For Modern Armenian (Intermediate and Advanced Course)] (in Armenian) (Fourth ed.). Los Angeles.
- Sakayan, Dora (2000). Modern Western Armenian For the English-speaking World: A Contrastive Approach. Montreal: Arod Books. ISBN 0-9699879-2-7.
- Samuelian, Thomas J. (1989). A Course in Modern Western Armenian: Dictionary and Linguistic Notes. New York City, New York: Armenian National Education Committee. ISBN 0-9617933-2-5.
- Chahinian, Talar; Anny Balakian (16 December 2015). "Language in Armenian American communities: Western Armenian and efforts for preservation". International Journal of the Sociology of Language (237). doi:10.1515/ijsl-2015-0034. S2CID 147596230. Archived from the original on 8 February 2020.
- Vaux, Bert (1998). The Phonology of Armenian. Oxford: Oxford University Press. ISBN 978-0-19-823661-0.
