= Meşeköy, İkizdere =

Meşeköy Petran
- Village
- Country: Turkey
- Province: Rize
- District: İkizdere
- Elevation: 1,850 m (6,070 ft)
- Population (2021): 281
- Time zone: UTC+3 (TRT)

Meşeköy is a village in the İkizdere District, Rize Province, in Black Sea Region of Turkey. Its population is 281 (2021).

== History ==
Some of the villagers are ethnically Laz. Village is famous for Lazboard festival.

== Geography ==
The village is located 5 kilometres (3.1 mi) away from İkizdere.
