= Principality of Hamamshen =

Medieval Armenian principality

Principality of Hamamshen Համամշէն
- 790–1486
- Capital: Hamamshen
- Common languages: Armenian
- Religion: Armenian Apostolic Church
- Government: Principality
- Prince
- Historical era: Middle Ages
  - Established: 790
  - Disestablished: 1486
| Preceded by | Succeeded by |
| Emirate of Armenia | Ottoman Empire |

The Principality of Hamamshen (Homshetsi dialect: Համամշէն, Eshakhutatun Hamamshen) was a small principality established in about 790 by Armenians who fled the Arab invasions of Armenia and the creation of the Muslim Arab-ruled state of Arminiya.

== History ==
Prior to the 8th century, the entire region was populated by Laz and was part of the Abkhazia until the later part of the century when Prince Hamam, his father Prince Shapuh Amatuni and 12,000 of their subjects migrated North to the Black Sea region in order to escape incoming Arab invasions of Vaspurakan, the land of their origin. They settled in the ruined city of Tambur and its surrounding villages. Prince Hamam rebuilt the city and named it Hamamshen, meaning "Hamam's hamlet" in Armenian. It is north of the historic Armenian region of Tayk.

=== Establishment to decline ===
The Amatuni dynasty became the Nakharar of the principality and originated in the Artaz region in Vaspurakan and specialized in agriculture and architectural engineering. the medieval line of princes recorded from the last prince David II. Were Arakel d.1400, David I d.1425, Vart d.1440, Veke d.1460.

As an indirect result of the fall of the Empire of Trebizond in 1461 to the Ottomans and the breakup of a greater Christian power in the region: Between 1480 and 1486, the region was conquered by the Ottoman Empire.

The last prince of Hamamshen, Baron David II was exiled to Ispir by the Ottomans following the conquest of Trebizond. Khachkar (now Kaçkar), which was the centre of the principality was demolished by the Ottomans. Der Hovhannes Hamshentsi, d. 1497, was a prominent monk, philosopher, and orator during this time.

After the fall of the principality, the Hamshentsi Armenians were scattered throughout the Black Sea region in the Trabzon Eyalet establishing communities in towns and villages from Samsun in the west to Hopa in the east. During Ottoman rule taxation and Islamization of the Laz people pressured some Hamshen communities to convert to Islam to have equality and avoid harassment from their Muslim neighbors, many others fled to remote regions in mountains and forests to avoid taxation and oppression, notably a man named Husep who led a group into Sera Dere to found the hidden village of Cevizlik where they remained hidden for 30 years.

== Legacy ==
After several centuries, the name Hamamshen evolved into Hamshen in the Armenian language, and Hemshin in the Turkish language. The Armenians of Hamamshen were cut off from the rest of the Armenian social and cultural world and developed their own distinct ethnic identity. Those who converted to Islam also lost their millet Armenian identity, were Ottomanized, and forgot their Armenian roots. Others, who remained Christian, retained their Armenian identity and later fled to Abkhazia under the Russian Empire

== See also ==
- Hemshin peoples
- Hemşin
- Lazistan
- Emirate of Armenia
- Empire of Trebizond
- Pontus
