= Lazboard =

Tool used for skiing on snow

Lazboard or petranboard is a tool used for skiing on snow in Petran Plateau of İkizdere district of Rize in Turkey. It is known for the Lazboard festival, which held every year. According to a research, villagers from Petran are the oldest group who are actively using a tool similar to snowboard. Lazboard name is derived from Laz people of the region.

== Properties ==
The size of the board is designed to be suitable for the weight and height of the person who will use it. The pine tree is soaked in boiling water in the cooker until it reaches the desired flexibility. The front of the board is bent so that it does not sink as it slides, and the board is left to dry. After the timbers dry, they are brought side by side and joined with laths. The slats are attached according to the sliding position of the person. Then the wood is sanded. Finally, beef tallow is spread to the bottom of the board to reduce friction. A stick made of hazelnut wood is used to direct the Lazboard, and a rope tied to the Lazboard is used to stay balanced. The Lazboard can travel at a speed of 80 kilometers per hour.

== Emergence ==
The inhabitants of Petran village prayed on the wood they had cut and rubbed the surface of the wood with snow to clean it. According to a rumor, one of the children cleaning the board tries to slide with the board because he is bored. Seeing this, the villagers begin to use the griddle board to go from the village to the city.

== History ==
It is debatable how long the straining board has been used. It is thought to have been used since the 1600s. The board, which was thought to have been used for transportation purposes, is now used for entertainment purposes. 90% of the village residents stated that they used Lazboard before. American snowboarder Jeremy Jones named the board as Petranboard in 2008, inspired by the old name of Meşeköy, İkizdere. Petranboard/Lazboard Ski Festival has been held in the first week of February every year since 2008. The documentary called Foothills: The Unlinked Heritage of Snowboarding is covering Lazboard. With this documentary, Lazboard's worldwide recognition has increased. Petranboard Ski Festival was not held in 2020 and 2021 due to covid.
