= Gürdere, İkizdere =

Gürdere Etmone, İşkencedere
- Village
- Location in Turkey
- Coordinates: 40°48′25″N 40°33′04″E
- Country: Turkey
- Province: Rize
- District: İkizdere
- Elevation: 764 m (2,507 ft)
- Population (2021): 289
- Time zone: UTC+3 (TRT)

Gürdere is a village in the İkizdere District, Rize Province, in Black Sea Region of Turkey. Its population is 289 (2021).

== History ==
The original name of the village was Etmone (Greek: Ετμονε), which was changed in 1913 to İşkencedere. It was later renamed to current name and granted village status.

== Demographics ==
Some of the villagers are ethnically Laz.

== Geography ==
The village is located 3 kilometres (1.9 mi) away from İkizdere.
