= Demirkapı, İkizdere =

Demirkapı Xomeze
- Village
- Location in Turkey
- Coordinates: 40°45′57″N 40°35′37″E
- Country: Turkey
- Province: Rize
- District: İkizdere
- Elevation: 1,025 m (3,363 ft)
- Population (2021): 191
- Time zone: UTC+3 (TRT)

Demirkapı is a village in the İkizdere District, Rize Province, in the Black Sea Region of Turkey. Its population is 191 according to the 2021 census.

== Geography ==
The village is located at 5 kilometres (3.1 mi), from the İkizdere district.
