= Hemshin people =

Ethnographic group of Armenians

Armenian: Համշենցիներ, Hamshentsiner
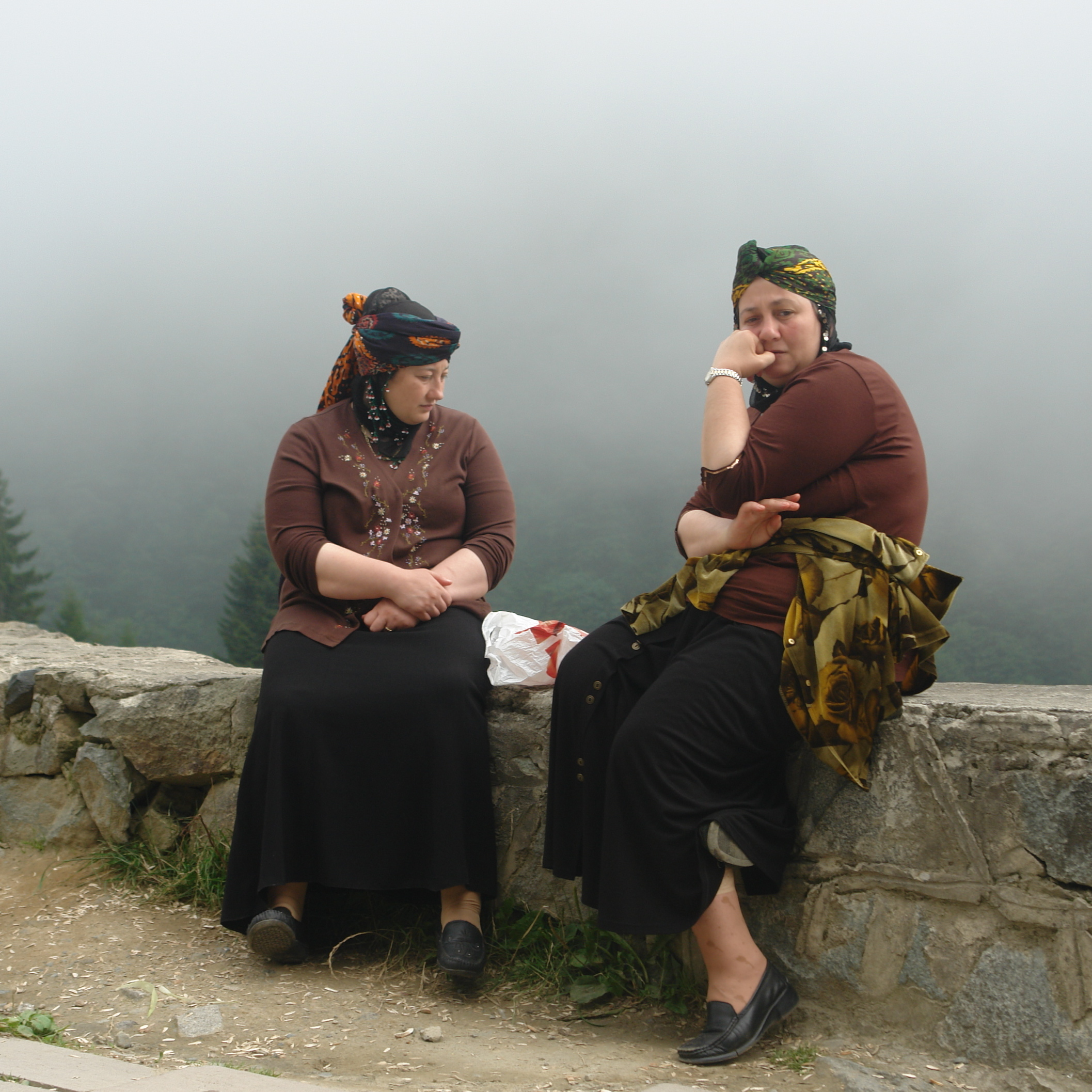
- Hemsheni women in Rize, Turkey

Total population
- 150,000–200,000

Regions with significant populations
- Turkey: Rize, (Note: Majority in Hemşin and Çamlıhemşin; minority in Çayeli and İkizdere.) Artvin, (Note: Almost half of Kemalpaşa; minority in Hopa.) Erzurum (Note: Minority in Tortum and İspir.); Diaspora communities in Trabzon, (Note: Minority in Araklı.) Sakarya and Düzce; Russia: Sochi (Note: More than half of Adlersky City District.)
- Turkey: 150,000
- Russia: 2,082

Languages
- Armenian (Homshetsi dialect), Turkish

Religion
- Sunni Islam in Turkey; Armenian Apostolic in Georgia and Russia

Related ethnic groups
- Armenians, Pontic Greeks, Laz people

The Hemshin people (Armenian: Համշենցիներ, Hamshentsiner; Turkish: Hemşinliler), also known as Hemshinli or Hamshenis or Homshetsi, are an ethnographic group of Armenians who mostly practice Sunni Islam after their conversion from Christianity in the beginning of the 18th century and are affiliated with the Hemşin and Çamlıhemşin districts in the province of Rize, Turkey.

They are Armenian in origin, and were originally Christians and members of the Armenian Apostolic Church, but evolved into a distinct community over the centuries and converted to Sunni Islam after the conquest of the region by the Ottomans during the second half of the 15th century. In Turkey, Hemshin people do not speak the Homshetsi dialect apart from the "Eastern Hamsheni" group living in provinces of Artvin and Sakarya and their mother tongue is now Turkish.

For centuries, the ongoing migration from the geographically isolated highlands to lowlands made the Hemshin people settle in the areas near Trabzon, Artvin and in the Western part of the Black Sea coast. Thus, a significant Hamsheni population formed in those areas.

== History ==
=== Genetic origin ===
The origins of the Hemshin people has remained a subject of debate among scholars. The main two purported homelands of the Hemshin have been Eastern Armenia and Western Armenia. A 2011 genetic survey based on the Y-chromosomal markers of the Hemshin indicated the central part of the historical Armenian highlands as a plausible place of origin for the Hamsheni population.

=== History until the Ottoman conquest ===
The region of Hemshin is located on the coast of the Black sea, in the highlands of Rize Province. According to historical accounts, Armenians first settled in that region at the end of the 8th century. While escaping Arab persecutions, about 12,000 Armenians led by Prince Shapuh Amatuni and his son Hamam moved to Pontos, ruled by the Byzantine Empire. Robert H. Hewsen shows the region where today's Hemşin is located to be populated by a people with different designations throughout ancient and early medieval history. He indicates thereby that some designations may have alternative forms and partially presents the names used with question marks. In summary from the 13th century to 6th century BC Colchians, 550 to 330 BC Colchians and Macrones, 180 BC to 14 AD Lazoi (Chani/Tzan tribes), in the Arsacid Period (63–298 AD) Heniochi, Machelones, Heptakometians, Mossynoeci as well as Sanni, Drilae and Macrones are mentioned.

The Hemşin region is shown as part of Colchis (299–387), Tzanica (387–591) and Chaldia (654–750). The specific location of Hemşin is indicated as Tambur/Hamamašen as a fort and town for the first time in the map covering the period 654–750.

Those two names (Tambur and Hamamašen) are included in the History of Taron by John Mamikonean in a short passage about a war between the ruler of Tambur, Hamam, and his maternal uncle the Georgian Prince, which resulted in the destruction of the town to be rebuilt by Hamam and be named after him, namely Hamamshen.

As soon as [Tiran] read the letter, another letter arrived the same day from Vashdean's sister's son, Hamam, acquainting [Tiran] with the treachery before him from the troops who had come from Iran. He immediately wrote a letter to Vashdean reprimanding him for his plot. Vashdean grew angry and had Hamam's feet and hands lopped off. Then, taking the Iranians, [Vashdean] crossed the Chorox river and went to Hamam's city, named Tambur, which he attacked with fire and sword and enslaved. Now the blessed bishop of the city, Manknos, severely cursed the prince. [Vashdean] ordered the Iranians to kill the priests in the church named Holy Zion. The bishop had silently prayed to God to ask only that the city be turned into a desert and a ruin and that for all eternity no one reside there. He threw himself on the altar and [the Iranians] sacrificed him on Pentecost before mass was offered to Christ. On the next day there was a cloudburst and [Vashdean] was consumed by fire as he sat by the city gates of Tambur. Hamam subsequently [re]built this [city] calling it after himself, Hamamashen. And Mangnos' prayer was realized. In one night 3,000 men died, others fled, and the city remained a ruin.

This event is declared by Mamikonian to have taken place in early seventh century. Hamamashen became Hamshen over time. Simonian who conveys this story reports also that the date given by the author may be wrong.

Two other Armenian chronicles Ghewond and Stepanos Asoghik of Taron, report in short passages in their histories about a migration from Armenia/Oshakan led by prince Shapuh Amatuni and his son Hamam. Ghewond conveys this immigration to be to avoid heavy taxes imposed on Armenians by the Arab rulers. The Amatuni lords are offered fertile land to settle down by the Byzantine Emperor, after they crossed the Çoruh. This migration is dated to be after 789 by Ghewond and as 750 by Stephen Asoghik of Taron.

Benninghaus specifies "Tambur" as the destination of the migration led by Hamam and his father Shapuh Amaduni and says that they have seemingly met people there who were already Christians, possibly Greeks. Redgate informs about possible symbolism used in the Ghewond's history and possible garbling in Mamikonian's history, and cautions not to take everything at face value. Hachikian states "There is no clue as to where Tambur, the legendary capital of Hamshen, was located. The only certain thing about it is that it clearly belonged to a much earlier time - if it existed at all". He also mentions in the footnote the name similarity between Tambur and a yayla known as Tahpur or Tagpur, in the heights of Kaptanpasa. Simonian states that Tambur is probably in the vicinity of Varoşkale (altitude 1800 m).

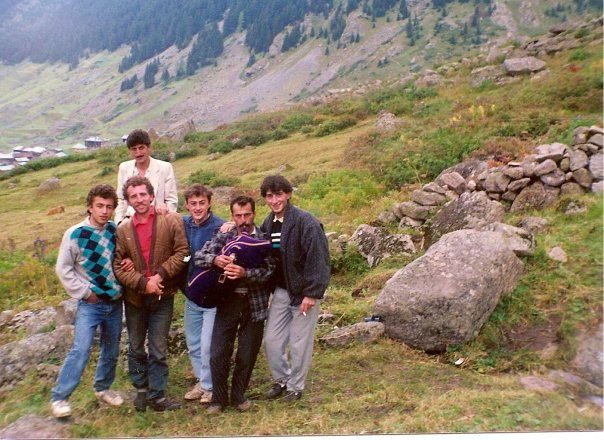
Traditional Hemshin bagpipe, Çamlıhemşin, Rize, Turkey.

A description of "Haynsen" in the Kingdom of Georgia, its inhabitants and history is contained in La Fleur des histoires de la terre d'Orient by Hayton of Corycus, written around 1307, translated into English in 1520, and later reproduced in the travellers' tales of Samuel Purchas published in 1614. Purchas uses the term "Hamsem" to designate the region and concludes that this is the place of the original Cimmerian gloom of Homer's Odyssey. The translation of He'tum's related passage to modern English uses the term Hamshen. Hayton describes the region to be "miraculous and strange place" unbelievable unless seen by one's own eyes, dark and without roads. Signs of human settlement are that "People in those parts say that one frequently hears the sounds of men bellowing, of cocks crowing, of horses neighing in the forest," Those people are described by Hayton, leaning upon Georgian and Armenian Histories, to be the descendants of the men of the "wicked" Iranian Emperor Shaworeos who had chased and harassed Christian people. The referenced translation suggests this Emperor could be Shapur II (309–379 AD). Simonian considers the so described difficulty in access not to imply total isolation. On the contrary, he reports, Hamshen served sometimes as a transit route between the coastal regions and the Armenian Highlands.

In his analysis of the literary and non-literary sources from the 8th through the 19th centuries, combined with excursions into Hamšēn during the 1980s to identify the surviving Armenian architecture, Dr. Robert W. Edwards has defined the geographical perimeters of that region and assessed the historical impact of its extreme isolation.

Sources of the ruling powers in the region, (Byzantine, Trapezuntine, Georgian, Armenian and Turkish) are silent about Hemshin; until the conquest by the Ottomans. It is deduced that Hemşin has been governed by local lords under the umbrella of the greater regional powers changing by the time namely the Bagratid Armenian kingdom, the Byzantine Empire, its successor the Empire of Trebizond, the Kingdom of Georgia, the Kara Koyunlu and Ak Koyunlu Turkmen Confederations until it was annexed by the Ottoman Empire which collapsed as a result of the World War I and gave birth to the Republic of Turkey.

The Ottoman conquest of Hemshin occurred sometime in the 1480s: an Ottoman register dated around 1486 calls it Hemshin and mentions it as being an Ottoman possession.

=== Turkish dominance and division ===
Turkish influence was firmly established in the region after the Battle of Manzikert in 1071, after which the Seljuk Turks and other Turkish tribes gained a strong foothold in Central Anatolia and Western Armenian Highlands, often referred to as Eastern Anatolia, bringing the local population in contact with the religion of Islam. In the 15th century, the region of Hamshen was incorporated into the Ottoman Empire. During the Turkish rule, two most important developments are human migrations and conversions. Most sources agree that prior to Ottoman era majority of the residents of Hemshin were Christian and members of the Armenian Apostolic Church. The details and the accompanying circumstances for the migrations and the conversions during the Ottoman era are not clearly known or documented.

As a result of those developments, distinctive communities with the same generic name have also appeared in the vicinity of Hopa, Turkey as well as in the Caucasus. Those three communities are almost oblivious to one another's existence.

- The Hemshinli of Hemshin proper (also designated occasionally as western Hemshinli in publications) are Turkish-speaking Sunni Muslims who mostly live in the counties (ilçe) of Çamlıhemşin, Çayeli, İkizdere, Pazar and Hemşin in Turkey's Rize Province.
- The Hopa Hemshinli (also designated occasionally as eastern Hemshinli in publications) are Sunni Muslims and mostly live in the Hopa and Borçka counties of Turkey's Artvin Province. In addition to Turkish, they also speak a dialect of western Armenian they call "Homshetsma" or "Hemşince" in Turkish.
- Homshentsik (also designated occasionally as Northern Homshentsik in publications) are Christians who live in partially recognized Abkhazia and in Russia's Krasnodar Krai. They speak Homshetsma as well. There are also some Muslim Hamshentsi living in Georgia and Krasnodar and some Hamshentsi elements amongst the Meskhetian Turks.

== Demographics ==
Two major developments in the Hemshin region during the Ottoman era: Islamization and population movements. Islam may have begun to spread prior to the Ottoman rule, but it did not become the general religion before the end of the 16th century. A number of population movements (both into and out of the region) also happened during the Ottoman era. Even though detailed information regarding the nature of these movements is missing, in summary:

- Some Hemshinli who were members of the Armenian Orthodox Church emigrated to other countries on the eastern Black Sea during the early centuries of Ottoman rule;
- Some Muslim Hemshinli migrated to western Anatolia and the Caucasus as a result of the Russo-Turkish wars and related hardships during the 19th century;
- Some immigration into the area occurred during Ottoman rule.

Flag of the Hemshin people.

The present community of Hemshinli is exclusively Muslim and Turkish speaking. This goes for the people living in Hemshin or people maintaining links to the area and living elsewhere in Turkey.

A distinct community settled about 50 km east of Hemşin in villages around Hopa and Borçka also call themselves "Hemşinli". They are often referred to as the "Hopa Hemşinli". Professor of Linguistics Bert Vaux at the University of Wisconsin-Milwaukee refers to this group as the "Eastern Hamshenis". Hemşinli and Hopa Hemşinli are separated not only by geography but also by language and some features of culture. The two groups are almost oblivious to one another's existence. Simonian reports various theories regarding the appearance of the Hopa Hemshinli group. Those theories relate to whether the groups migrated from Hemshin or they were settled by the Ottoman authorities, whether the migration/settlement was in the early 16th or late 17th centuries, and whether the migration took place in one step or two waves. The Hopa Hemşinli are exclusively Muslim as well. Simonian reports that there is a controversy regarding whether they arrived in the Hopa region as Muslims or converted to Islam after arrival.

The Hopa Hemşinli speak a language called "Hemşince" or ("Homşetsi" and/or Homshetsma in some sources) as well as Turkish. Recent studies by Hovann Simonian (Author: The Hemshin: A Handbook (Caucasus World)) suggest that this language is an archaic dialect of Armenian subject to influence from Turkish and Laz. Vaux also reports that "Hemşince" has been subject to influence from Turkish to a much greater extent than other Armenian dialects. Hemşince and Armenian are largely mutually unintelligible.

In addition to these two groups there are people speaking Hemşince / Homshetsma in the countries of the former USSR whose ancestors probably originated from Hemşin and/or Hopa Hemşin in course of the various population movements to the Caucasus. Many of the Muslim Hemşince speakers in the former USSR were deported from the Adjara area of Georgia during the Stalin era to Kazakhstan and Kyrgyzstan. Since 1989, a considerable number of these deportees have moved to Krasnodar Krai since 1989, along with the Meskhetian Turks.

== Culture ==
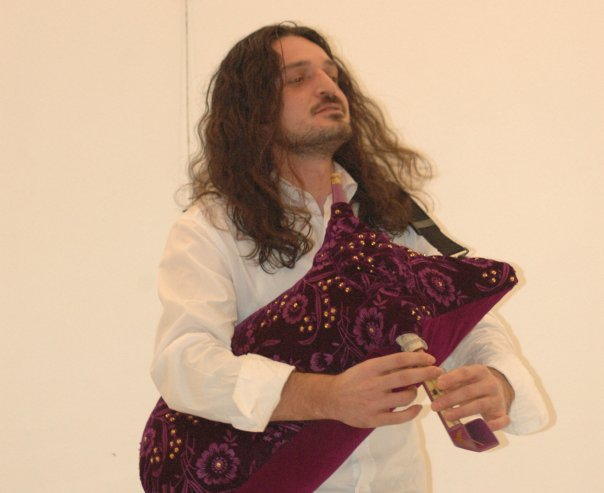
Hemshin musician Behçet Gülas plays the tulum.

Hemshin peoples are well known for their baking, tea growing, and the clever jokes, riddles, and stories that they tell. Some of the anecdotes that the Muslim Hemshinli tell are actually based on older Armenian ones. They accompany dances with their own brand of music using the parkapzuk (for the Western group), the şimşir kaval (flute made of buxus) (for the Eastern group) or the Hamshna-Zurna (Hamsheni zurna) (for the Northern group). The traditional occupations of the Turkish Hemshinli are cultivating tea and maize, breeding livestock, and beekeeping. The Northern Hamshenis of Russia and Georgia, meanwhile, are primarily known as citrus, corn, tobacco and tea growers as well as fishermen.

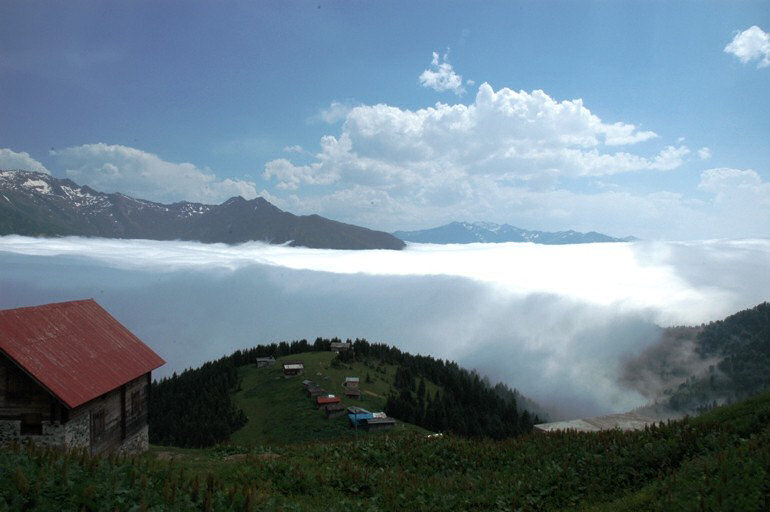
A scenic view in Çamlıhemşin, mostly populated by western Hemshinlis.

The people of Hemshin are renowned for their distinctive traditional attire. Women often choose to wrap their heads with a "pushi" or a long piece of cloth adorned with beads, while men often opt for hats and vests made of wool or cotton.

The Hemshin people and their mansions were featured in issue 12 of Cornucopia magazine.

== Present situation ==
=== Hemşinli in Turkey ===
The "Turkey for the Turks" ideology, writes Neal Ascherson, "offered no security for minorities" with "the tiny Hemşinli group having especially compelling reasons to keep its head down" because "its members are the descendants of Armenians." Beginning in the 1930s, a number of Turkish historians attempted to ascribe an entirely Turkish origin to the Hemshinli, the most prominent of them being M. Fahrettin Kırzıoğlu, whose theories have since gained wide currency among the community. His theories on the Hemshinli, however, have come under close scrutiny and have been roundly criticized. The German scholars Wolfgang Feurstein and Tucha Berdsena describe Kırzıoğlu's methodology as so:

At first Kırzıoğlu assaults the reader with a flow of historical peoples; he then searches for some kind of phonetic correspondence or similarity with an old Turkish tribe, flavors this alleged historical outpouring with a pinch of "Islam," and presents himself as a competent researcher of Turkishness. Probably never before has a single person in Turkey falsified history so massively!

The filmmaker Özcan Alper, an eastern Hemshinli, made the first motion picture in Homshetsi, Momi ("Grandma"), released in 2000. As a result, Alper was accused in the Court for State Security of producing material intended to destroy the unity of the state, under article 8 of Turkey's anti-terror law. This law was repealed in 2003 after EU pressure, and Alper's trial did not go ahead. Hamsheni singer Gökhan Birben (from the Western group) and Laz singer Kâzım Koyuncu had also sung in Homshetsi. In 2005, the first music album exclusively of anonymous Hamshen folk songs and sung mostly in Homshetsi, Vova - Hamşetsu Ğhağ was released.

Older generations of Turkish Hemshinli see the reference "Ermeni" (often used by their Laz neighbours) as an insult.

Mesut Yılmaz, a former Prime Minister of Turkey, was born in Istanbul to a family with partial Hamsheni (Western group) origins. Ahmet Tevfik İleri (who was born in Yaltkaya (Gomno) village of Hemşin), a Deputy Prime Minister and before that, a Minister of Education in Turkey within successive Adnan Menderes governments between 1950 and 1960, as well as Damat Mehmet Ali Pasha, the Ottoman Grand Vizier on the eve of the Crimean War in 1853 were also of Hamsheni descent. The community issued other important names in Turkish history and society such as Murat Karayalçın, a former Deputy Prime Minister and mayor of Ankara who is from Şenyuva (Çinçiva) village of Çamlıhemşin.

There are two ongoing projects involving Turkish NGOs and EuropeAid, European Commission's external aid instrument, that touch their issues. The more recently (2007) launched "Ecodialogue Project" has set itself as goal raising environment consciousness of the region's enterprises and improving the poor levels and quality of the information relayed by local guides, many of whom are self-styled and unlicensed. The other project, started 2004 and involving also the World Conservation Union, aims to raise the profile and awareness of the grouse, particularly black grouse, who visit the region, also with focus on enterprises and guides.

=== Hamshenis in Russia and the former Soviet Union ===
Interest in Hamshen heritage is rising among Christian Hamshenis in the former Soviet Union. In 2006, the first music album in Homshetsma by the Ensemble Caravan was released in Krasnodar. Hamshen Scientific, Information and Cultural Centre began to work on exclusive projects in order to recover the cultural heritage of the Hamshenis living in the region. The Armenian newspaper published in Sukhumi carries the name Hamshen.

During the Mikhail Gorbachev period of the Soviet Union in the late 1980s, the Hamshenis of Kazakhstan began petitioning for the government to move them to the Armenian SSR. However, this move was denied by Moscow because of fears that the Muslim Hamshenis might spark ethnic conflicts with their Christian Armenian brothers.

After the dissolution of the Soviet Union, most Hamshenis lived relatively undisturbed. However, those in the Abkhazia region of Georgia had trouble coping with day-to-day life during the Georgian Civil War.

Since 2000, several hundred of the Muslim Hamshenis in Russia who have resettled from Kazakhstan and Kyrgyzstan to Krasnodar Krai (about 1000 total) have repeatedly attempted to formally receive registration from the local authorities. This is similar and related to the problem of the Meskhetians. These actions have been made difficult by the attitude of the Krasnodar officials. In defiance of the authorities an organisation of their co-ethnics in Armenia have appealed to the Russian ambassador in Yerevan to get Moscow to intervene in this case and overrule the regional officials who seem intent on preventing Hamshenis from gaining a status of permanent residency.

In the 2002 Russian Federation census, 1,542 people identified themselves as Hamshenis, two-thirds of whom were living in Krasnodar Krai.

Sochi has an ethnic Russian majority (~70%) but is home to a sizable Armenian minority (~20%), which is especially notable in the Adlersky City District where they compose more than half of the total population. Most of Sochi's Armenian community are descendants of Hamshen Armenians from Turkey's northeastern Black Sea coast, who began arriving in the late 19th century.

=== Recognition by the Armenian mainstream ===
From October 13 to 15, 2005, a Hamsheni international scientific convention was held in Sochi. The conference was organized under the Institute of History of the Academy of Sciences of Armenia, Russian-Armenian Commonwealth Organization of Moscow (commissioned by the Armenian Revolutionary Federation) with help from the Armenian Scientific Informational and Cultural Center, "Hamshen" (Krasnodar, Russia) and Russian Armenian newspaper Yerkramas. It involved scholars from Armenia, Russia, the United States, Germany, and Iran to discuss the past of the Hamshenis.

== Notable Hamshenis ==
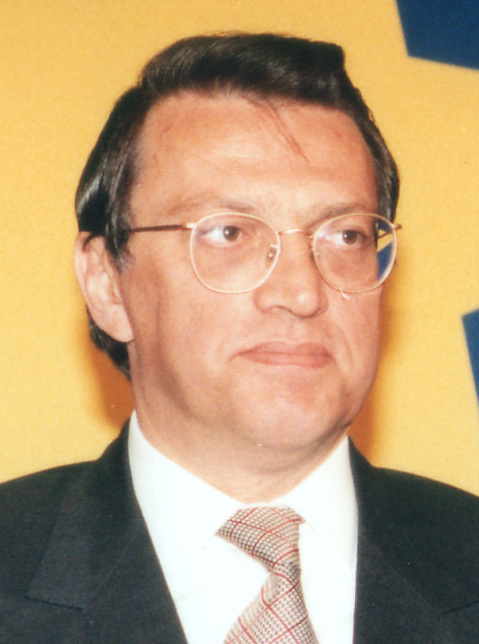
Mesut Yılmaz, 21st Prime Minister of Turkey
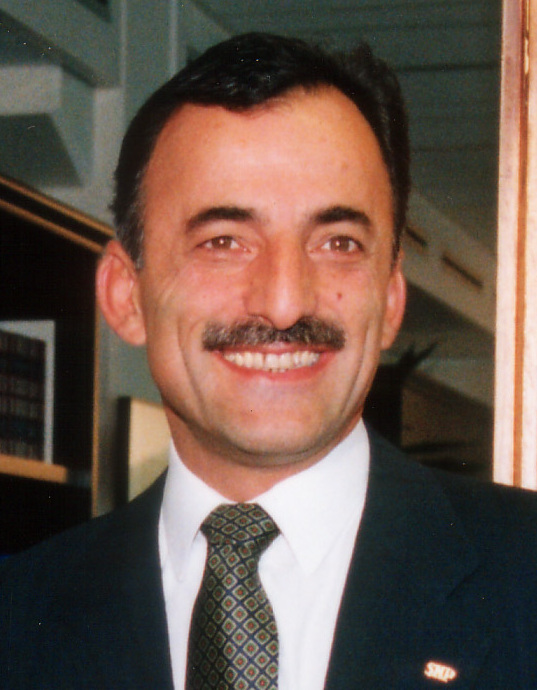
Murat Karayalçın, former Minister of Foreign Affairs and Mayor of Ankara
- Cemil Aksu (born 1977), political and social activist, journalist and ecologist
- Özcan Alper (born 1975), film director and screenwriter
- Cihan Alptekin (1947–1972), political activist, revolutionary and militant who was leader of left-wing organisations such as People's Liberation Army of Turkey and Revolutionary Youth Federation of Turkey
- Remzi Bekar (born 1937), tulum artist
- Gökhan Birben (born 1969), singer
- Yaşar Çorbacıoğlu (born 1939), tulum artist
- Dindar Güner (born 1942), tulum artist
- Murat Karayalçın (born 1943), former Minister of Foreign Affairs, Deputy Prime Minister, mayor of Ankara (1989–1993) and founder of the Social Democratic People's Party (SHP)
- Sinem Kobal (born 1987), actor
- Behçet Gülas (born 1977), singer and musician
- Tevfik İleri (1911–1961), former Minister of Public Works (1958-1960), Deputy Prime Minister of Turkey (1957-1958), Minister of National Education (1957) and Minister of Transport (1950)
- Alper Taş (born 1967), socialist politician and leader of Left Party
- Aydoğan Topal (born 1982), singer
- Mahmut Turan (born 1958), tulum artist
- Emin Yağcı (born 1965), tulum artist
- Mesut Yılmaz (1947–2020), 21st Prime Minister of Turkey, chairman of the Motherland Party

== See also ==
- Amatuni
- Armenians in Turkey
- Armeno-Tats
- Cherkesogai
- Christianity in Turkey
- Chveneburi
- Crypto-Armenians
- Adjarians
- Islam in Armenia
- Laz people
- Minorities in Turkey
- Hayhurum
- Principality of Hamamshen

== Bibliography ==
- Andrews, Peter A. & Benninghaus, Rüdiger, eds. (1989). Ethnic Groups in the Republic of Turkey. Supplements to the Tübingen Atlas of the Middle East: Series B (Humanities) No. 60.2. Wiesbaden: Dr. Ludwig Reichert Verlag.
- Dubin, Marc S. & Lucas, Enver (1989). Trekking in Turkey. South Yarra, Vic.: Lonely Planet. p. 126. ISBN 978-0-864420374.
- Hewsen, Robert H. (2000). Armenia: A Historical Atlas. Chicago: University of Chicago Press.
- Simonian, Hovann H., ed. (2007). The Hemshin: History, Society and Identity in the Highlands of Northeast Turkey (PDF). London: Routledge. ISBN 978-1-135-79829-1. Archived from the original (PDF) on 3 May 2013.
  - Awde, Nicholas (2007). "Foreword". The Hemshin: History, Society and Identity in the Highlands of Northeast Turkey.
  - Beller-Hann, Ildiko (2007). "Hemshinli-Lazi Relations in Northeast Turkey". The Hemshin: History, Society and Identity in the Highlands of Northeast Turkey.
  - Benninghaus, Rüdiger (2007). "Turk and Hemshinli: Manipulating Ethnic Origin and Identity". The Hemshin: History, Society and Identity in the Highlands of Northeast Turkey.
  - Blasing, Uwe (2007). "Armenian in the vocabulary and culture of the Turkish Hemshinli". The Hemshin: History, Society and Identity in the Highlands of Northeast Turkey.
  - Hachikian, Hagop (2007). "Notes on the Historical Geography and Present Territorial Distribution of the Hemshinli". The Hemshin: History, Society and Identity in the Highlands of Northeast Turkey.
  - Simonian, Hovann H. (2007a). "Hamshen Before Hemshin: The Prelude to Islamicization". The Hemshin: History, Society and Identity in the Highlands of Northeast Turkey.
  - Simonian, Hovann H. (2007b). "Hemshin from Islamicization to the End of the Nineteenth Century". The Hemshin: History, Society and Identity in the Highlands of Northeast Turkey.
  - Redgate, Anne Elizabeth (2007). "Morale, Cohesion and Power in the First Centuries of Amatuni Hamshen". The Hemshin: History, Society and Identity in the Highlands of Northeast Turkey.
  - Vaux, Bert (2007). "Homshetsma: The language of the Armenians of Hamshen". The Hemshin: History, Society and Identity in the Highlands of Northeast Turkey.
- Vaux, Bert (2001). "Hemshinli: The Forgotten Black Sea Armenians" (PDF). Harvard Working Papers in Linguistics. Cambridge, Massachusetts: Harvard University. Archived from the original (PDF) on 12 September 2006.
- Papikyan, Arpine (March 2016). "The cultural identity of Islamized Hemshin Armenians". M.A. Intercultural Theology (PDF).
- Yepiskoposyan, Levon; Hovhannisyan, Anahit & Khachatryan, Zaruhi (2016). "Genetic Structure of the Armenian Population". Archivum Immunologiae et Therapiae Experimentalis. 64 (Suppl. 1): 113–116. doi:10.1007/s00005-016-0431-9. PMID 28083603. S2CID 7641438.
- Edwards, Robert W. (1988). "Hamšēn: An Armenian Enclave in the Byzanto-Georgian Pontos. A Survey of Literary and Nonliterary Sources". Le Muséon. 101 (3–4): 403–422. doi:10.2143/MUS.101.3.2011410.
- Bennigsen, Alexandre & Wimbush, S. Enders (1986) [1960]. Muslims of the Soviet Empire: A Guide (New ed.). London: C. Hurst & Company. p. 217. ISBN 978-1-850650102.
- Şener, Cemal (2004). "Lazlar/Hemşinler". Türkiye'de Yaşayan Etnik ve Dinsel Gruplar [Ethnic and Religious Groups Living in Turkey] (in Turkish). Etik Yayınları. ISBN 978-9-758565214.
- Wixman, R. (2012). "K̲h̲ems̲h̲in". In P. Bearman; Th. Bianquis; C.E. Bosworth; E. van Donzel; W.P. Heinrichs (eds.). Encyclopaedia of Islam, Second Edition. Brill.
- Karslıoğlu, Yusuf (2009). Doğu Karadeniz Tarihi: Otokton Halkları ve Etnik Yapısı (in Turkish). Universal Yayınları. ISBN 978-975-01165-1-3.
- Ascherson, Neal (1995). Black Sea. London: Jonathan Cape. p. 198.
- Simonian, Hovann H. (2009). "History and Identity Among the Hemshin". In Hovannisian, Richard G. (ed.). Armenian Pontus: The Trebizond-Black Sea Communities. UCLA Armenian History and Culture Series: Historic Armenian Cities and Provinces. Vol. 8. Costa Mesa, CA: Mazda Publishers. pp. 382–387.
- Benninghaus, Rüdiger (2002) [1989]. "Zur Herkunft und Identität der Hemşinli [On the origin and identity of the Hemşinli]". In Andrews, Peter A.; Benninghaus, Rüdiger (eds.). Ethnic Groups in the Republic of Turkey (in German). Wiesbaden: L. Reichert.
