= Sugören =

- Neighbourhood
- Location in Turkey
- Coordinates: 41°22′48″N 41°24′14″E
- Country: Turkey
- Province: Artvin
- District: Hopa
- Municipality: Hopa
- Elevation: 10 m (30 ft)
- Population (2021): 1,076
- Time zone: UTC+3 (TRT)
- Postal code: 08690
- Area code: 0466

Sugören (formerly: Kise) is a neighbourhood of the town Hopa, Hopa District, Artvin Province, Turkey. Its population is 1,076 (2021). It is a coastal village on the Black Sea and on the newly constructed motorway. It is almost merged to Hopa at the east and 80 kilometres (50 mi) to Artvin. The main economic activities of the village are fishing and tea agriculture.
