= Hovann Simonian =

Armenian Swiss scholar in Armenian history

Hovann Simonian (born in Beirut, Lebanon) is an Armenian Swiss scholar in Armenian history, historical geography and culture. Born in Beirut to Armenian parents, he was raised in Switzerland where his family moved at the beginning of the Civil War in Lebanon in 1975.

He is the editor of The Hemshin: History, Society and Identity in the Highlands of Northeast Turkey and co-author of Troubled Waters : the Geopolitics of the Caspian Region with Richard Dekmejian. He is also the administrator, along with Peter Hrechdakian and Mark Arslan, of the Armenian DNA Project.
