= Richard Dekmejian =

Armenian-American Professor Emeritus of political science

Richard Hrair Dekmejian (born 1933, Aleppo, Syria) is an Armenian-American Professor Emeritus of political science at the University of Southern California in Los Angeles (retired May 2017).

== Bibliography ==
- Dekmejian, R. Hrair, 1933- Spectrum of terror / R. Hrair Dekmejian. Washington, D.C. : CQ Press, 2007. 370 p. ISBN 978-1-933116-90-7 (alk. paper)
- Kechichian, Joseph A. and Dekmejian, R. Hrair, 1933- The just prince : a manual of leadership / Joseph A. Kechichian and R. Hrair Dekmejian. London : Saqi Books, 2003. 360 p. ISBN 978-0863567834
- Dekmejian, R. Hrair, 1933– Islam in revolution : fundamentalism in the Arab world / R. Hrair Dekmejian. 2nd ed. Syracuse, N.Y. : Syracuse University Press, 1995. xv, 307 p. : ill.; 23 cm. ISBN 0-8156-2635-5 (alk. paper)
- Dekmejian, R. Hrair, 1933– Troubled waters : the geopolitics of the Caspian Region / R. Hrair Dekmejian and Hovann H. Simonian. London : I.B. Tauris, 2001. vi, 271 p. : ill., 1 map; 25 cm. ISBN 1-86064-639-5
- Dekmejian, R. Hrair, 1933– Egypt under Nasir; a study in political dynamics / R. Hrair Dekmejian. [1st ed.] Albany, State University of New York Press, 1971. xvi, 368 p. illus., port. 25 cm. ISBN 0-87395-080-1
- Dekmejian, R. Hrair, 1933– Patterns of political leadership : Egypt, Israel, Lebanon / R. Hrair Dekmejian. Albany : State University of New York Press, 1975. xi, 323 p. : ill.; 24 cm. ISBN 0-87395-291-X ISBN 0-87395-292-8
- Dekmejian, R. Hrair (1933–) & Thabit, Adel Fathy. "Machiavelli's Arab Precursor: Ibn Zafar al-Siqilli." British Journal of Middle Eastern Studies, vol. 27, no. 2, 2000, pp. 125–137. JSTOR 826088.
