= Amatuni =

Armenian noble family from 4th century

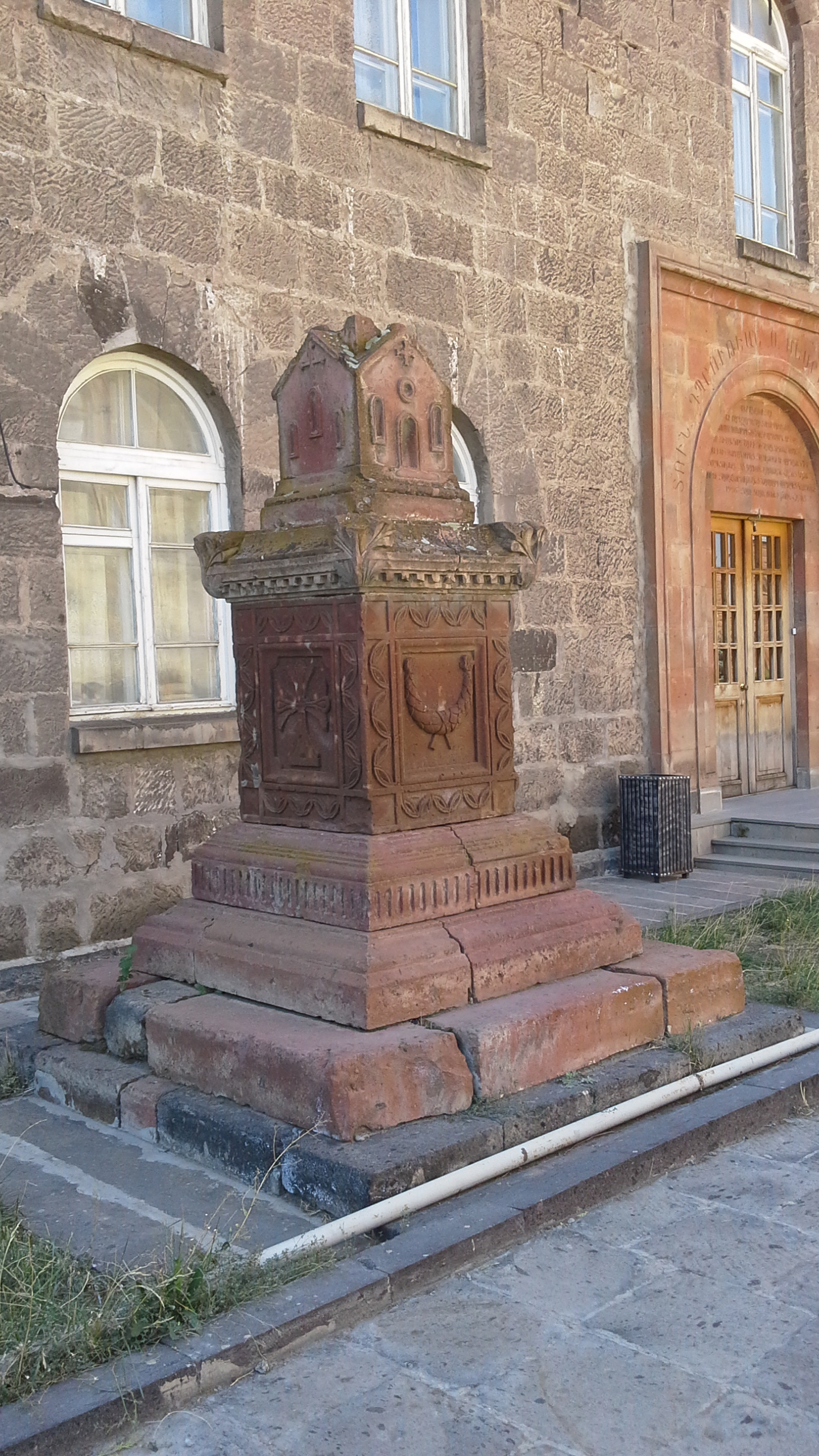
Vahan Amatuni monument, 5th century, Oshakan

The House of Amatuni (Armenian: Ամատունի) is an ancient Armenian noble family, known from the 4th century in the canton of Artaz, between lakes Van and Urmia, with its center at Shavarshan (latter-day Maku), and subsequently also at Aragatsotn, west of Lake Sevan, with the residence at Oshakan.

== Medieval dynasty ==
The Amatuni who was of Caspio-Median or Matianian-Mannaean origin, is given a specious Jewish ancestry from descendants of Samson by the early Armenian tradition (Moses of Chorene 2.57). Their forefather's name Manue suggests a possible connection with the royal Assyrian house of Adiabene. They were variously attributed a descent from Astyages of Media and a Hebrew descent. Also, Armenian princely family of Amatuni believed to be descendants of the kings (chieftains) of the Matienian tribes

In addition, in Antiquity besides its original land of Artaz, the Principality of Amatuniq also included in addition the district of the Djur-shrod (Chuash-rot) with the center in the town of Myarakan, located along the river Araxes, southeast of Artaz. Apparently, starting from 336 A.D. the Amatuni princes were in charge of the tax service of the Armenian kingdom, when the Arshakids bestowed on them the fortress and possession of Oshakan in the heart of their Ayrarat royal domain, not far from the capital of the kingdom Dvin(Moses of Chorene 2.57). Historians described the battle that took place in 336 near Oshakan, between Armenians and Persians, in which Armenians won. For his valor in the liberation wars, in 336, the Armenian king Khosrov III presented Oshakan to Vahan Amatuni. During the wars, the Amatuni sent their Suzerain (overlord), the king of Armenia, 500 horses and cavalry soldiers, which shows the political weight and military potential of this grand princely family. . At the initiative of the princes Amatuni, Mesrop Mashtots, the creator of the Armenian alphabet, was buried here. As Nakharars the Amatuni owned Oshakan until 773, after which these lands came under the control of the Bagratids.

After the Sassanids of Iran abolished the Arsacid monarchy in Armenia in 428, Vahan (II) Amatuni was appointed by the Great King as assistant governor to the Iranian marzpan. However, Sassanid propagation of Zoroastrianism among the Christian Armenians caused the reversal of the Amatuni's loyalty and, in 451, Vahan revolted, only to be banished to Gorgan. In 451, the famous Battle of Avarayr between Armenians and Persians took place in Artaz, south of Maku.

The transfer of regional power from the Sassanids to Muslim Arab rule provoked a large-scale aristocratic insurrection of 774-75.

In the 9th century, when kingdom of Great Armenia was restored, Amatuni still remained in the possession of Artaz, but under the Artsruni of Vaspurakan, until 909, when the Vaspurakan kingdom of the Artsrunis separated from the kingdom of Great Armenia, but Artaz remained loyal to the united Armenian kingdom of the Bagratids and remained part of it. Also, the principality of Amatuni (Artaz) has always had its own separate church diocese, the diocese of Amatuniq. The Vachutean genealogy was reconstructed by Marie Brosset and can be found in his Rapports sur un voyage archéologique dans la Géorgie et dans l'Arménie (St. Petersburg 1849-1851) III: 99-100.

The Artazian branch of Amatuni family was ruling castle of Maku (Shavarshan) stil in XVth century and successfully defend it during Timurleng invasion, when he besieged castle of Maku, as was stated in his book by Castilian diplomat don Ruy González de Clavijo, when he was traveling to the imperial court of emir Timurleng in Samarkand.

A branch of the family still controlled a fiefdom of Artaz in Maku down to the 1500s when Ottomans and Kurdish tribes toppled Armenian rule in the region. while the branch which ruled Hamamshen was overthrown in the 15th century after the Ottomans invaded the empire of Trebizond and exiled its last prince Baron David II to Ispir.

== Later family ==
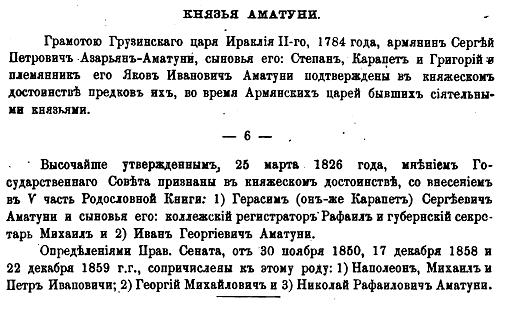
Genealogical chart of Princes Amatuni in the Russian Empire (1892)

After the Middle Ages the Amatuni family disappeared. In the 17th century, one of the representatives of the Amatuni clan, a certain Azarbek I Amatuni, son of Prince George Amatuni, was a melik of the city of Nakhichevan-on-Arax. Melik Azarbek I had sons George, Petros (Peter) and Vahan, who faithfully served with their father the Iranian shah. The children and grandchildren of one of the sons, Peter Azarbekyan Amatuni, moved to the city of Tiflis, where on January 1, 1784, King Irakli II confirmed Sarkis (Sergey) Petrovich Azaryan-Amatuni with his sons Stepan, Karapet, Gregory and his nephew Yakov Ivanovich Amatuni, they were in charge of the dignity of their ancestors, "who were at the time of the Armenian kings, the resplendent princes." At the same time, the coat of arms was approved by the charter of the Georgian king Heraclius II of January 1, 1784. Another branch of the Amatuni clan, descendants of Allahverdi khan Amatuni, were meliks in Karadagh (Arasbaran) until 1918; and also, they were on the board of directors of oil companies of Baku until 1917. After the Russian annexation of Georgia, the family was confirmed in the dignity of Knyaz on March 25, 1826.

== See also ==
- Hemshin peoples
- Principality of Hamamshen
- Hemşin
