= Cumhuriyet, Hopa =

Cumhuriyet
- Neighbourhood
- Location in Turkey
- Coordinates: 41°22′55″N 41°26′56″E
- Country: Turkey
- Province: Artvin
- District: Hopa
- Municipality: Hopa
- Population (2021): 483
- Time zone: UTC+3 (TRT)

Cumhuriyet (Laz language: Mshke) is a neighbourhood of the town Hopa, Hopa District, Artvin Province, Turkey. Its population is 483 (2021). Most inhabitants of the neighbourhood are ethnically Laz.
