= Hemşin River =

Water stream in Rize province, Turkey

Coordinates: 41°10′57″N 40°53′22″E

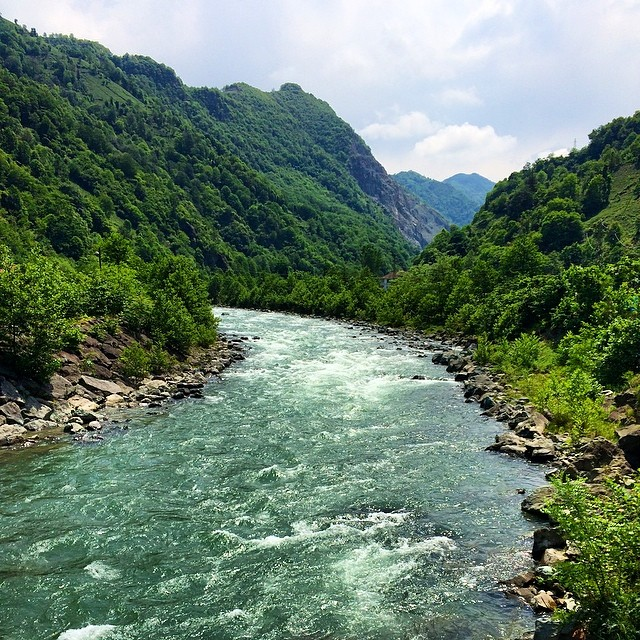

Hemşin River or Pazar River (Laz language: Zuğa River) is one of the main water streams of Hemşin and Pazar districts in the eastern Black Sea Region of Turkey.

== Description ==
Hemşin River rises in Gito Highlands in Hemşin. The Hemşin River is 38.5 kilometres (23.9 mi) long. It is a popular place for amateur handline fishing.
