= Farqad Sabakhi =

Armenian Islamic preacher (died 729)

Saint Farqad Sabakhi

Preacher, Mystic, Theologian
- Born: c. 650-70 C.E. Armenia
- Died: c. 729/30 C.E.
- Venerated in: Islam
- Influenced: Maruf Karkhi
- Tradition or genre: Ascetic Sufism

Farqad Sabakhi (died 729) was an Armenian Islamic preacher and an associate of Hasan al-Basri. He was thus one of the Tabi'een (i.e. of the generation that succeeded the Sahabah). Farqad as-Sabakhi was a Christian who converted to Islam. As-Sabakhi was known for his ascetic lifestyle and his knowledge of Jewish and Christian scriptures.

Fuqayyim ibn Ya'qub al-Subkhi was a Muslim ascetic and preacher from Basra. He is known for a number of his sayings, including:

"I read in the Torah: 'He who wakes up sad about the world is angry with his Lord, the Exalted.' 'He who sits with a rich man and humbles himself before him loses two-thirds of his religion.' 'He who is afflicted with a calamity and complains to people is only complaining to his Lord, the Exalted.'" "The kings of the Children of Israel killed their readers of the Torah because of religion, while your kings kill you because of the world. So leave them and the world alone."

== See also ==
- Sufism
- Islam in Armenia
