= Yukarı Kuledibi =

- Neighbourhood
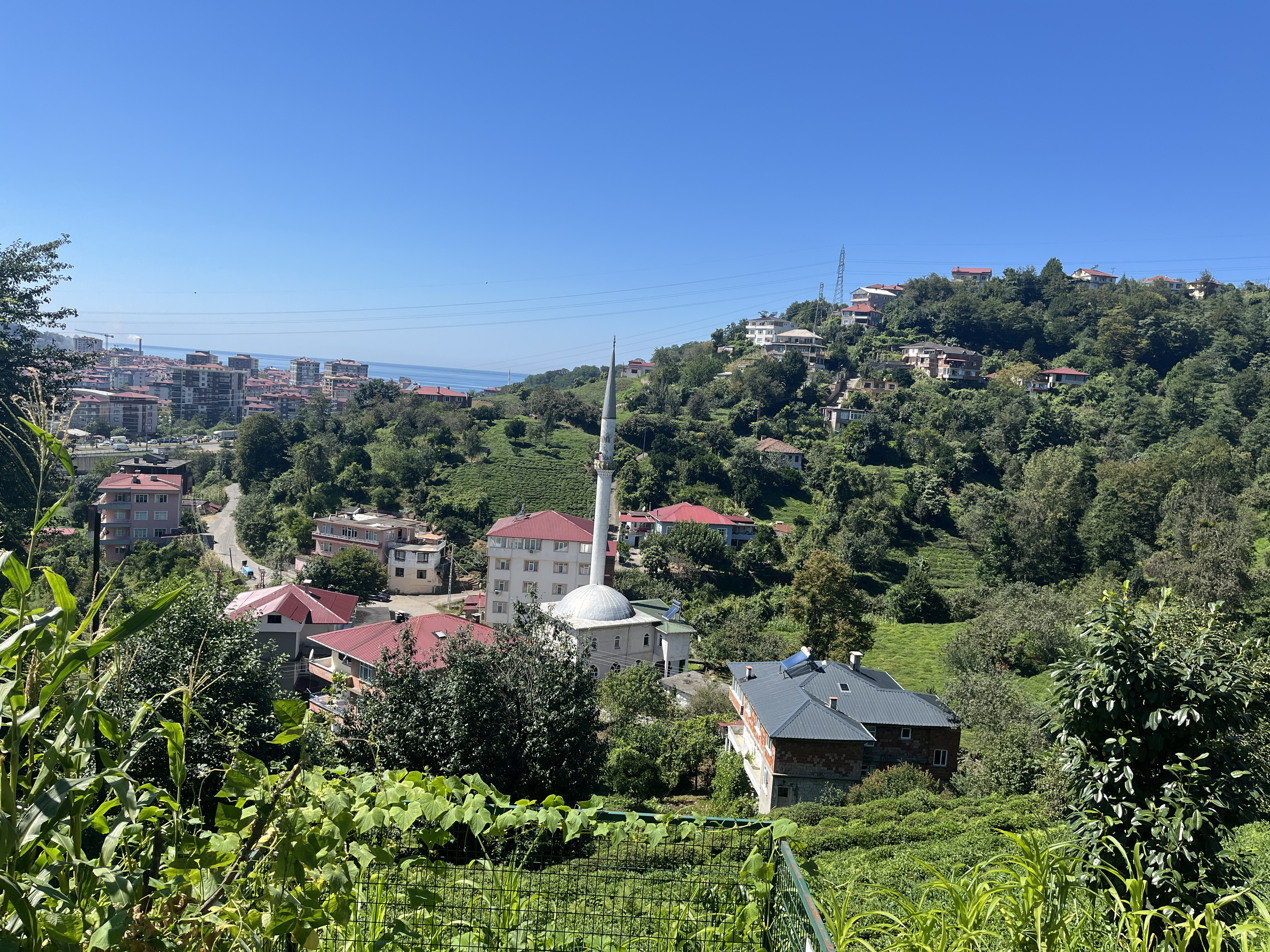

- Location within Turkey
- Coordinates: 41°24′10″N 41°27′9″E
- Country: Turkey
- Province: Artvin
- District: Hopa
- Municipality: Hopa
- Population (2021): 505
- Time zone: UTC+3 (TRT)

Yukarı Kuledibi is a neighbourhood of the town Hopa, Hopa District, Artvin Province, Turkey. Its population is 505 (2021). Most inhabitants of the neighbourhood are ethnically Laz.
