= Bazmaberd =

Bazmaberd may refer to:

- Nerkin Bazmaberd, Armenia
- Verin Bazmaberd, Armenia
