= Hemşin District =

District of Rize Province, Turkey

- District
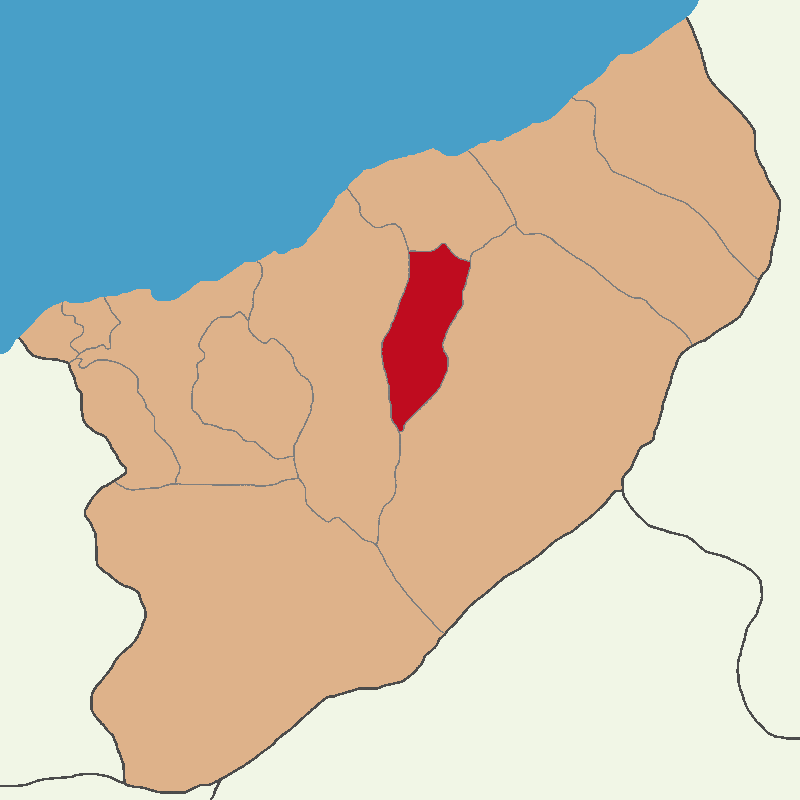
- Map showing Hemşin District in Rize Province

- Location in Turkey
- Coordinates: 41°03′N 40°54′E
- Country: Turkey
- Province: Rize
- Seat: Hemşin

Government
  - Kaymakam: Muhammed Akın
- Area: 134 km^{2} (52 sq mi)
- Population (2021): 2,482
  - Density: 18.5/km^{2} (48.0/sq mi)
- Time zone: UTC+3 (TRT)
- Website: www.hemsin.gov.tr

Hemşin District is a district of the Rize Province of Turkey. Its seat is the town of Hemşin. Its area is 134 km^{2}, and its population is 2,482 (2021).

Hemşin is a district of green hills about 20 km inland from the Black Sea. The area is the ethnic homeland of the Hemshin peoples of Turkey, known for their tradition of tea cultivation, honey, hazelnuts, traditional dress and song.

== Composition ==
There is one municipality in Hemşin District:

- Hemşin

There are 8 villages in Hemşin District:

- Akyamaç
- Bilenköy
- Çamlıtepe
- Hilal
- Kantarlı
- Leventköy
- Nurluca
- Yaltkaya
