= Yerkramas =

- Type: Daily newspaper
- Format: Broadsheet
- Owner: Tribune Company
- Editor: Tigran Tavadyan
- Founded: 1996
- Language: Russian, Armenian
- Headquarters: 49 Suvorov St, Krasnodar; Krasnodar, Russia 35006390012
- Circulation: 17,000
- Price: Mon.-Sat. $1 & Sunday/Thanksgiving Day $2
- Website: www.yerkramas.org

Yerkramas (Russian: Еркрамас; Armenian: Երկրամաս) is an Armenian newspaper published in Krasnodar, Russia.
