= Sasunashen =

Sasunashen or Karakoymaz may refer to:

- Nerkin Sasunashen, Armenia
- Verin Sasunashen, Armenia
