= İkizdere District =

District of Rize Province, Turkey

- District
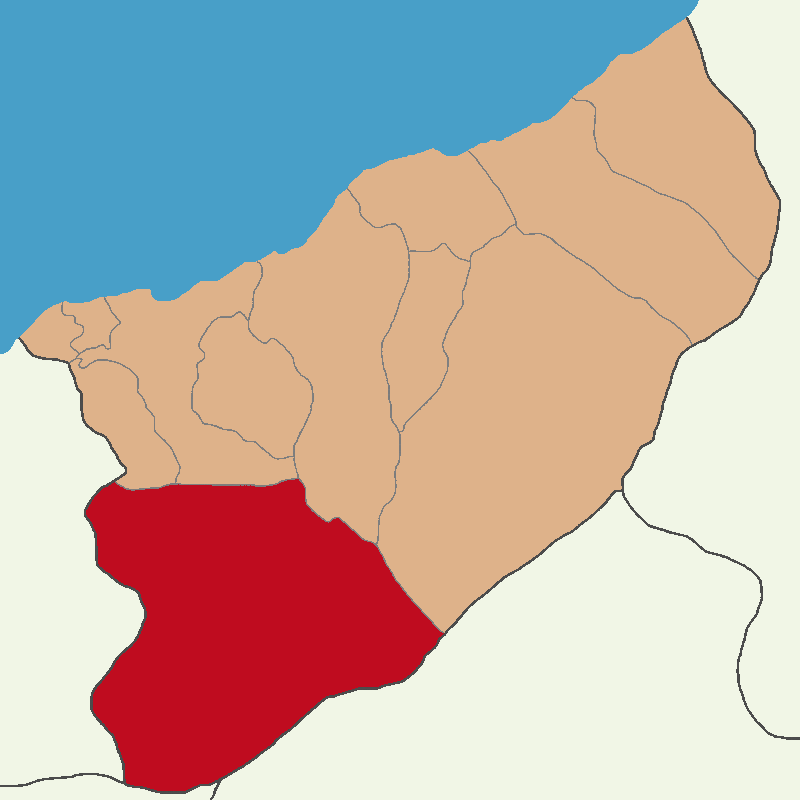
- Map showing İkizdere District in Rize Province

- Location in Turkey
- Coordinates: 40°43′N 40°37′E
- Country: Turkey
- Province: Rize
- Seat: İkizdere

Government
  - Kaymakam: Mustafa Salih Bayram
- Area: 855 km^{2} (330 sq mi)
- Population (2021): 6,409
  - Density: 7.5/km^{2} (19/sq mi)
- Time zone: UTC+3 (TRT)
- Website: www.ikizdere.gov.tr

İkizdere District is a district of the Rize Province of Turkey. Its seat is the town of İkizdere. Its area is 855 km^{2}, and its population is 6,409 (2021).

== Composition ==
There is one municipality in İkizdere District:

- İkizdere

There are 29 villages in İkizdere District:

- Ayvalık (Kapse)
- Ballıköy (Anzer)
- Başköy
- Bayırköy (Kolyav)
- Çamlıkköy
- Çataltepe
- Cevizlik (Plakorum)
- Çiçekli
- Çifteköprü
- Demirkapı (Homeze)
- Dereköy
- Diktaş (İksenit)
- Eskice (Haya)
- Gölyayla (Kabahor)
- Güneyce (Varda)
- Gürdere (Etmone)
- Güvenköy
- Ihlamur
- Ilıcaköy (Vane)
- Kama
- Meşeköy (Petran)
- Ortaköy (Cimil)
- Rüzgarlı (Mize)
- Sivrikaya (Köhser)
- Şimşirli (Gomes)
- Tozköy (Mahura)
- Tulumpınar
- Yağcılar (Vilköy)
- Yerelma (Cavatoz)
