= Mardistan =

Historic district of Armenia

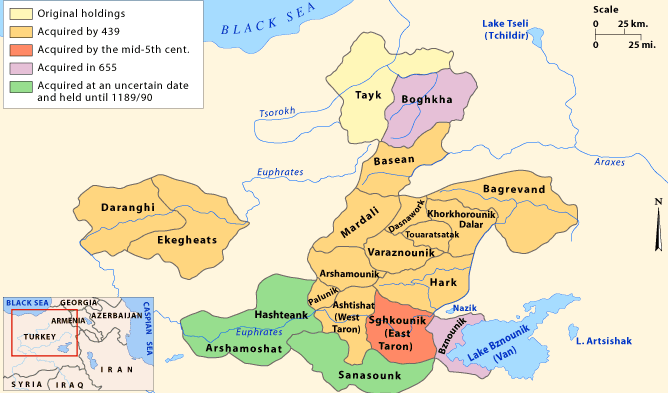
Map showing Mardali i.e. Mardistan within the jurisdiction of the house of Mamikonian

The district of Mardistan, in historic Armenia corresponds to Artaz, the origin of the Amatuni. The district of Mardali (Mardaghi) must have been located to the south of Erzurum, north of the Bingöl sources. The Mards of this section of the country were evidently immigrants from the South, says Nicholas Adontz.
