= Hopa =

- Municipality
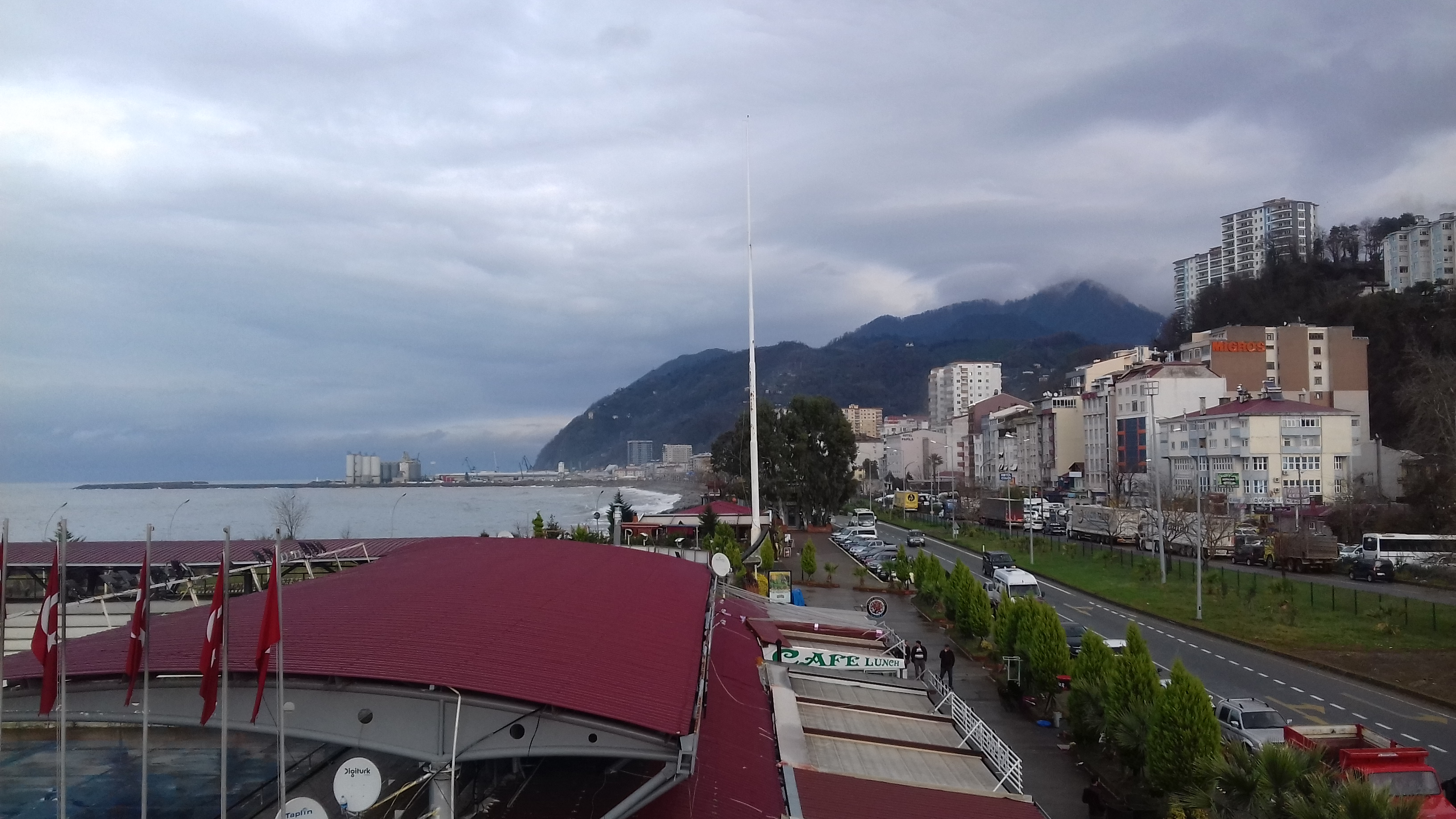

- Logo

- Location within Turkey
- Coordinates: 41°23′25″N 41°25′10″E
- Country: Turkey
- Province: Artvin
- District: Hopa

Government
  - Mayor: Utku Cihan (CHP)
- Population (2021): 23,846
- Time zone: UTC+3 (TRT)
- Postal code: 08600
- Climate: Cfa
- Website: www.hopa.bel.tr

Hopa (Laz and Georgian: ხოფა, romanized: khopa) is a town in Artvin Province in northeast Turkey. It is located on the eastern Black Sea coast about 67 km (42 mi) from the city of Artvin and 18 kilometres from the Georgia–Turkey border. It is the seat of Hopa District. Its population is 23,846 (2021).

== Geography ==
Hopa is on the Black Sea coast, 65 km (40 mi) from Artvin and 18 km (11 mi) from the Sarp border crossing into Georgia. The land climbs sharply from 10m above sea level in the coastal areas up into the Sultan Selim Mountains, the hillsides are well watered and green with alder, chestnuts, hornbeams and other deciduous trees. The highest point is Mt Yavuz Sultan Selim at 1513m. The climate is mild and wet, although only July and August are warm enough to be called summer. There is annual snowfall in winter.

The town consists of 7 quarters: Bucak, Merkez Kuledibi, Ortahopa, Sundura, Yukarı Kuledibi, Cumhuriyet and Sugören.

== History ==
The area was part of the kingdom of Colchis but was always vulnerable to invasions, first the Scythians from across the Caucasus, then the Muslim armies led by Habib, son of Caliph Uthman who controlled the area from 853 AD to 1023 when it was conquered by the Byzantines from the Sac Emirate allied to the Abbasids. The Seljuk Turks led by Alp Arslan conquered the area in 1064. With the collapse of the Seljuks, the Artvin area came under the control of the Ildeniz, one of the Anatolian Turkish beyliks

Ottoman Sultan Selim I brought it into the Ottoman Empire during his campaign against the Crimea that took place in 1490–1512. Lala Mustafa Pasha made it part of the Childir Eyalet formed in 1578. The area was captured by Russia following the Russo-Turkish War (1877-1878) and many people of Hopa moved westwards away from the Russian-controlled zone. Hopa was returned as part of the Treaty of Brest Litovsk in 1918 and formally joined Turkey on 14 March 1921. The Sarp border gate was opened on 31 August 1988 with the "International Road Transport Agreement" between Soviet Union and Turkey and gave a big boost to Hopa in trade and tourism.

There is currently a high rate of cancer in Hopa, attributed to fall-out from the Chernobyl disaster, across the Black Sea. Between 2001 and 2004, cancer cases sharply increased in the Black Sea region, especially in Hopa, with 47.9% of all deaths during this time being due to cancer.

== Economy ==
The economy is based on trade, fishing and agriculture, mostly tea, nuts (especially hazelnuts) and kiwifruit. There are two tea factories, the Black Sea Copper Works, a thermal power plant, the Hopa port and the Hopa Vocational School. It has direct bus connections to Trabzon, Rize, Artvin, Ardahan, Kars, Erzurum and Sarp in Georgia. The Sarp border gate was opened on 31 August 1988 with the "International Road Transport Agreement" between the Soviet Union and Turkey and gave a boost to trade and tourism in Hopa. The Hopa port is managed by the privately owned company Hopa Limani and is active in international trade.

== Notable people ==
- Cemil Aksu (born 1977), Hemshin political and social activist
- Özcan Alper, Director
- Adem Büyük (born 1987), footballer
- Kazım Koyuncu (1971–2005), rock guitarist and singer
- Tolga Zengin (born 1983), footballer

== Climate ==
The area is characterized by an equable climate with few extremes and ample precipitation in all months. Hopa has a humid subtropical climate (Köppen: Cfa).

Climate data for Hopa (1991–2020)
Month	Jan	Feb	Mar	Apr	May	Jun	Jul	Aug	Sep	Oct	Nov	Dec	Year
Mean daily maximum °C (°F)	11.2 (52.2)	11.7 (53.1)	14.0 (57.2)	17.2 (63.0)	20.9 (69.6)	25.2 (77.4)	27.3 (81.1)	28.0 (82.4)	25.2 (77.4)	21.5 (70.7)	16.7 (62.1)	13.2 (55.8)	19.4 (66.9)
Daily mean °C (°F)	7.4 (45.3)	7.4 (45.3)	9.3 (48.7)	12.2 (54.0)	16.6 (61.9)	20.9 (69.6)	23.4 (74.1)	24.0 (75.2)	20.6 (69.1)	16.8 (62.2)	12.1 (53.8)	9.4 (48.9)	15.1 (59.2)
Mean daily minimum °C (°F)	3.8 (38.8)	3.5 (38.3)	5.1 (41.2)	8.0 (46.4)	12.5 (54.5)	16.8 (62.2)	19.8 (67.6)	20.6 (69.1)	16.8 (62.2)	13.0 (55.4)	8.1 (46.6)	5.7 (42.3)	11.2 (52.2)
Average precipitation mm (inches)	199.06 (7.84)	168.36 (6.63)	155.66 (6.13)	92.87 (3.66)	97.66 (3.84)	154.49 (6.08)	154.43 (6.08)	179.98 (7.09)	316.78 (12.47)	317.1 (12.48)	264.93 (10.43)	239.94 (9.45)	2,341.26 (92.18)
Average precipitation days (≥ 1.0 mm)	12.9	12.4	13.6	10.6	10.2	10.9	10.8	10.9	11.6	12.2	11.2	12.5	139.8
Average relative humidity (%)	66.7	69.9	73.0	76.7	79.6	79.1	79.8	80.3	79.4	79.0	70.9	64.1	74.9
Source: NOAA

== See also ==
- Selimiye Tunnel
