= Hemşin =

Hemşin Hamshen • Համշեն
- Municipality
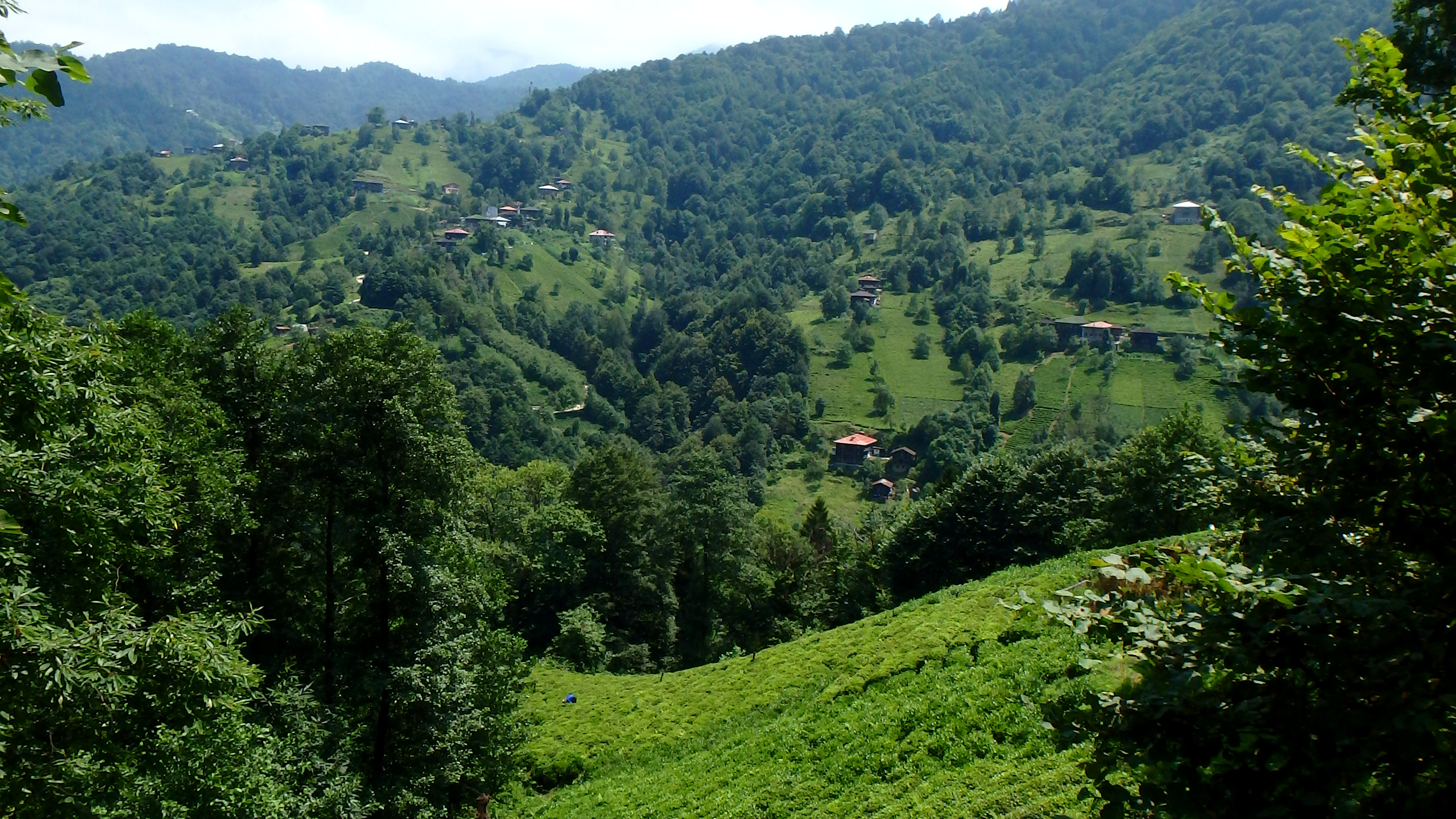

- Location within Turkey
- Coordinates: 41°03′01″N 40°54′06″E
- Country: Turkey
- Province: Rize
- District: Hemşin

Government
  - Mayor: Halim Kazım Bekar (AKP)
- Population (2021): 1,472
- Time zone: UTC+3 (TRT)
- Postal code: 53550
- Climate: Cfb
- Website: www.hemsin.bel.tr

Hemşin (Armenian: Համշէն Hamshen or Համամաշէն Hamamashen, literally "Hamam's Hamlet"; Laz and Georgian: ზუგა Zuga), is a town in Rize Province in the Black Sea region of Turkey, 57 km from the city of Rize. It is the seat of Hemşin District. Its population is 1,472 (2021).

== History ==
As part of the Rize province, Hemshin had been a refuge for some Cimmerians and was a site of early Greek settlements and once part of the Roman Empire and the succeeding Byzantine Empire.

In the 8th century, Armenian Prince Hamam, his father Prince Shapuh Amatuni, and their people migrated north to the Black Sea region in order to escape Arab invasions of Vaspurakan. They settled in the ruined city of Tambur and its surrounding villages. Prince Hamam rebuilt the city and named it Hamamshen ("Hamam's hamlet" in Armenian), this becoming the nucleus of the modern district.

This Principality of Hamamshen existed until the 14th century, when it was conquered by the Ottoman Empire.

== Demographics ==
The Hemshin peoples (Armenian: Համշէնցիներ, Hamshentsiner; Turkish: Hemşinliler) are a diverse group of peoples who in the past or present have been affiliated with the region.

== Climate ==
Hemşin has an oceanic climate (Köppen: Cfb).

Climate data for Hemşin
| Month | Jan | Feb | Mar | Apr | May | Jun | Jul | Aug | Sep | Oct | Nov | Dec | Year |
|---|---|---|---|---|---|---|---|---|---|---|---|---|---|
| Daily mean °C (°F) | 3.7 (38.7) | 4.4 (39.9) | 6.4 (43.5) | 10.8 (51.4) | 14.6 (58.3) | 18.4 (65.1) | 21.2 (70.2) | 21.3 (70.3) | 18.5 (65.3) | 14.2 (57.6) | 9.9 (49.8) | 6.0 (42.8) | 12.5 (54.5) |
| Average precipitation mm (inches) | 139 (5.5) | 107 (4.2) | 94 (3.7) | 77 (3.0) | 78 (3.1) | 109 (4.3) | 86 (3.4) | 106 (4.2) | 136 (5.4) | 174 (6.9) | 156 (6.1) | 161 (6.3) | 1,423 (56.1) |
Source: Climate-Data.org

== See also ==
- Hemshin peoples
- Amatuni
- Çamlıhemşin
- Principality of Hamamshen
