= Homshetsi dialect =

Armenian dialect

Homshetsi
- Homshetsma
- Հոմշեցի / Հոմշեցմա
- Native to: Armenian Highlands, Anatolia, Georgia
- Ethnicity: Hemshin people
- Native speakers: (undated figure of 150,000)
- Language family: Indo-European: Armenian; Western; Homshetsi
- Writing system: Armenian alphabet, modified Turkish alphabet

Language codes
- ISO 639-3: (included in Western Armenian hyw)
- Glottolog: homs1234
- ELP: Homshetsi
- Homshetsi is classified as Severely Endangered by the UNESCO Atlas of the World's Languages in Danger (2010)

Homshetsi (Armenian: Հոմշեցի, romanized: Homshetsi lizu; Turkish: Hemşince) is an archaic Armenian dialect or a language spoken by the eastern and northern group of Hemshin peoples (Hemşinli), a people living in northeastern Turkey, Abkhazia, Russia, and Central Asia.

It has some differences from Armenian spoken in Armenia. It was not a written language until 1995, when linguist Bert Vaux designed an orthographic system for it based on the Turkish alphabet; the Armenian alphabet was used by Christian immigrants from Hamshen (Northern Hamshenis)—who refer to the language as Homshetsma (Հոմշեցմա) in Russia and Abkhazia.

Homshetsi is a spoken language amongst the Eastern Hemshinli, also known as the Hopa Hemshinli, who live in a small number of villages in Turkey's Artvin Province and Central Asia. The Western or Rize Hamsheni are a related, geographically separate group living in Rize Province, who spoke Homshetsi until sometime in the 19th century. They now speak only Turkish with many Homshetsi loanwords. A third group, the northern Homshentsik, who live in Russia, Georgia (Abkhazia), Armenia, also speak Homshetsi.

Homshetsi has linguistic features that indicate it belongs to the Western Armenian dialect group; however, the two are generally not mutually intelligible. Homshetsi has close ties to the Armenian dialects formerly found in northeastern Turkey, in particular in Khodorchur and, to a lesser extent, in Trabzon. Because of its extended isolation, Homshetsi contains many archaisms that set it apart from all other Armenian dialects. The language preserves forms found only in Classical and Middle Armenian, and at the same time preserves foreign (especially Arabic and Turkish) grammatical and lexical components that were stripped from modern Armenian during the twentieth century.

UNESCO has categorised Homshetsi as a language that is "Severely endangered".
