= İkizdere =

- Municipality
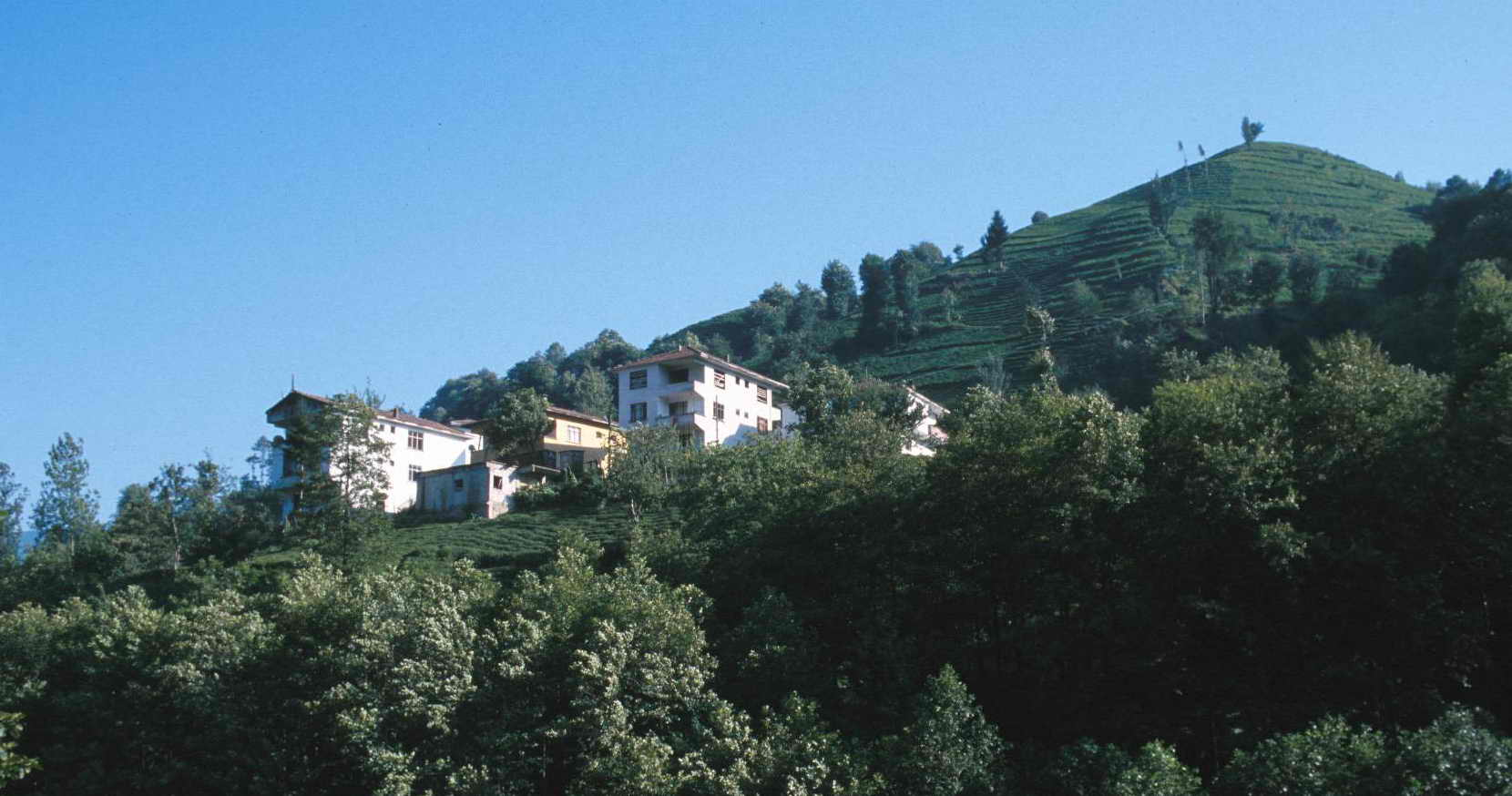
- Tea plantations on the slopes of Rize (İkizdere valley).

- Location within Turkey
- Coordinates: 40°42′37″N 40°36′55″E
- Country: Turkey
- Province: Rize
- District: İkizdere

Government
  - Mayor: Abdi Ekşi (AKP)
- Elevation: 570 m (1,870 ft)
- Population (2021): 1,875
- Time zone: UTC+3 (TRT)
- Postal code: 53650
- Area code: 0464
- Climate: Cfb
- Website: ikizdere.bel.tr

İkizdere (Laz: Xuras) is a town in Rize Province in the Black Sea region of Turkey. It is the seat of İkizdere District. Its population is 1,875 (2021).
