= List of titles =

List of personal titles

This is a list of personal titles arranged in a sortable table.

Title	Origin	Function	Usual Source of Authority	Usual Breadth of Authority
Ab Actis	Belgian	Executive	Elected or Appointed	Institutional (student society)
Abbess or Abbot	Latin	Executive	Elected	Institutional (abbey)
Admiral of the Fleet	European	Executive	Appointed	Divisional (highest naval rank)
Agha	Kurdish, Turkish, Persian	Administrative	Identified or Appointed (Debatable)	Tribal
Aesymnetes	Greek	Executive	Elected	National
Agonothetes	Greek	Administrative	Elected	Institutional (sacred games)
Agoranomos	Greek	Executive	Elected	Institutional (marketplace)
Air Marshal	British	Administrative	Appointed	Divisional (very senior air force rank)
Aircraftman	British	Administrative	Appointed	Divisional (lowest air force rank)
Akhoond	Persian	Ceremonial	Appointed/ identified?	Institutional (mosque)
Alcalde	Spanish	Executive	Elected	The mayor of town/city
Alderman	Old English	Administrative/executive	Elected	An elected member of a city council
Allamah	Arabic	Ceremonial	Identified	Personal
Amban	Manchu	Executive/ legislative	Appointed	Provincial/ supranational
Amir al-Mu'minin	Arabic	Executive	Hereditary/ identified	National/ supranational/ tribal
Amphipole	Greek	Executive/ judicial	Elected?	National
Anax	Greek	Executive	Hereditary	Supranational
Apodektai	Greek	Administrative	Appointed	Tribal
Apostle	Greek	Ceremonial	Appointed/ Identified	Personal/ supernatural
Arahant	Pali	Ceremonial	Identified	Personal/ supernatural
Archbishop	Greek	Executive/ judicial	Appointed	Provincial (diocesan)
Archdeacon	Christian	Administrative	Appointed	Institutional (local church)
Archduchess or Archduke	German	Ceremonial/ executive	Hereditary	Courtly/ supranational
Archiater	Greek	Administrative/ executive	Appointed	Institutional (court (royal))
Archimandrite	Greek	Ceremonial/ executive	Appointed	Institutional (abbey)
Archon	Greek	Executive/ judicial	Elected	Local/ national
Archpriest	Christian	Administrative	Appointed	Provincial
Argbadh	Persian	Executive	Appointed	Institutional (castle)
Arhat	Sanskrit	Ceremonial	Identified	Personal/ supernatural
Asapatish	Persian	Executive	Appointed	Divisional (cavalry unit)
Aspet	Armenian	Executive	Hereditary	Courtly
Assistant in Virtue	Tang dynasty	Ceremonial	Appointed	Courtly
Assistant Professor	American	Administrative	Appointed	Institutional (university)
Assistant to the President & Deputy National Security Advisor	American	Executive	Appointed	National
Associate Professor	American	Administrative	Appointed	Institutional (university)
Aswaran Salar	Sasanian Empire	Executive	Appointed	Divisional (entire cavalry)
Augusta	Greek	Ceremonial	Appointed	Courtly
Ayatollah	Persian	Judicial	Appointed (based on studies at a hawza)	Personal
Baivarapatish	Persian	Executive	Appointed	Divisional (baivarabam of 10,000 soldiers)
Bapu	Hindi	Ceremonial	Identified	Courtly/ personal
Baron or Baroness	French	Executive	Hereditary	Local
Basileus or Basilissa	Anatolian	Executive/ ceremonial/ judicial	Hereditary/elected	National
Beauty	Tang dynasty	Ceremonial	Appointed	Courtly
Bishop	Christian	Executive	Appointed	Provincial (diocesan)
Blessed	Latin	Ceremonial	Appointed	Supernatural
Begum	Turkish	Ceremonial	Appointed	Courtly/ personal
Brother	Christian	Personal	Identified	Personal
Buddha	Pali/ Sanskrit	Ceremonial	Identified	Personal/ supernatural
Cardinal	Christian	Administrative	Appointed	Institutional (College of Cardinals)
Cardinal-nephew	Latin	Administrative	Appointed	Institutional (College of Cardinals)
Caesar	Latin	Ceremonial	Appointed	Courtly
Caliph	Arabic	Executive	Elected/hereditary	Supranational
Cantor	Belgian	Executive	Elected or Appointed	Institutional (student society)
Captain (land)	European	Executive	Appointed	Divisional (75- 200 soldiers)
Captain (naval)	English	Executive	Appointed	Divisional (large ship)
Catholicos	Greek	Executive	Appointed	Regional
Centurion	Latin	Executive	Appointed	Divisional (80 or more soldiers)
Chairman or Chairwoman	English	Administrative/ executive/ legislative	Appointed/ elected	Institutional (Meeting)
Chakravartin	Sanskrit	Executive	Identified/ hereditary	Supranational
Chancellor	Latin	Administrative	Appointed	Courtly
Chanyu	Xiongnu	Executive	Hereditary	Tribal
Chhatrapati	Marathi	Executive	Hereditary	National/ supranational
Chief or Chieftain	Global	Executive/ judicial/ legislative	Elected/ hereditary	Tribal
Chiliarch	Greek	Executive	Appointed	Divisional (1,000 soldiers)
Chorbishop	Greek	Executive	Appointed	Provincial (diocesan)
Choregos	Greek	Administrative/ ceremonial	Purchased	Institutional (theatre festival)
City Manager	English	Executive	Appointed	Local
Coiffure Attendant	Tang dynasty	Ceremonial	Appointed	Courtly
Colonel	English	Honorific	Appointed/Identified	Local
Comes	Latin	Ceremonial	Appointed/ identified	Courtly/ supernatural
Commissioner	English	Executive/Legislative	Elected/Appointed	Local
Commissioner of Baseball	Amero-Canadian	Executive	Elected	Institutional (Major League Baseball)
Concubinus	Roman	Ceremonial	Appointed	Personal
Consort	Tang dynasty	Ceremonial	Appointed	Courtly
Consul	Roman	Executive/ judicial	Elected	National
Corporal	Italian	Executive	Appointed	Divisional (2nd in command of a squad of 8 to 14 soldiers)
Corrector	Latin	Executive/ judicial	Appointed	Regional
Councillor	Latin	Legislative	Elected	Local
Count or Countess	Latin	Executive	Hereditary	Provincial
Dàifu (Great Man)	Chinese	Ceremonial	Identified	Personal
Dalai Lama	Tibetan	Ceremonial	Appointed	Supranational
Dame or Dom	Latin	Ceremonial	Appointed/ identified	Institutional (British knighthood, English Benedictine Congregation)
Dathapatish	Persian	Executive	Appointed	Divisional (dathabam of 10 soldiers)
Deacon or Diakonissa	Greek	Administrative	Appointed	Institutional (local church)
Dean (religion)	Christian	Administrative	Appointed	Institutional (local church)
Decurio	Roman	Executive	Appointed	Divisional (command of a ''contubernium'' of 8 soldiers)
Desai	Indo-Aryan	Administrative	Appointed/ hereditary	Provincial
Despot	Greek	Ceremonial	Appointed	Courtly
Dilochitès	Greek	Executive	Appointed	Divisional (dilochia army double file)
Dikastes	Greek	Judicial	Chosen by lot	Tribal
Dimoirites	Greek	Executive	Appointed	Divisional (dimoiria army half file)
Distinguished Professor	American	Administrative	Appointed	Institutional (university)
Divine Adoratrice	Egyptian	Executive/ ceremonial	Hereditary	National
Diwan	Persian	Executive	Appointed/ hereditary	National/ provincial
Doctor	European	Administrative	Appointed	Institutional (university)
Don or Doña	Spanish	Ceremonial/ executive	Identified	Local/ national
Duchess or Duke	Latin	Executive	Hereditary	National/ Regional
Dux	Latin	Executive	Appointed	Divisional (two legions- 9,000 soldiers or more)
Earl or Countess	Anglo-Saxon	Executive	Hereditary	Provincial
Earl Marshal	English	Administrative/ judicial	Hereditary	Courtly/ national
Ecumenical Patriarch	Greek	Ceremonial/ judicial	Elected?	Supranational
Elder	Anglo-Saxon, Arabic, Australian, Germanic, Greek, Latin, Mayan, Slavic, Latter-day Saint	Legislative	Elected/ Appointed	Tribal, Institutional (Latter-day Saint Movement)
Emeritus	Latin	Ceremonial	Retired from office	Various, a retired chair, professor, or other person who retains an honorary title. Used as suffix, e.g. Professor Emeritus
Emperor or Empress	Latin	Executive	Hereditary	Supranational
En	Sumerian	Ceremonial/ executive	Hereditary?	Local/ national
Ephor	Greek	Executive	Elected	National
Epihipparch	Greek	Executive	Appointed	Divisional (1,000 horses)
Esquire or Squire	French	Administrative/ executive/ judicial/ legislative	Appointed/ hereditary	Local/ personal
Evangelist	Christian	Administrative	Appointed	Institutional (Latter Day Saint movement)
Exarch	Greek	Executive	Appointed	Provincial
Fan-bearer on the Right Side of the King	Egyptian	Ceremonial	Appointed	Courtly
Faqih	Arabic	Judicial	Appointed	Institutional (Sharia)
Fellow	English	Administrative	Appointed	Institutional (university)
Fidalgo	Portuguese	Executive	Hereditary	Provincial
Fidei defensor	Latin	Ceremonial	Appointed/ hereditary	National
Field Marshal	German	Executive	Appointed	Divisional (highest army rank)
Foreign minister	European	Administrative	Appointed	Diplomatic
Furén (High-Ranking Madam)	Chinese	Ceremonial	Identified	Personal
Fürst or Fürstin	German	Executive	Hereditary	Provincial
Ganden Tripa	Tibetan	Ceremonial	Appointed	Institutional (Gelug sect)
Generalissimo	Italian	Executive	Elected (by fellow military commanders)	National
God's Wife	Egyptian	Ceremonial	Appointed	Institutional (cult of Amun)
Gong or Gong Bao (Lord)	Chinese	Ceremonial/ executive	Appointed/ identified	Provincial/ supernatural
Goodman or Goodwife	British	Ceremonial	Identified	Personal
Gothi or Gyoja	Old Norse	Ceremonial/ executive	Elected?	Tribal
Governor	Roman	Executive	Appointed/ elected	Provincial
Governor-General	European	Executive	Appointed	National/ regional
Grand Admiral	French	Executive	Appointed	Divisional (highest naval rank)
Grand duchess or Grand duke	Germanic	Executive	Hereditary	National
Grand Inquisitor	Latin	Judicial	Appointed	National/ supranational
Grand Master	European	Ceremonial/ executive	Identified	Institutional (Freemasonry, Knights Hospitaller, Knights Templar, Teutonic Knights)/ supranational
Grand Master (GM)	European	Ceremonial	Appointed	Institutional (FIDE)
International Master (IM)	European	Ceremonial	Appointed	Institutional (FIDE)
FIDE Master (FM)	European	Ceremonial	Appointed	Institutional (FIDE)
Candidate Master (CM)	European	Ceremonial	Appointed	Institutional (FIDE)
Grand prince	Latin	Executive	Hereditary	National
Guardian Immortal	Tang dynasty	Ceremonial	Appointed	Courtly
Hadrat	Arabic	Ceremonial	Identified	Personal
Handsome Fairness	Tang dynasty	Ceremonial	Appointed	Courtly
Haty-a	Egyptian	Executive	Appointed?	Local
Hazarapatish	Persian	Executive	Appointed	Divisional (hazarabam of 1,000 soldiers)
Headman	Zuni & !Kung people amongst others	Ceremonial	Identified	Personal
Hegumen or Hegumenia	Greek	Executive	Appointed	Institutional (abbey)
Hekatontarchès	Greek	Executive	Appointed	Divisional (100 soldiers)
Hellenotamiae	Greek	Administrative	Elected?	Tribal
Hetman	Ukrainian	Military	Army ranking	
Herald	European	Administrative/ diplomatic	Appointed	Institutional/ national
Her/His/Your Excellency	English	Ceremonial/ executive	Appointed/ elected/ hereditary	Diplomatic/ national
Her/ His/ Your Grace	British	Executive/ legislative	Hereditary	Regional
Her/ His/ Your Highness	European	Ceremonial	Hereditary	Courtly
Her/ His/ Your Illustrious Highness	European	Ceremonial	Hereditary	Provincial
Her/ His/ Your Imperial Highness	European	Ceremonial	Hereditary	Courtly
Her/His/Your Imperial Majesty	European	Executive	Hereditary	Supranational
Her/Your Ladyship or His/Your Lordship	British	Executive/ legislative/ judicial	Hereditary	Provincial
Her/ His/ Your Majesty	European	Executive	Hereditary	National
Her/ His/ Your Royal Highness	European	Ceremonial	Hereditary	Courtly
Her/ His/ Your Serene Highness	European	Executive	Hereditary	National
Herzog	German	Executive	Hereditary	Regional
Hidalgo	Spanish	Executive/ legislative	Appointed/ hereditary	Provincial
Hierodeacon	Greek	Administrative	Appointed	Institutional (local church)
Hieromonk	Greek	Administrative	Appointed	Institutional (monastery)
Hierophant	Greek	Ceremonial	Appointed?	Institutional (Eleusinian Mysteries)
High priest or High priestess	Christian, Jewish, Pagan, Samaritan, Santería, Shinto	Ceremonial	Appointed	Institutional (temple)
Hipparchus (cavalry officer)	Greek	Executive	Appointed	Divisional (hipparchia of 500 horsemen)
His Eminence	Christian	Executive/ administrative	Appointed/ elected	National/ supranational
Hojatoleslam	Arabic	Ceremonial	Appointed	Personal
Ilarchès	Greek	Executive	Appointed	Divisional (wing cavalry unit)
Imam	Arabic	Ceremonial	Identified	Institutional (mosque)/ supernatural
Imperator or Imperatrice	Latin	Executive	Identified	Divisional (legion of about 4,500 soldiers)
Inquisitor	Latin	Judicial	Appointed	Supranational
Jagirdar	Indian	Executive	Appointed	Provincial
Jiàoshòu (Instructor)	Chinese	Administrative	Identified	Institutional (university)
Junior Technician	British	Administrative	Appointed	Divisional (non-supervisory)
Kanstresios	Greek	Administrative	Appointed	Institutional (office of the Ecumenical Patriarch of Constantinople)
Karo	Japanese	Administrative	Appointed	Institutional (Castle)
Khan or Cham	Central Asian	Executive	Hereditary	National/Supranational
Khawaja	Arabic	Ceremonial	Hereditary/ identified	Tribal
King or Queen	English	Executive	Hereditary	National
King of Arms	European	Ceremonial	Appointed	National
Kolakretai	Greek	Administrative	Appointed	Local
Kumar or Kumari	Sanskrit	Ceremonial	Appointed/ hereditary	National/ provincial
Lady or Lord	British	Executive	Hereditary / identified	Peerage of the United Kingdom) / Provincial
Lady of His Majesty	Tang dynasty	Ceremonial	Appointed	Courtly
Lady of Treasure	Tang dynasty	Ceremonial	Appointed	Courtly
Laoshi (Old Master)	Chinese	Executive/ judicial/ legislative	Identified	Personal
Leading Aircraftman or Leading Aircraftwoman	British	Administrative	Appointed	Divisional (non-supervisory)
Lecturer	British	Administrative	Appointed	Institutional (university)
Legatus	Roman	Executive	Appointed	Divisional (top rank)
Lehendakari	Basque	Executive	Elected	President of the Basque Country
Lochagos	Greek	Executive	Appointed	Divisional (75 to 200 soldiers)
Lonko	Mapudungun	Executive	Hereditary?	Tribal
Lord Great Chamberlain	English	Ceremonial	Hereditary	Courtly
Lord High Constable	English	Ceremonial/ executive/ judicial	Hereditary	Courtly
Lord Privy Seal	English	Administrative	Appointed	National
Lugal	Sumerian	Executive	Hereditary	Local/ national
Madam or Sir	French	Ceremonial/ executive	Appointed/ identified	Divisional (knight)/ personal
Magister Officiorum	Latin	Administrative	Appointed	Institutional (palatine secretariat)
Magister Militum	Latin	Executive	Appointed	Divisional (top level)
Maha-kshtrapa	Sanskrit	Executive	Appointed/ hereditary	Regional
Maharaja or Maharani	Sanskrit	Executive	Hereditary	National/ regional
Maharana	Hindi	Executive	Hereditary	National/ regional
Maharao	Hindi	Executive	Hereditary	National/ regional
Mahatma	Sanskrit	Ceremonial	Identified	Personal
Major archbishop	Christian	Executive	Appointed	Provincial (diocesan)
Malik or Malikah	Arabic	Executive/ legislative/ judicial	Hereditary	Local/ national/ supernatural/ tribal
Mandarin	Chinese	Administrative	Appointed (based on Imperial examination)	National
Marzban	Persian	Executive	Appointed	Provincial
Master of the Horse	Roman	Executive	Appointed	Courtly
Master of the Sacred Palace	Christian	Ceremonial	Appointed	Courtly
Mawlawi	Persian	Ceremonial	Identified	Institutional (madrassa)
Mayor	Latin	Executive/ legislative	Elected/ appointed	Local
Metropolitan Bishop	Christian	Executive/ judicial/ legislative	Appointed	Local
Mirza	Persian	Executive	Hereditary	Courtly
Monsignor	French	Ceremonial	Appointed	Courtly
Mullah	Persian	Ceremonial	Identified	Institutional (Sharia)
Naib	Arabic	Executive	Appointed/ elected	Local/ tribal
Nakharar	Armenian	Executive	Hereditary	Local
National Security Advisor	American	Administrative	Appointed	National
Navarch	Greek	Executive	Appointed	Divisional (equivalent to a modern four-star rank)
Nawab	Persian	Executive	Hereditary	Provincial
Nawabzada or Nawabzadi	Persian	Ceremonial	Hereditary	Courtly
Nizam	Persian	Executive	Hereditary	National/ regional
Nobilissimus	Latin	Ceremonial	Appointed	Courtly
Nomarch	Egyptian	Executive	Appointed/ hereditary	Provincial
Nuncio	Latin	Administrative	Appointed	Diplomatic
Nushi (Mistress)	Chinese	Ceremonial	Identified	Personal
Optio	Latin	Executive	Appointed	Divisional (centuria of about 100 soldiers)
Palatine	Latin	Administrative	Appointed	Provincial/ supernational
Pastor	Latin	Ceremonial	Elected	Institutional (local church)
Patriarch	Greek	Executive	Identified	Tribal
Patriarch	Latter Day Saint movement	Administrative/ Ceremonial	Appointed/ Hereditary	Institutional (Latter Day Saint movement)
Patroon	Dutch	Executive	Appointed	Institutional (colonial manor)
Paygan Salarapoo	Persian	Executive	Appointed?	Divisional (entire infantry)
Peace Be Upon Him	Arabic	Ceremonial	Identified	Supernatural
Peshwa	Marathi	Executive	Appointed/ hereditary	Supranational
Pharaoh	Egyptian	Executive	Hereditary	National
Pir or Pirani	Persian	Administrative	Identified	Personal
Polemarch	Greek	Executive	Appointed/ chosen by lot/ elected	National
Pope	Latin	Executive	Elected	National/ supranational
Post Master General	American	Executive	Appointed	National
Praetor	Roman	Executive/ legislative	Elected	National
Praeses	Belgian	Executive	Elected	Institutional (student society)
Presbyter	Greek	Ceremonial/ Executive	Appointed/ Elected	Local
President	Latin	Executive	Elected	Institutional/ national
President of the Church	Latter Day Saint movement	Executive/ Judicial	Appointed	Institutional (Latter Day Saint movement)/ Diplomatic/ Supernatural
President of the Quorum of the Twelve Apostles	Latter Day Saint movement	Executive/ Judicial	Appointed	Institutional (Latter Day Saint movement)/ Diplomatic/ Supernatural
President pro tempore	Latin	legislative	Elected by Senate	state/national
Presiding Bishop	Christian	Executive	Appointed	Institutional (Christianity)
Presiding Patriarch	Christian	Administrative	Hereditary	Institutional (Latter Day Saint movement)
Priest	Christian, Hindu, Jewish, Neopagan, Pagan, Shinto, Zoroastrian	Ceremonial	Appointed	Institutional (temple)
Primate	Latin	Ceremonial/ judicial	Appointed	Courtly/ national
Prime minister	English	Executive/ legislative	Appointed	National
Prince or Princess	Latin	Ceremonial/ executive	Hereditary	National/ Provincial
Princeps	Latin	Executive	Identified	Supranational
Principal Lecturer	British	Administrative	Appointed	Institutional (university)
Prithvi-vallabha	Indian	Executive	Hereditary	Regional
Professor	Latin	Administrative/ ceremonial	Appointed	Institutional (university)
Professor Emeritus	Latin	Ceremonial	Identified	Institutional (university)
Propagator of Deportment	Tang dynasty	Ceremonial	Appointed	Courtly
Prophet of the Restoration	Latter Day Saint movement	Administrative/ Judicial/ Ceremonial	Identified	Institutional (Latter Day Saint movement)/ Supernatural
Protodeacon	Greek	Administrative	Appointed	Institutional (local church)
Proxenos	Greek	Administrative	Purchased	Diplomatic
Prytaneis	Greek	Administrative	Appointed	Local/ tribal
Pursuivant	European	Administrative	Appointed	Institutional (College of Arms or similar body)
Quaestor	Belgian	Executive	Elected or Appointed	Institutional (student society)
Rabbi	Hebrew	Ceremonial	Identified	Institutional (synagogue)
Raja or Rani	Sanskrit	Executive	Hereditary	National/ tribal
Rajmata	Sanskrit	Ceremonial	Appointed	National/ regional
Reader	British	Administrative	Appointed	Institutional (university)
Recipient from the Inner Chamber	Tang dynasty	Ceremonial	Appointed	Courtly
Recipient of Edicts	Tang dynasty	Ceremonial	Appointed	Courtly
Rector	Latin	Administrative	Elected	Institutional (university)
Reverend	Christian	Ceremonial	Identified	Personal
Roju	Japanese	Administrative	Appointed	National
Sacristan	Christian	Administrative	Appointed/ elected	Institutional (local church)
Saint	Latin	Ceremonial	Appointed/ identified	Institutional/ personal/ supernatural
Sakellarios	Greek	Administrative	Appointed	Supranational
Sahib or Sahibah	Arabic	Ceremonial/ executive	Hereditary/ identified	National/ personal
Satrap	Persian	Executive	Appointed	Provincial
Savakabuddha	Pali	Ceremonial	Identified	Personal
Sebastokrator	Greek	Ceremonial	Appointed	Courtly
Sebastos or Sebaste	Greek	Ceremonial	Appointed	Courtly
Secretary of State	European	Administrative	Appointed	Diplomatic/ national
Seghatoleslam	Persian	Judicial	Appointed (based on studies at a hawza)	Personal
Selected Lady	Tang dynasty	Ceremonial	Appointed	Courtly
Senior Aircraftman or Senior Aircraftwoman	British	Administrative	Appointed	Divisional (non-supervisory)
Senior Lecturer	British	Administrative	Appointed	Institutional (university)
Sergeant	Latin	Executive	Appointed	Divisional (squad of 8 to 14 soldiers)
Servant in the Place of Truth	Egyptian	Ceremonial	Appointed?	Institutional (Theban Necropolis)
Service Provider	Tang dynasty	Ceremonial	Appointed	Courtly
Shah	Persian	Executive	Hereditary	National
Shaman	Global	Ceremonial	Identified	Tribal
Sheikh	Arabic	Institutional	Appointed	Anointed
Shifu (Protector Teacher)	Chinese	Ceremonial	Identified	Personal
Shigong (Teacher of my Teacher)	Chinese	Ceremonial	Identified	Personal
Shimu (Woman of my Teacher)	Chinese	Ceremonial	Identified	Personal
Shofet	Hebrew	Executive/ judicial	Elected	National/ tribal
Shōgun	Japanese	Executive	Hereditary	National
Sibyl	Greek	Ceremonial	Identified	Institutional (holy site)
Sister	Catholic, Latter Day Saint movement	Administrative/ Ceremonial	Appointed/ Identified	Personal/ Institutional
Somatophylax	Greek	Executive	Appointed	Courtly
Soter	Greek	Ceremonial	Identified	Supernatural
Spahbod	Persian	Executive	Appointed	Divisional (army corps of about 60,000 soldiers)
Sparapet	Armenian	Executive	Hereditary	Divisional (supreme military commander)
Sri or Sushri	Devanagari	Ceremonial	Identified	Personal
Starosta	Cyrillic	Executive	Appointed/ elected	Local/ national
Strategos	Greek	Executive	Appointed	Divisional (highest army rank)
Subedar	British/Indian	Executive	Appointed	Divisional (highest native rank in British India)
Sultan	Arabic	Executive	Hereditary	National
Sunim	Korean	Ceremonial	Identified	Institutional (temple)
Swami	Sanskrit	Ceremonial	Identified	Personal
Syntagmatarchis	Greek	Executive	Appointed	Divisional (regiment of 300 to 5,000 soldiers)
Tagmatarchis	Greek	Executive	Appointed	Divisional (tagma of 500 to 1500 soldiers)
Taitai (married Madam)	Chinese	Ceremonial	Identified	Personal
Talented	Tang dynasty	Ceremonial	Appointed	Courtly
Tanuter	Armenian	Executive	Hereditary	Local
Taoiseach	Irish	Executive	Appointed	National
Taxiarch	Greek	Executive	Appointed	Divisional (brigade of 4,000 to 5,000 soldiers)
Temple boy	Thai	Administrative	Appointed	Personal
Tenzo	Buddhist	Administrative	Appointed?	Institutional (monastery)
Tetrarch	Greek	Executive	Appointed	Supranational
Thakore or Thakurani	Indian	Executive	Hereditary	Provincial
Theorodokoi	Greek	Administrative	Appointed	Diplomatic
Theoroi	Greek	Administrative	Appointed?	Diplomatic
The Most Honourable	British	Executive/ legislative	Hereditary	Provincial
The Right Honourable	English	Administrative/ ceremonial/ legislative	Appointed/ hereditary	Local/ national
Tirbodh	Persian	Executive	Appointed	Divisional (archers)
Tóngzhi (Comrade)	Chinese	Ceremonial	Identified	Personal
Toqui	Mapudungun	Executive	Elected	Tribal
Towel Attendant	Tang dynasty	Ceremonial	Appointed	Courtly
Tribune	Latin	Legislative	Elected	National
Trierarch	Greek	Executive	Purchased	Divisional (trireme ship)
Tsar or Tsaritsa	Bulgarian	Executive	Hereditary	National/ supranational
Unsui	Japanese	Ceremonial	Identified	Personal
Upasaka	Sanskrit	Ceremonial	Appointed	Personal
Upajjhaya	Sanskrit	Ceremonial	Appointed?	Personal
Vajracharya	Nepalese	Ceremonial	Hereditary/ identified	Institutional (monastery)
Varma	Indian	Executive	Appointed/ hereditary	Courtly/ regional
Venerable	Buddhist/ Christian	Ceremonial	Appointed	Institutional/ supernatural
Vicar general	Christian	Administrative	Appointed	Provincial (diocesan)
Vice-Praeses	Belgian	Executive	Elected or Appointed	Institutional (student society)
Viceroy or Vicereine	European	Executive	Appointed	National/ regional
Voivode	Bulgarian	Executive	Appointed/ hereditary	Divisional/ provincial
Weiyuán (Delegate)	Chinese	Legislative	Appointed?	National
Xiaojie (Little Woman)	Chinese	Ceremonial	Identified	Personal
Xiansheng (Firstborn)	Chinese	Ceremonial	Identified	Personal
Xiaozhang (Senior)	Chinese	Executive	Appointed	Institutional (school)
Xry Hbt	Egyptian	Ceremonial	Appointed?	Institutional (ritual center)
Yisheng (Medical Scholar)	Chinese	Administrative	Appointed/ identified	Institutional (Traditional Chinese medicine)/ personal
Yishi (Medical Master)	Chinese	Administrative	Identified	Institutional (Traditional Chinese medicine)
Yuvraj or Yuvrani	Indian	Ceremonial	Hereditary	Courtly
Zamindar	Devanagari	Executive/ judicial	Appointed/ hereditary	Local/ provincial
Zongshi (Ancestral Teacher)	Chinese	Ceremonial	Identified	Personal
Zhuxi (Chairperson)	Chinese	Executive	Elected	National
Lands' Advocate	Dutch	Executive	Appointed	National
Stadtholder (Steward)	Dutch	Executive	Appointed	National
Grand Pensionary or councillor pensionary	Dutch	Executive	Appointed	National
Phra Bat Somdet Phra Chao Yu Hua or Somdet Phra Chao Yu Hua	Thai	Executive	Hereditary	National
Somdet Phra Akkhara Mahesi	Thai	Ceremonial	Appointed	Courtly
Phra Mahesi	Thai	Ceremonial	Appointed	Courtly
Phra Sanom	Thai	Ceremonial	Appointed	Courtly
Somdet Chao Fa	Thai	Ceremonial	Hereditary	Courtly
Phra Ong Chao	Thai	Ceremonial	Hereditary	Courtly
Mom Chao	Thai	Ceremonial	Hereditary	Courtly
Chao Fa	Thai	Ceremonial	Hereditary	Courtly
Mom Rachawong	Thai	Ceremonial	Hereditary	Courtly
Mom Luang	Thai	Ceremonial	Hereditary	Courtly
Mom	Thai	Ceremonial	Hereditary	Courtly
Somdet Krom Phraya or Somdet Phra	Thai	Ceremonial	Appointed	Courtly
Krom Phra	Thai	Ceremonial	Appointed	Courtly
Kromma Luang	Thai	Ceremonial	Appointed	Courtly
Kromma Khun	Thai	Ceremonial	Appointed	Courtly
Kromma Muen	Thai	Ceremonial	Appointed	Courtly
Chao Phraya	Thai	Executive	Appointed	Provincial
Phraya	Thai	Executive	Appointed	Provincial
Phra	Thai	Executive	Appointed	Local
Luang	Thai	Executive	Appointed	Local
Khun	Thai	Executive	Appointed	Local
Meun	Thai	Executive	Appointed	Local
Phan	Thai	Executive	Appointed	Local
Nai	Thai	Executive	Appointed	Local
Chao	Thai	Executive	Appointed	Tribal
Nayok Ratthamontri	Thai	Executive	Elected / Appointed	National
Phu Wa	Thai	Executive	Elected / Appointed	Provincial
Nayok	Thai	Executive	Elected / Appointed	Local
Ratthamontri	Thai	Executive	Elected / Appointed	Institutional

== See also ==
- Imperial, royal and noble ranks
- List of comparative military ranks
- List of academic ranks
