= Examples of feudalism =

Societies practising feudalism

Feudalism was practiced in many different ways, depending on location and period, thus a high-level encompassing conceptual definition does not always provide a reader with the intimate understanding that detailed historical examples provide.

== Western European feudalism ==
=== England ===
Feudalism in the 12th century Norman England was among the better structured and established in Europe at the time. However, it could be structurally complex, which is illustrated by the example of the feudal barony of Stafford as described in a survey of knight's fees made in 1166 and recorded in The Black Book of the Exchequer. This was a roll of parchment or several such, recording the quantity and tenant of each knight's fee held in capital. It was a record commissioned by the Treasury as the knight's fee was the primary basis for assessing certain types of taxation, for example, feudalism is the exchange of land for military service, thus everything was based on what was called the knight's fee, which is a fiefdom or estate of land. A feudal barony contained several knight's fees, for example, the baron Robert de Stafford held a barony containing 60 knight's fees. Often lords were not so much lords presiding over great estates, but managers of a network of tenants and sub-leases.

Stafford tenants were themselves lords of the manors they held from him, which is altogether different from their being barons. Henry D'Oilly, who held 3 fees from Robert de Stafford, also held, as a tenant-in-chief, over 30 fees elsewhere that had been granted to him directly by the king. Thus while Henry was the vassal of his overlord Robert, Henry was himself a lord of his manors held in capital and sub-enfeoffed many of his manors which he did not keep in demesne, that is to say under his management using simple employees. These complex relationships invariably create loyalty problems through conflicts of interest. To resolve this the concept of a liege lord existed, which meant that the vassal was loyal to his liege lord above all others, except the king himself, no matter what.

Magna Carta was used in 1215 by the barons to force King John to respect feudal rights, limiting the power of the King by defying his rights under feudal law.

=== France ===
From the 11th century, among the complexities of feudal arrangements, there existed no guarantee that contracts between lord and vassal would be honored, and feudal contracts saw little enforcement from those with greater authority. This often resulted in the wealthier and more powerful party taking advantage of the weaker.

Such was (allegedly) the case of Hugh de Lusignan and his relations with his lord William V of Aquitaine. Between 1020 and 1025 Hugh wrote or possibly dictated a complaint against William and his vassals describing the unjust treatment he had received at the hands of both. Hugh describes a convoluted intermingling of loyalties that was characteristic of the period and instrumental in developing strain between nobles that resulted in competition for each other's land. According to Hugh's account, William wronged him on numerous occasions, often to the benefit of William's vassals. Many of his properties suffered similar fates: seized by opponents and divided between them and William. William neglected to send military aid to Hugh when necessary and dealt most unfairly in the exchange of hostages. Each time Hugh reclaimed one of his properties, William ordered him to return it to whoever had recently taken it from him. William broke multiple oaths in succession yet Hugh continued to put faith in his lord's word, to his ruin. In his last contract with William, over possession of his uncle's castle at Chiza, Hugh dealt in no uncertain terms and with frank language:

Hugh: You are my lord, I will not accept a pledge from you, but I will simply rely on the mercy of God and yourself.

William: Give up all those claims over which you have quarreled with me in the past and swear fidelity to me and my son and I will give you your uncle's honor [Chizes] or something else of equal value in exchange for it.
Hugh: My lord, I beg you through God and this blessed crucifix which is made in the figure of Christ that you do not make me do this if you and your son were intending to threaten me with trickery.
William: On my honor and my son I will do this without trickery.
Hugh: And when I shall have sworn fidelity to you, you will demand Chizes castle of me, and if I should not turn it over to you, you will say that it is not right that I deny you the castle which I hold from you, and if I should turn it over to you, you and your son will seize it because you have given nothing in pledge except the mercy of God and yourself.

William: We will not do that, but if we should demand it of you, don't turn it over to us.

While perhaps an embellishment of the truth for the sake of Hugh's cause, and not necessarily a microcosm of the feudal system everywhere, the Agreement Between Lord and Vassal is evidence at least of corruption in feudal rule.

The feudal system was almost completely wiped out in France by the revolution in 1789 by eliminating the rights of the seigneur.

=== Normandy ===
When Rollo took Normandy from the French king Charles the Simple in 911, the ownership of Normandy was given quasi fundum et allodium — in absolute ownership, allowing the duke Rollo, as seigneur, to give everyday use of portions of land to his followers, in exchange for recognition of the lords' rights and agreeing to foi et homage - providing services and paying homage. This continued until 1204, when Normandy once again became part of France, except for the Channel Islands, where fiefs would in future be held for the English Crown in right of the ducal title.

=== North American colonies ===
Semi-feudal systems accompanied colonialism in some European settlements in North America:

- Patroon system in New Netherland, which lasted until the Anti-Rent War and the New York Constitution of 1846;
- Seigneurial system of New France (now Canada), which was abolished in 1854 under British rule, though transitional rent payments persisted until 1970.

=== Portugal ===
Portugal, originally a part of the Kingdom of León, was an example of a feudal society, according to Marc Bloch.

Portugal has its roots in a feudal state in northern Iberia, the County of Portugal, established in 868 within the Kingdom of Asturias. The Vímara Peres, the local counts' dynasty, was suppressed in 1071, but twenty-two years later, in 1093, King Alphonse VI of Léon and Castille gave the county as a fiefdom to Henry of Burgundy (a younger Capet who was participating in the reconquista), when he married Theresa, the king's natural daughter.

Despite their vassal link, Henry had remarkable autonomy, especially after his father-in-law died in 1109. The establishment of the monarchy in Portugal was obtained by his son, Afonso I of Portugal when, after defeating the Muslims at the Battle of Ourique, proclaimed himself King of Portugal in 1139, cutting definitively all feudal bonds with the Kingdom of León. Upon seeing the weakness of feudal society due to the Muslim invasion, Portugal became independent from the Kingdom of León as Castile had done a century earlier.

== "Semi-feudal" (non-Western European) feudalism ==
Outside of a medieval European historical context, the concept of feudalism is generally used by analogy (called semi-feudal), most often in discussions of Japan under the shōguns, Thai sakdina and, sometimes, nineteenth-century Ethiopia. However, some have taken the feudalism analogy further, seeing it in places as diverse as Ancient Egypt, the Parthian Empire, India, and the American South of the nineteenth century.

=== Byzantine Empire ===
Pronoia, the 11th-century system of land grants in the Byzantine Empire, makes a useful contrast to feudal tenure in the European West. Another distinction between the European West can be made in that paroiki (people who lived and farmed on the land of the Pronoiars) owed no debt or loyalty to the pronoiars (the recipients of the Pronoia). This system was adopted by Serbia and then the Ottoman Empire after the fall of the Byzantine Empire at their hands, which called their land grants timar and the recipients of the land grants "timariots".

=== Russia ===
In contrast to Western Europe where feudalism created a strong central power, it took a strong central power to develop feudalism in Russia. A lack of true central power weakened the Russian principalities. In addition, there were few landlords and a lack of political or judicial institutions that could bind peasants to the land. The Russians developed its system of land/lord/worker, loosely called feudalism, after it had created a strong central power in the 15th century. Lacking a feudal system of vassal loyalty made it impossible for any prince, early on, to gain enough influence and power to project a strong force against any invaders.

In contrast to other European forms of serfdom and feudalism there was a lack of vassalage and loyalty to the lord whose land the serfs worked. It took a much longer period for feudalism to develop but when it did it took on a much harsher form than elsewhere in Europe. Serfs had no rights whatsoever; they could be traded like livestock by their lords. They had no ownership of anything, including their own families, all of which belonged to their lord.

Another major difference was the lack of independent principalities; this was due to the lack of vassalage. Separate lords did not command their troops to protect their lands.

=== Armenia ===
The Nakharar system used by the Armenian nobility throughout Medieval Armenia has often been described as feudal, with hereditary houses of nobles owning large estates, each headed by its own tanuter, and with the estates themselves divided amongst the family. For Armenia as a whole, a Sparapet (supreme commander), King, and chief Aspet were each taken from individual noble houses. However, Armenian feudalism differs from the feudalism of most of Europe as the estates were owned by families, not lords, and could not be split or given without the family's permission. Also, if a tanuter died heirless, he was succeeded by a different branch of the family, rather than by a noble who was sworn to him. Cilician Armenia, through contact with crusader states, had a system even closer to Western feudalism. The economic and political systems of medieval Europe in which people exchanged loyalty and labor for a lord's protection.

=== Pakistan, India and Bangladesh ===
The Taluqdari, Jotedari or Zamindari system is often referred to as a feudal or feudal-like system. Originally the system was introduced in the pre-colonial period to collect taxes from peasants, and it continued during colonial British rule. After independence Zamindari was abolished in India and East Pakistan (present day Bangladesh), but it is still present today in Pakistan. In modern times historians have become very reluctant to classify other societies into European models and today it is rare for Zamindari to be described as feudal by academics; it is still done in popular usage, however, but only for pejorative reasons to express disfavor, typically by critics of the system.

=== China ===
Feudalism is the model that modern Chinese Marxists and Tokyo school historians use to identify China's recent past, neologized from the Chinese concept of fengjian (which means to allocate a region or piece of land to an individual, establishing him as the ruler of that region), a term used to designate the multi-state system which existed in China under the Zhou dynasty, eradicated following Qin's wars of unification in favour of the commandery–county system.

During the Zhou dynasty, each lord was given land, and his power was legitimized by nominal allegiance to the central Zhou king; politics thus revolved around these noble households. Each local state was governed independently with taxes, currency, and laws set by the aristocratic clan chief in charge of the territory, but the nobles were required to pay regular homage to the Zhou kings as an act of fealty and acknowledgement of the king's ritual authority. In times of war, the nobles were required to provide armed service to the king.

Broadly, while fengjian shared several similarities with later Western feudalism, the local chiefs were afforded greater autonomy in their own territories, but the king owed them no mutual defense. The matter was further complicated by a bifurcation in territorial administration, where the western heartland of the Zhou royals was more directly governed, but certain lineages enjoyed greater independence from the royal house, which was junior to their own lineages within the Ji ancestral temple community.

Early Chinese titles were a mixture of political and kinship terms, and did not attain systematization until the late Spring and Autumn period. As the Zhou dynasty's control weakened, the regional magnates caused further title inflation by referring to themselves as Kings; the inflation was such that under the Han dynasty, many local lords were established with the title of "king"; in imperial China, the character is thus more normally rendered as "prince". The notion of "prime minister" 太宰 in early China came from the aristocratic meaning of "chief housekeeper" or "butler" of a noble household, in a similar way to the development of such European titles as "constable".

At the transition from the Western Zhou to the Eastern Zhou, the political power of the Zhou royal house fell sharply. The collapse of central authority led to a geopolitical situation marked by considerable infighting by the landed aristocracy and their successors, often ministerial lineages.

After the last King of Qin, known to posterity as the First Emperor of Qin, defeated his rival states, founding the first empire, he formally abolished the largely defunct fengjian system, replacing it with a bureaucratized system of literate civil servants. Despite the rapid collapse of the Qin and an abortive attempt at reinstitution of fengjian by Xiang Yu, the following Han dynasty maintained the vast majority of Qin's bureaucratic reforms, establishing them as the new standard of government for the next two thousand years of imperial Chinese history. Han dynasty scholarship would decry the First Emperor as a tyrant whose crimes included deconstructing the fengjian system, which was misunderstood in anachronistic overly systematized form as an integral component of the idealized society of the Western Zhou. While most Chinese dynasties began with imperial relatives being granted control of some local territories, and there were many instances of aristocratic clans surpassing the power of the imperial house, officially devolved power for a military elite present in the fengjian system would not again be implemented in China.

=== Tibet ===
Whether Tibet constituted a feudal social system or if peasants could be considered serfs is still debated. Studied districts of Tibet between the 17th and 20th-century show evidence of a striated society with land ownership laws and tax responsibility that resemble European feudal systems. However, scholars have pointed out key differences that make the comparison contested and only limited evidence from that period is available for study. Scholar Geoff Samuel further argued that Tibet even in the early 20th century did not constitute a single state but rather a collection of districts and a legal system of Lhasa with particular land and tax laws did not extend over the entire country.

However, according to Melvyn Goldstein, for the 20th century, the Tibetan political system can not be categorized as feudal since Tibet possessed a centralized state.

=== Japan ===
The Tokugawa shogunate was a feudal military dictatorship of Japan established in the 17th century lasting until 1868. It marks a period often referred to loosely as 'feudal Japan', otherwise known as the Edo period. While modern historians have become very reluctant to classify other societies into European models, in Japan, the system of land tenure and a vassal receiving tenure in exchange for an oath of fealty is very close to what happened in parts of medieval Europe, and thus the term is sometimes used in connection with Japan. Karl Friday notes that in the 21st century, historians of Japan rarely invoke feudalism; instead of looking at similarities, specialists attempting comparative analysis concentrate on fundamental differences.

== Modern traces ==
=== Scotland ===
For full discussion, see Scots feudal law

Scots law is quite different from English law. One scholar explained it in 1924 as follows:

It is a law of Roman and feudal origin which has been adapted in eight centuries by legislation and by judicial decisions to the needs of the Scottish people, and during the last century has, little by little, been combined with the English law by a slow operation of fusion.

The system of land tenure in Scotland was until recently feudal. In theory, this meant that the land was held under The Crown as the ultimate feudal superior. Historically, The Crown would make a grant of land in return for military or other services and the grantees would in turn make sub-grants for other services and so on. Those making grants – the "superiors" – retained a legal interest in the land ("dominium directum"), and so a hierarchical structure was created with each property having several owners, co-existing simultaneously. Only one of these, the vassal, has what in normal language would be regarded as ownership of the property ("dominium utile").

The Abolition of Feudal Tenure etc. (Scotland) Act 2000 abolished the feudal system of land tenure in Scotland and replaced it with a system of outright ownership of land. Since the Act became fully effective on 28 November 2004, the vassal owns the land outright, and superiority interests disappeared. The right of feudal superiors to enforce conditions was ended, subject to certain saving provisions of a restricted nature. Feu duty was abolished although compensation may be payable. The delay between royal assent and coming into force was caused by the great number of transitional arrangements needed to be put into place before final abolition and because of the close relation that the 2000 Act has to the Title Conditions Act 2003.

=== England ===
Unique in England, the village of Laxton in Nottinghamshire continues to retain some vestiges of the feudal system in which the land is still farmed using the open field system. The feudal court now meets only annually, with its authority now restricted to the management of the farmland.

In the New Forest Common Rights created 900 years ago still exist for around 500 commoners who exercise their rights to graze certain animals and collect wood for fuel. Managed by Verderers, who uphold the law in the Court of Verderers.

=== Sark ===
The tiny island of Sark, in the Channel Islands, was arguably the last feudal state in Europe which ended after 450 years on 9 April 2008. The island was a fiefdom of the larger nearby island of Guernsey and administered independently by a Seigneur, who was a vassal to the land's owner, the Queen of the United Kingdom. Sark's ruling body voted on 4 October 2006 to replace the remaining tenement seats in Chief Pleas with a fully-elected democratic government, which was implemented on April 9, 2008.

=== North Korea ===
North Korea has been described as a feudal state because of its caste system, Songbun. Regular citizens can be seen as peasants, soldiers as knights, higher members at the Workers' Party of Korea as nobles and the Kim dynasty as monarchs.

== See also ==
- Russian serfdom
- Irish Land League
- Neo-feudalism
- Refeudalization
