= Chakaran =

Chakaran Chākarān
- Location in Afghanistan
- Coordinates: 36°54′59″N 71°4′6″E
- Country: Afghanistan
- Province: Badakhshan Province
- District: Wurduj
- Time zone: + 4.30

Chakaran is a village in Badakhshan Province in north-eastern Afghanistan, on the right bank of the Warduj River, about 18 miles southeast of Khairabad. It had previously been the main village of the Warduj area, and where the arbab and aksakal resided. A stream runs from a large ravine, past this village, and into the Warduj River. Around 1900, the village had been a large one, with roughly 80 houses, which cultivated a variety of fruit trees, as well as melons and watermelons.
