= Aspet (disambiguation) =

Aspet can refer to:

- Aspet, a medieval Armenian title, equivalent to knight.

It may also refer to:

- the Ainu name of Ashibetsu, a city located in Sorachi, Hokkaidō, Japan
- Aspet, Haute-Garonne, a commune in the Haute-Garonne département, in France
- American Society for Pharmacology and Experimental Therapeutics (ASPET)
