= Aspbed =

Title used in Parthian and Sassanian empires

Aspbed (also spelled Aspbad and asppat; literally “commander of the cavalry”, from Old Iranian *aspa-pati-), was a title of Iranian origin used by the Parthian and Sasanian empires.

== History ==
The word is first attested in an ostracon from the ancient Parthian city Nisa, where it says; “Tirdat, great aspbed, chief commander of the cavalry”. This office was most likely one of the highest ones in the Parthian army, which had its main strength from the cavalry. The Armenian office of aspet, is derived from the aspbed office. The powerful House of Suren, which had its allowance of crowning the Parthian kings, also had many members which held the title of aspbed.

The title was also used by the successors of the Parthians, the Sasanians, which is written down in one of the inscriptions of king Shapur I (r. 240–270), which mentions a certain Peroz holding the title. However, the title was not as important as it was in the Parthian period, and it was probably later held by the asvaran salar (“chief of the cavalry”). It is recorded (in Middle Persian: 𐭠𐭮𐭯𐭯𐭲𐭩 ʾsppty) in a seal belonging to a certain Weh-Shapur, a spahbed of Khosrow I.

== See also ==
- Spahbed

== Sources ==
- Chaumont, M. L. (1987). "Aspbed". Encyclopaedia Iranica, Vol. II, Fasc. 8. pp. 791–792.
