= Chinese titles =

In Chinese-speaking societies around the world, an honorific title is attached after the family name of an individual when addressing that person. Aside from addressing colleagues or family of equal or lesser rank, it is considered impolite to refer to others by their name only.

== Honorific titles ==
The most common honorific titles are similar to the English Mr, Sir, Mrs, Ms, Miss, Madam, etc. The Chinese titles, unlike in English, always follow the name of the person and can stand alone.

=== Men ===
- Xiānshēng 先生 (born first, Mr., Sir.): This is a term commonly used as a respectful form of address for male law enforcement officials and other men. Originally it was reserved for teachers and other professionals such as doctors and lawyers, but its use widened during the Republic of China era to include all male members of society. It can either follow the surname or the given names (or courtesy name). In common speech, the former is more common (e.g. Mister Jiang is 蔣先生, Jiǎng xiānshēng), but in formal contexts, the given names are often used as if they were the two character courtesy name (e.g. Chiang Ching-kuo is Mister Ching-kuo: 經國先生, Jīngguó xiānshēng). This can be combined with formal titles to indicate even more respect (e.g. Chiang Ching-kuo can also be referred to as President Chiang, Mister Ching-kuo 蔣總統經國先生, Jiǎng zǒngtǒng, Jīngguó xiānshēng). It is the same as sensei in Japanese, though its use is much less restrictive, more like how san would be used in Japanese. It is also used as a title for a man of respected stature.
- Gōng 公 (lord, literally duke): Today, this respectful honorific is mainly applied to deceased male relatives. In imperial times, it was a title of nobility equivalent to duke (e.g. the head descendant of Confucius was normally appointed the Duke Kung 孔公, Kǒng gōng). Whenever it is used, it always follows the surname of the person being referred to (e.g. Chiang Kai-shek is posthumously known in Taiwan as the Lord Chiang 蔣公, Jiǎng gōng).
- Zǐ 子 (Great Master), the highest title for an intellectual especially philosopher in ancient China, such as Lǎo Zǐ (老子 Laozi), Kǒng Zǐ (孔子 Confucius), Mèng Zǐ (孟子 Mencius), Mò Zǐ 墨子(Mozi) and Sūn Zǐ (孫子 Sun Tzu).

=== Women ===
- Xiǎojiě 小姐 (young woman), Miss: This honorific was originally used to refer to a young and unmarried woman. It follows the surname of the woman or can be used alone as a title of address. Today, however, it could in the northern regions of the People's Republic of China be associated as a slang term for "prostitute" or in restaurants addressing waitresses, by means of verbal inflections of tone or other indications.
- Tàitai 太太 (Madam): This honorific is used to refer to a married woman. It is added after the surname of the husband or can be used alone as a title of address. It is used in familial and personal relations, but completely absent in formal business contexts since it emphasizes age and marital bond.
- Nǚshì 女士 (Ms., Mrs.): In proper usage, this title follows a married woman's maiden name only. (For example, Hillary Rodham 女士, not Hillary Clinton 女士.) However, it is loosely used by those looking for a Chinese equivalent of "Ms." An older single woman is often addressed as 女士, but this term presumes the woman is married.
- Fūrén 夫人 (Madame; Mrs.): Traditionally used to refer to a lady of high rank, the term has fallen into disuse since the late 20th century except in formal contexts: President Hu Jintao and Mrs. Hu are 胡锦涛主席和夫人, Hú Jǐntāo zhǔxí hé fūrén (but contemporary custom dictates that Mrs. Hu is never Madame Hu Jintao 胡锦涛夫人 Hú Jǐntāo fūrén), or to translate a woman's name that is derived from the surname of their husbands: Mrs. Thatcher is 撒切爾夫人, sǎqiē'ěr fūrén). It is used following the husband's full name or surname, or can be used as title on its own (e.g. Madame Chiang is 蔣夫人, Jiǎng fūrén). It can also be used to address female law enforcement officials.

== Occupational titles ==
Chinese people often address professionals in formal situations by their occupational titles. These titles can either follow the surname (or full name) of the person in reference, or it can stand alone either as a form of address or if the person being referred to is unambiguous without the added surname.

=== Academia ===
- Lǎoshī 老師 (old master), when addressing a teacher.
- Xiàozhǎng 校長 (school senior), when addressing the school headmaster or principal. Chinese does not have specific titles for heads of universities (e.g. Chancellor, Rector, or President), so this term is applied in higher education as well. Generally, the word zhǎng (長) is added to an institutional name to refer to the leader of that institution.
- Jiàoshòu 教授 (instruct confer; confer instruction), when addressing a professor.
- Xiānshēng 先生 (born before), when addressing a teacher, currently less used but still remains legitimate

The use of the term equivalent of "Doctorate / doctor" (博士, bóshì) is less common in Chinese as it is in English. The term boshi is used both as an honorific title and a name for the degree. Like in English, holders of a doctorate can have the title added to their names (but at the end instead of before), but use of the undistinguishing xiānshēng or nǚshì (or professional titles such as jiàoshòu) is much more prevalent.

=== Government and politics ===
- Shūjì 书记 (secretary): Leaders and representatives of the communist committees or organizations. Currently, the Head of the Chinese Communist Party is called General Secretary (Zǒngshūjì, 总书记).
- Zhǔxí 主席 (chairman): Leaders of certain organizations such as political parties use this title. Notably, it applied to Chairman Mao Zedong who was referred to as Máo Zhǔxí (毛主席) as the Chairman of the Chinese Communist Party.
- Wěiyuán 委员 (delegate): This term can be used to refer to any member of a committee or council. This was especially prevalent in the system of party and state committees the Kuomintang used to govern China in the 1930s and 1940s. The Chinese Communist Party also operates under a system of parallel committees, but prefer the more proletarian term tóngzhì (e.g. members of the Legislative Yuan are all addressed as lifa weiyuan, legislative delegates, and individually as surname+weiyuan or more formally surname+wěiyuán+given name+nushi/xiansheng).
- Tóngzhì 同志 (comrade): This term is commonly used by political party members to address each other. Its use expanded to all segments of society during the rule of Mao Zedong. It is still used by leaders of the Chinese Communist Party on formal occasions, and to a much lesser degree, leaders of the Kuomintang.

=== Medicine ===
- Yīshēng (i-seng) 醫生 (medical scholar), most commonly used when addressing a doctor; used for practitioners of both Western and traditional Chinese medicine.
- Yīshī 醫師 (medical master), is a more formal title when addressing a practitioner of traditional Chinese medicine, but is also used for doctors and for practitioners of both Western and traditional Chinese medicine in Taiwan.
- Láukun 老君 (old lord), is a common Hokkien term for Doctor influenced by Taoism and is mainly used in Southeast Asia but can also mean wise man.
- Dàifu 大夫 (great man), an older title used to address high officials in ancient times, now used colloquially when addressing a doctor.
- Xiānshēng 先生 (born before) historical, no longer used.

=== Martial arts ===
A list of titles when addressing a martial arts master. The titles below are listed by the Mandarin pronunciation which is the national language in China. In the West, the titles are more commonly known by their Cantonese pronunciation which are given in brackets.

- Shīfu (Sifu) 師父 (teacher father), used when addressing one's own martial arts instructor. But can also be used for teacher/instructors of other kind.
- Shīgōng (Sigung) 師公 (teacher grandfather), used when addressing the teacher of one's Shifu.
- Shīmǔ (Simo) 師母 (teacher mother), used when addressing the wife of Shifu.
- Zōngshī 宗師 (ancestral teacher), technically the founder of a discipline or branch (宗派), used when addressing a great master.

== See also ==
- Chinese nobility
- Chinese pronouns
- Japanese honorifics
- Surnames by country § East Asia
- Chinese name
