= Karl Friday =

American historian

Karl F. Friday (born 1957) is an American Japanologist.

Friday earned a bachelor's degree in Japanese at the University of Kansas in 1979, followed by a master's degree in East Asian languages and culture from the same institution in 1983. He then attended Stanford University to pursue graduate study in history, earning a Master of Arts degree in 1986, followed by a doctorate in 1989. Friday began his teaching career as an assistant professor at the University of San Diego. In 1990, he joined the faculty of the University of Georgia, where he was successively promoted to associate professor in 1993, and full professor in 1999. Upon retiring in 2012, Friday was granted emeritus status. He later served as Director of the IES Abroad Tokyo Center, and as professor, and currently professor emeritus, at Saitama University, in Japan. Friday specialized in the study of samurai history and culture, including Japanese martial arts. Friday also holds menkyo kaiden license in Kashima Shinryū.

== Selected publications ==
- The Routledge Handbook of Premodern Japanese History. Routledge, 2017.
- Japan Emerging: Premodern History to 1850. Routledge, 2012.
- Friday, Karl (2007). The First Samurai: The Life and Legend of the Warrior Rebel, Taira Masakado. Wiley. ISBN 9780471760825.
- Friday, Karl (2003). Samurai, Warfare and the State in Early Medieval Japan. Routledge. ISBN 9780415329620.
- Friday, Karl; Seki, Humitake (1997). Legacies of the Sword: The Kashima-Shinryu and Samurai Martial Culture. University of Hawaii Press. ISBN 9780824818470.
- Friday, Karl (1992). Hired Swords: The Rise of Private Warrior Power in Early Japan. Stanford University Press. ISBN 9780804719780.
