= Apodektai =

The apodektai (Ancient Greek: ἀποδέκται, "receivers") were public officers at Athens, who were introduced by Cleisthenes in the place of the ancient kolakretai (κωλακρέται). They were ten in number, one for each Athenian tribe (phyle), and their duty was to receive all the ordinary taxes and distribute them to the separate branches of the administration, which were entitled to them. They accordingly kept lists of persons indebted to the state, made entries of all monies that were paid in, and erased the names of the debtors from the lists. They had the power to decide causes connected with the subjects under their management; though if the matters in dispute were of importance, they were obliged to bring them for decision into the ordinary courts.
