= Arbab =

Persian title and word for "boss" or "master"

Arbab (Persian: ارباب) is a Persian word that means "boss", "master" and "landlord" or "one endowed with a special quality". The term is equivalent to the Armenian title tanuter. It was a title used by tribal leaders in Middle East and South Asia.
