= Nakharar =

Hereditary title of the Armenian nobility

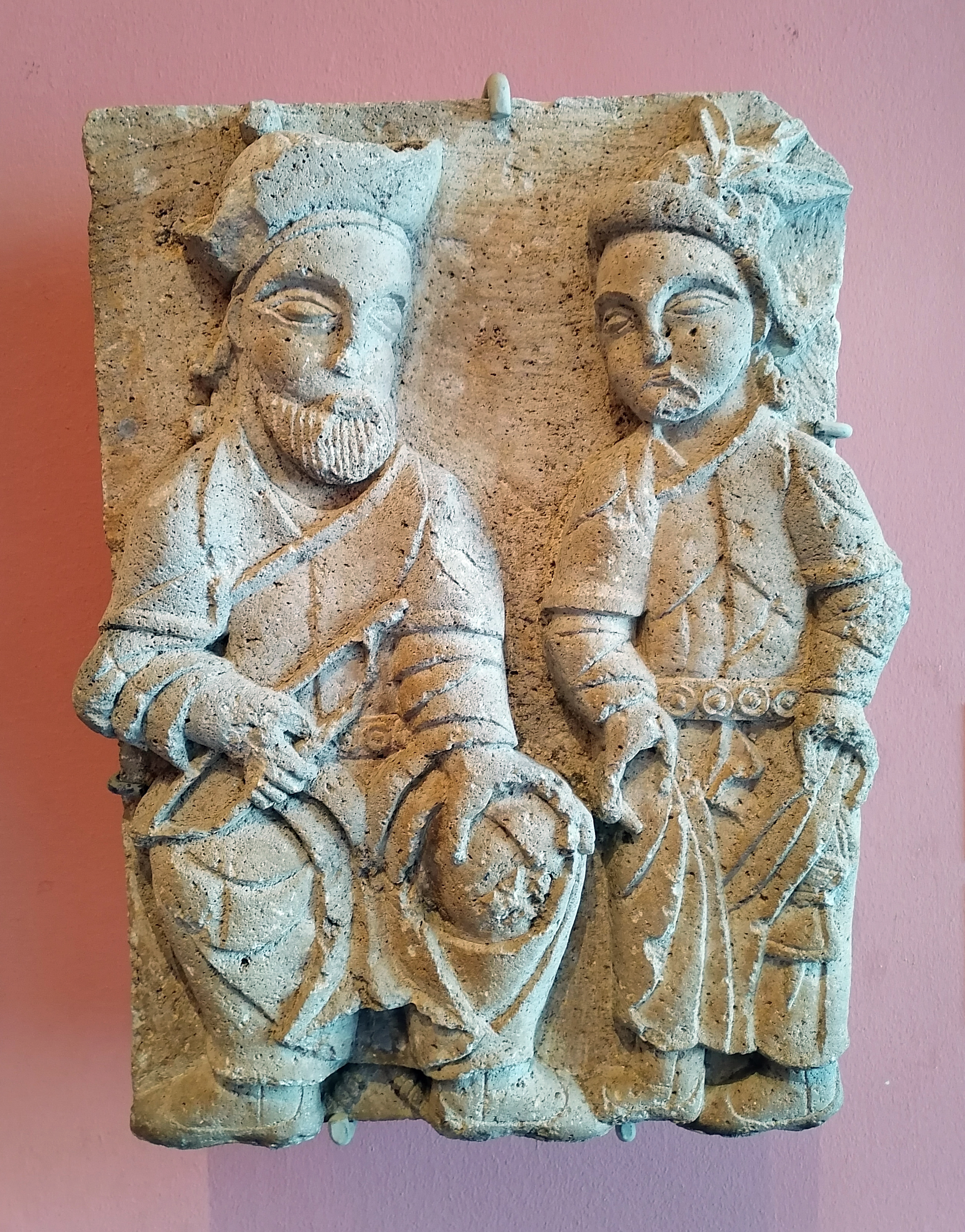
Relief depicting Eachi and Amir Hassan II of the Proshian dynasty, c. 1321. The Proshyans were Nakharars for the Zakarids in historical Armenia during the 13th-14th centuries.

Nakharar (Armenian: նախարար, also transliterated as naxarar) was the term used in ancient and medieval Armenia to refer to the members of the highest-ranking class of the nobility. The social order of ancient Armenia, which was based on the division of the country into large estates ruled by noble clans, is known in modern scholarship as the nakharar system.

== Primary sources ==
The main source for the study of the nakharar system is the late CE 5th-century Armenian history Buzandaran Patmutiwnk (Epic Histories, formerly attributed to an otherwise unattested Pawstos Buzand/Faustus of Byzantium), which reflects Armenian oral tradition more accurately than the works of other, more learned authors. The Gahnamak (Rank List) lists the Armenian noble families according to a hierarchy of precedence; although the Gahnamak is a late source of doubtful authenticity, such a hierarchy did exist, reflected in the cushion (bardz) or throne (gah) occupied by the nakharars at the royal court. This ranking was likely connected to the military strength of each clan, which the Zornamak, an even later and less reliable document, purports to record.

== Etymology and usage ==
Various etymologies have been proposed for the term nakharar, but the derivation that is now broadly accepted is from Parthian naxvadār, meaning "senior representative of the local nobility" and literally translating to "holder of the primacy".

The term nakharar was apparently used to refer to the highest-ranking class of the Armenian nobility, above the azat or lesser nobility. It included all the members of an Armenian noble clan, including the clan head (tanuter or nahapet) and the junior members (sepuh), although it was sometimes used as a synonym for nahapet. Other terms used to refer to the top layer of the Armenian nobility were metsametsk (from mets 'great', also metsamets nakharark, corresponding to Iranian wuzurgan), and gaheretsk (from gah 'throne' and erets 'senior'). Nakharar has been translated into English as satrap, and it was also the term used to translate Greek satrapes into Armenian, for example, in the Armenian Bible. Another English term used to refer to the nakharar class is magnates.

== System ==
Medieval Armenia was divided into large estates, which were the property of an enlarged noble family and were ruled by a member of it, to whom the title of nahapet, "chief of the family" or tanuter "master of the house", was given. Other members of a nakharar family in their turn ruled over smaller portions of the family estate. Nakharars with greater authority were recognized as ishkhans (princes).

This system has often been labelled as feudal for practical purposes; however, there are differences between this system and the feudal system later adopted in Western Europe. The estate as a whole was actually ruled by a single person, it was nonetheless considered the property of his whole enlarged family, so that, if the ruler died heirless, he was succeeded by a member of a different branch of the family. Furthermore, the ruler was allowed to alienate a part of the family estate only to another member of the family or by permission of the whole enlarged family. This may also explain why Armenian feudal families were normally endogamic, in order not to scatter parts of their property, as would have happened if they had to give a part of their property to another family as dowry. Endogamic marriages had a religious reason as well, particularly before Christianity, because Armenian paganism favoured marriages between relatives very highly.

Each nakharar had his own army, depending on his domain. The national force or "royal cavalry" was under the sparapet, a commander-in-chief who presided over the whole of the nation. After the country's Christianization, schools and courts were all run by the Armenian clergy.

In 4th-century Armenia, as in Parthia, large estates were hereditarily possessed by noble families and actually ruled by one of their members. The whole enlarged family was devoted to the worship of the same ancestors, lived in small fortified villages and spent most part of their time in hunting and in banqueting. Furthermore, each nakharar family had a particular social function: in Armenia a member of the Arshakuni family was chosen as king, who was consequently a sort of primus inter pares; the Mamikonians fielded the sparapet, one of the Bagratunis was the cavalry chief (aspet) and king crowner (tagadir), and so on.

== History ==
The nakharar system appears to have originated near or before the beginning of the Common Era, probably emerging under the Artaxiad dynasty and existing during the entire Arsacid period in Armenia and for centuries after its end. Pliny the Elder (1st century CE) reports that Armenia was divided into 120 "strategies" (strategoi), which according to Nina Garsoïan suggests that the system of "great autonomous families each controlling its own lands" was already developing in the Armenia of Tigranes the Great's (r. 95–55 BCE) time. Nicholas Adontz writes that the strategoi and nakharars evolved from the tribal system of the komarchoi mentioned by Xenophon, but this is rejected by Marie-Louise Chaumont, who states that the komarchoi were village headmen and low-ranking Achaemenid officials and are not comparable with the strategoi and nakharars of the periods.

The nakharars survived the fall of the Arshakuni dynasty and the subsequent placement of the Marzban Governor-Generals by Sassanid king, and allowed a great deal of autonomy for the vassal state, up until the attempted conversion of Armenia to Zoroastrianism by Yazdegerd II, in which Vartan Mamikonian led a rebellion, and through the Battle of Avarayr convinced the Persians that conversion would come at too high a price, eventually leading to the Nvarsak Treaty.

In western Armenia under Byzantine rule, Justinian's reforms removed the martial role of the nakharars, as well as attempting to annex estates from Armenian nobles. The nakharars, angered at their restriction in power, began a full-scale insurrection that had to be quelled through swift military intervention, eventually sparking war with the Sassanids.

Though weakened by numerous invasions and the legal reforms of Kings, the nakharar structure remained virtually unchanged for many centuries and was finally eliminated during the Mongol invasions in the 13th century. According to Nina Garsoïan, in 17th century Safavid Iran, traces of this institution were still respected when Tatev Monastery was transferred from uncle to nephew, since it was owned by their family. Certain aspects of the nakharar system remained intact in Armenia until the early 20th century, when the noble class was altogether abolished by the Bolsheviks.

== Bibliography ==
- Achaṛyan, H. (1977). "Nakharar" նախարար. Hayeren armatakan baṛaran Հայերեն արմատական բառարան. Vol. 3 (2nd ed.). Yerevan: Erevani hamalsarani Erewani hamalsarani hratarakchʻutʻyun. pp. 420–421.
- Adontz, Nicholas (1970). Armenia in the Period of Justinian: The Political Conditions Based on the Naxarar System. Translated by Nina G. Garsoïan. Lisbon: Calouste Gulbenkian Foundation.
- Chaumont, M. L. (1986). "Armenia and Iran ii. The pre-Islamic period". In Yarshater, Ehsan (ed.). Encyclopædia Iranica. Vol. II/4: Architecture IV–Armenia and Iran IV. London and New York: Routledge & Kegan Paul. pp. 418–438. ISBN 978-0-71009-104-8.
- Garsoïan, Nina G. (1980). Iran and Caucasia (PDF). Kennan Institute for Advanced Russian Studies.
- Garsoïan, Nina G. (1989). The Epic Histories Attributed to Pʻawstos Buzand (Buzandaran Patmutʻiwnkʻ). Cambridge, MA: Harvard University Press. ISBN 0-674-25865-7.
- Garsoïan, Nina G. (1997a). "The Emergence of Armenia". In Hovannisian, Richard G. (ed.). The Armenian People from Ancient to Modern Times. Vol. 1. New York: St. Martin's Press. ISBN 0-312-10169-4.
- Garsoïan, Nina G. (1997b). "The Aršakuni Dynasty". In Hovannisian, Richard G. (ed.). The Armenian People from Ancient to Modern Times. Vol. 1. New York: St. Martin's Press. ISBN 0-312-10169-4.
- Garsoïan, Nina G. (2005). "Naxarar". In Yarshater, Ehsan (ed.). Encyclopædia Iranica (Online ed.). Encyclopædia Iranica Foundation.
- Toumanoff, Cyril (1963). Studies in Christian Caucasian History. Washington, D.C.: Georgetown University Press. OCLC 505712128.
