= Amphipole =

Archons of the city of Syracuse

Amphipoles, in antiquity, were archons, or chief magistrates, of the city of Syracuse. They were first established by Timoleon, after his expulsion of Dionysius the Elder, tyrant of Syracuse. They governed Syracuse for a space of three hundred years, and Diodorus Siculus wrote that they subsisted even in his time (c. 90 BC to c. 30 BC).
