= Kolakretai =

The kolakretai or kolagretai (Ancient Greek: κωλακρέται or κωλαγρέται) were very ancient magistrates at Athens, who had the management of all financial matters in the time of the kings, at least as early as the 7th century BC.

They are said to have derived their name from collecting certain parts of the victims at sacrifices (ἐκ τοῦ ἀγείρειν τὰς κωλᾶς), from kola, a Greek noun meaning "limbs". The legislation of Solon left the kolakretai untouched, but Cleisthenes deprived them of the charge of the finances, which he transferred to the apodektai, who were established in their stead. From this time, the kolakretai had only to provide for the meals in the Prytaneum, and subsequently had likewise to pay the fees to the dikastes, when the practice of paying the dikastes was introduced by Pericles. They are not mentioned in any literature or inscription after 411 BC, and it is likely the office was abolished at that time, and some or all of their remaining functions were assumed by the apodektai.
