= Tanuter =

Tanuter (Old Armenian: տանուտէր, literally house + lord) was the head of an Armenian nakharar house in ancient and medieval Armenia; the term is equivalent to the Persian arbab. Prior to the Russian annexation of Eastern Armenia in 1828, the village headmen of a melikdom carried the title.
