= Aspet =

Hereditary military title

Aspet (Armenian: ասպետ) (Note: Rendered as Ἄσπετ and Ἀσπέτων in the Greek version of the history attributed to Agathangelos.) was a hereditary title held by the Bagratuni princely house in the ancient Kingdom of Armenia. Related to the Middle Persian title aspbed (or aspbad), meaning 'commander of the cavalry', in the Armenian context it appears to have been a purely honorary title not reflecting a real military role.

== Etymology and significance ==
The name has been derived from either the Old Persian *viθa/visapati 'head of the clan'; according to Cyril Toumanoff a more likely etymon is *aspapati, from which derives the Middle Persian aspbed (or aspbad) which designated the Iranian office of Master of the Horse (commander of the cavalry). The Armenian army was comprised overwhelmingly of cavalry, under the command of the sparapet (commander-in-chief, translated by Toumanoff as 'High Constable'); this left no room for a Master of the Horse. Armenian historians of the Arsacid period hardly ever mention any Bagratunis in command of the king's forces. Like the małkhaz of the Khorkhoruni family, aspet seems to have been a special, familial title of the Bagratunis, who were briefly called the Aspetuni after their title. The title was no longer used after the Arab conquest of Armenia. The title of aspet may be the result of the Armenian Arsacids imitation of Parthia, where one of the Seven Great Houses bore the name of Aspahbad. Hakob Manandyan regarded the two titles of the Bagratunis, aspet and tʻagadir 'coronant, crowner', as reflections of a single office held by them called the tʻagakap aspetutʻiwn, which came with the privilege of crowning the Armenian king during his coronation ceremony.

== Later use ==
The name of the Aspietai, a Byzantine noble family of Armenian origin, is derived from aspet. In modern Armenian, the word aspet refers to medieval European knights (or, figuratively, to a chivalrous or magnanimous person).
