= Samdzimari =

Goddess in Georgian mythology

Samdzimari (also Samdzivari; Georgian: სამძიმარი, "necklace-wearer") is a fertility and oracular goddess from Georgian mythology. She was worshipped in the historical regions of Khevsureti and Pshavi in northeastern Georgia. Like the Svan hunting goddess Dali, who is attested in northwestern Georgia, Samdzimari was traditionally depicted as a beautiful blond-haired seductress with dominion over wild spaces. She was the sister-spouse of Giorgi, (Note: In Khevsureti, Saint George is known as Giorgi. In Svan he is called Jgëræg, also transliterated as Dzhgyrag.) the Khevsur deity derived from the Christian figure Saint George.

== Mythological origins ==
Samdzimari is one of three daughters of the demonic king of the Kajes, (Note: Also transliterated as Kadzhi.) a wealthy race of demons with a supernatural talent for blacksmithing and metalworking who lived in an underworld kingdom called Kajeti, sometimes represented as the land of the dead. Giorgi comes to Kajeti, either by stealth – smuggled into the army's stronghold sewn into a horse's skin – or by strength – accompanied by a group of other divine patrons – and conquers the Kaj army. He loots the land of its treasure, metalworking equipment, a one-horned cow, and the king's daughters, and returns to the surface. At a shrine, Samdzimari is made Giorgi's sister-spouse and is thereafter regarded as a deity.

Georgian scholar Zurab Kiknadze regarded this story as being derived from the Christian story of Saint George and the Dragon, in which Saint George rescues a princess from a dragon and converts her to Christianity. Anthropologist Kevin Tuite disputed that connection to an extent, stating that "the symbolic opposition imposed on these personnages [Giorgi and Samdzimari] has no precedent in Orthodox hagiography".

== Depiction and associations ==
Samdzimari is generally depicted as a beautiful woman with long blond hair, adorned with gold jewellery and wearing gold slippers. She had the ability to change her shape, and travelled the earth in the form of a mortal woman. She had sexual liaisons with various priests and oracles, often while disguised as women known to them. In some instances, she was said to turn into a wild beast or vanish at the moment of a man's orgasm. In one story, she visits a shrine and comes across the holy man Kholiga Abuletauri. She lives with him as his wife until her mother-in-law discovers her magically shaping a gold ring in a pot of molten butter. She changes back into her true form and flies away.

Her liaisons with holy men either symbolize or enhance the oracular powers of these priests, depending on the interpretation. Georges Charachidzé, a French-Georgian scholar of Caucasian culture, regarded her main function as restorative. Samdzimari would possess a priest who had lost his connection with the gods and thereby restore his connection to the divine. Author Michael Berman regarded her role in these situations as essentially shamanic, serving as an intermediary between the mortal world and the divine. Other scholars have interpreted her intermediary role as a replacement for the religious roles of real women, which were appropriated by male oracles.

Samdzimari was regarded as a patroness of marriage, which she is said to have created with Giorgi. She also watches over female activities such as childbirth, foraging for herbs, and milking of cows.

Georgian culture drew strong associations between death and dairy livestock, and Samdzimari was entwined with both. Like Samdzimari, cattle were first brought from the underworld to the surface by Giorgi. Both were seen as retaining characteristics of this corrupt origin, which sometimes resurfaced to make them dangerous, as in Samdzimari's grotesque transformations after sexual intercourse. Similarly, dairy products, especially butter, were regarded as life-giving but potentially deadly since they could become spoiled. Butter, sometimes mixed with milk, was often used in funeral rites and other rituals pertaining to the dead. Farmers whose dairy products had spoiled would be advised to make sacrifices to Samdzimari, with her underworld origins, to prevent it from reoccurring.

Although she was not primarily a hunting deity, her name was sometimes invoked by hunters for luck, and the horns of deer and ibex were sometimes offered to her after a successful hunt. Because of these associations, Georgian folklorist Mikheil Chikovani considered her to be the northeastern equivalent of the Svan hunting goddess Dali. Like Dali, she was also a patron of untamed spaces: one Khevsur legend describes a shepherdess accidentally encountering Samdzimari in an untouched clearing.

== Epithets and etymology ==
It is believed that her name is derived from the Georgian word mdziv, meaning bead or necklace. Georges Charachidzé believed that the name Samzdimari was actually a descriptive epithet and not her original name. It was characteristic for central Caucasian cultures to replace sacred words such as the names of divine beings with substitutes; this lexical replacement was driven by taboos against speaking the true words.

The Samdzimari Corona on Venus is named for Samdzimari.

== Bibliography ==
- Berman, Michael (2008). The Shamanic Themes in Georgian Folktales. Newcastle: Cambridge Scholars Publishing. ISBN 978-1-84718-586-0.
- Charachidzé, Georges (1960). "Travail et mort dans la montagne géorgienne". L'Ethnographie (in French). 54. L'Entretemps éditions: 45–62.
- Charachidzé, Georges (1968). Le Système religieux de la Géorgie païenne: analyse structurale d'une civilisation (in French). Paris: La Découverte. OCLC 410367044.
- Charachidzé, Georges (15 May 1993). "The Religion and Myths of the Georgians of the Mountains". In Bonnefoy, Yves (ed.). American, African, and Old European Mythologies. Translated by Doniger, Wendy. University of Chicago Press. pp. 254–262. ISBN 9780226064574.
- Mahé, Jean-Pierre (2008). "Le mythe d'Ištar dans l'oralité caucasienne". Comptes rendus des séances de l'Académie des Inscriptions et Belles-Lettres. 152 (1): 215–230. doi:10.3406/crai.2008.92117.
- Monaghan, Patricia (1 April 2014). Encyclopedia of Goddesses and Heroines. Novato, California: New World Library. ISBN 978-1-60868-217-1.
- Tserediani, Nino; Tuite, Kevin; Bukhrashvili, Paata (19 February 2018). "Women as Bread-Bakers and Ritual-Makers: Gender, Visibility, and Sacred Space in Upper Svaneti". In Darieva, Tsypylma; Mühlfried, Florian; Tuite, Kevin (eds.). Sacred Places, Emerging Spaces: Religious Pluralism in the Post-Soviet Caucasus. Berghahn Books. ISBN 978-1-78533-783-3.
- Tuite, Kevin (1996). "Highland Georgian paganism — archaism or innovation?" (PDF). Annual of the Society for the Study of Caucasia. 7: 79–91.
- Tuite, Kevin, ed. (2004b) [Originally published in 1995 as Anthology of Georgian folk poetry]. Violet on the Mountain: An Anthology of Georgian Folk Poetry (revised ed.). Tsibli: Amirani. Part 1 Part 2.
- Tuite, Kevin (20 February 2006). "The meaning of Dæl. Symbolic and spatial associations of the south Caucasian goddess of game animals." (PDF). In O’Neil, Catherine; Scoggin, Mary; Tuite, Kevin (eds.). Language, Culture and the Individual. A Tribute to Paul Friedrich. University of Montreal. pp. 165–188.
