= Dali (goddess) =

Hunting goddess from Georgian mythology

Dali as depicted by Svan artist Vakhtang Oniani, from a Georgian translation of the Svan ballad Givergil (Georgian: გივერგილ), published in 1969

Dali (also Daal or Dæl; Georgian: დალი) is a goddess from the mythology of the Georgian people of the Caucasus region. She is a hunting goddess who serves as the patron of hoofed wild mountain animals such as ibexes and deer. Hunters who obeyed her numerous taboos would be assured of success in the hunt; conversely, she would harshly punish any who violated them. She is most prominently attested in the stories of the Svan ethnic subgroup in northwestern Georgia. Other groups in western Georgia had similar figures considered equivalent to Dali, such as the Mingrelian goddess Tkashi-Mapa (Mingrelian: ტყაში-მაფა). (Note: Also transliterated as T'qashi Mapa.)

She was usually described as a beautiful nude woman with golden hair and glowing skin, although she sometimes took on the form of her favored animals, usually with some marking to differentiate her from the herd. She was said to reside in a cavern high in the mountains, where she kept watch over the hoofed game animals who live on the cliffs. Dali was styled with a variety of regional epithets reflecting her different roles and associations.

Stories of the Svan people depict her taking human lovers and killing them out of jealousy, giving birth to sons such as the culture hero Amirani, and later clashing with her rival Saint George. (Note: In Georgian, Saint George is known as Giorgi. In Svan he is called Jgëræg, also transliterated as Dzhgyrag.) Some myths depict her working alongside other forest deities, and she is sometimes accompanied by the legendary hunting dog Q'ursha. After the rise of Christianity in Georgia, Dali's importance as a goddess waned, which was reflected in changes to stories told about her. Saint George was presented as having the power to overrule her, and she began to be conflated with a malicious nature spirit called the ali.

Many authors have described parallels between Dali and stories from other mythologies. As a patron of the hunt associated with hoofed beasts, she has been compared with Artemis of Greek mythology, a Scottish hag called the glaistig, and the maiden who tames the unicorn. Her associations with gold, seduction, and the morning star have led scholars to draw connections with goddesses such as Aphrodite and Ishtar, who have similar mythological themes.

Her story remains an important part of Georgian cultural consciousness, and she is often referenced with eponyms and literary allusions. Although younger people treat her as a figure from mythology, some older hunters still consider her to be a real figure one might encounter deep in the forest.

== Origins ==
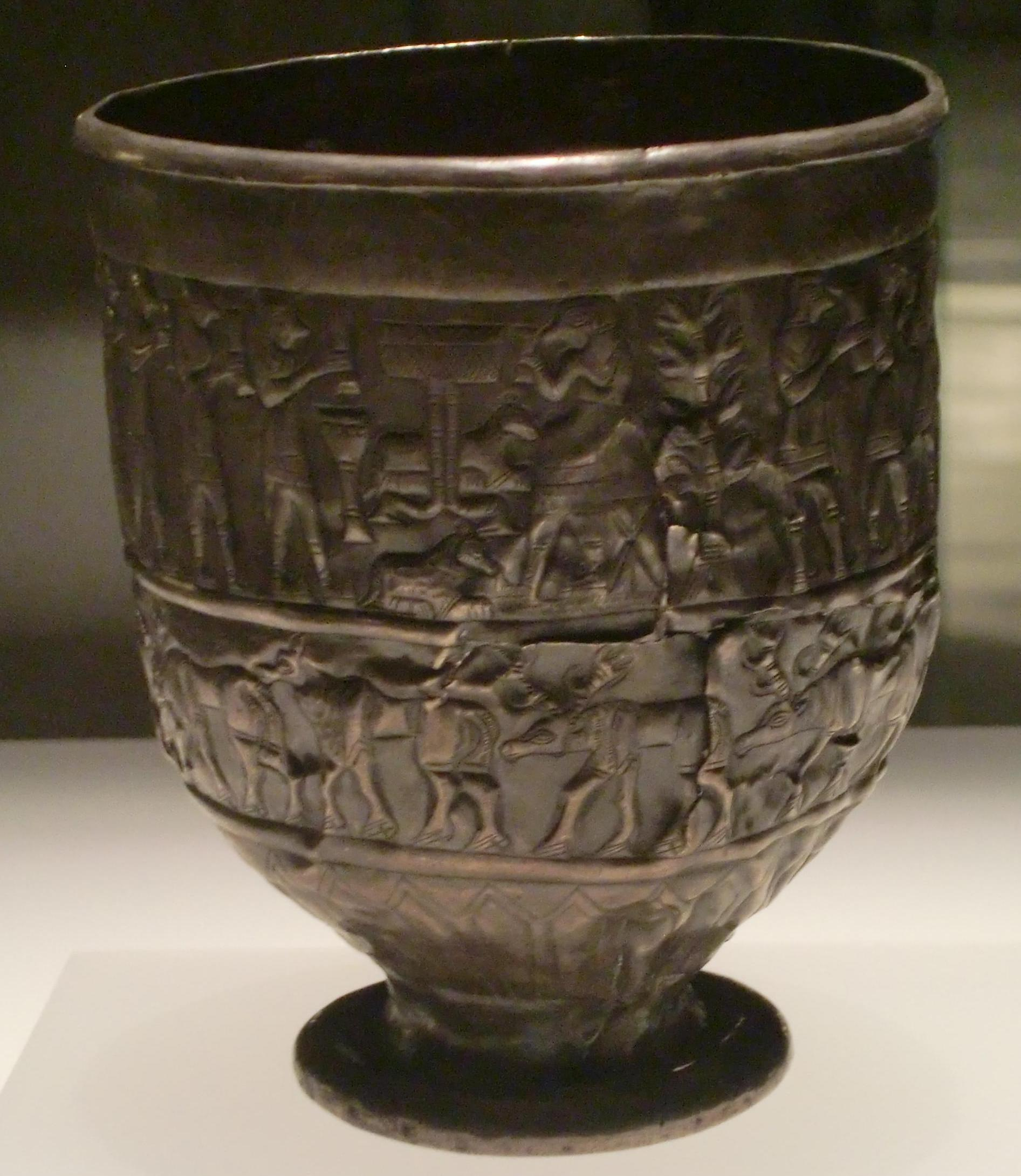
Seated figure and procession on the front of the Trialeti Chalice

Dali is attested primarily in surviving pieces of Svan folklore: myths, ballads, and round-dance songs. Linguistic anthropologist Kevin Tuite regards the surviving texts as fragmentary, representing "but a tiny fraction of the texts that would have been in circulation in the Svaneti of a few centuries ago". He also noted that most of these pieces would have been performed and likely composed by men, leaving any female perspective of Dali unclear.

Dali is also attested in oral traditions recorded in modern academic fieldwork by Georgian academics such as Vera Bardavelidze in the 1930s and Elene Virsaladze in the 1950s–1970s. According to Virsaladze, Georgian culture exhibits an extraordinary degree of live retention of ancient folklore and traditions, possibly from as far back as 3,300 years ago.

It has been suggested that Dali, along with numerous other deities of Georgian mythology, had her origins in a lost common religion of the Kartvelian peoples. Variations on this idea were supported by the Georgian historians Nikolai Marr and Ivane Javakhishvili, both of whom independently theorized that the similarities in folklore between the various Georgian ethnic groups indicated a common religious origin. Dating the origin of this religion, and therefore of Dali in particular, may be impossible due to the lack of surviving written sources. The only thing that can be stated definitively is that these beliefs predate the adoption of Christianity in Georgia, which archaeological evidence indicates began as early as the 3rd century.

Some archaeological artifacts have been suggested to have a connection to Dali. Folklorist Mikheil Chikovani considered the Trialeti Chalice, a Georgian artifact from approximately the 2nd millennium BCE, to depict a round dance or ritual dedicated to a goddess of the hunt comparable to Dali. He connected the motif of the animals on the lower portion of the chalice to the hoofed animals which Dali protected. Folklorist David Hunt also suggested the Chalice could be a depiction of a mistress of beasts. Some historians have speculated that certain Phasian drachma coins from the 4th to 5th century may have depicted Dali or her precursors, although numismatist John Hind argued against these interpretations in a 2005 paper.

=== Etymology and epithets ===
Distribution of the Kartvelian languages of the South Caucasus

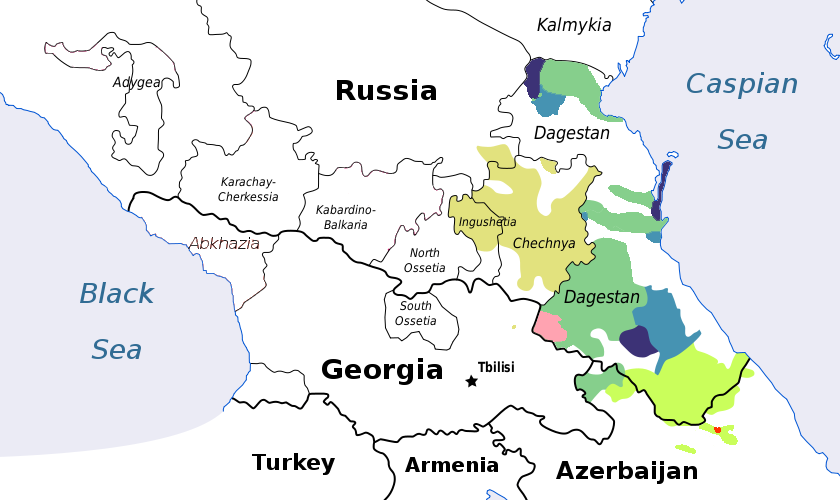
Distribution of Northeast Caucasian languages, including the Nakh languages

The etymology of Dali's name is unclear. Although many figures in Georgian mythology have origins in figures from the early Georgian Orthodox Church, Dali is not among them. It has been suggested that the name comes from the Georgian word dila, meaning "morning", or the Ossetian word dælimon meaning "demon", but these links are disputed. Tuite has linked the name to the various words for "god" in the Nakh languages, a group of languages in the Northeast Caucasian language family: "Chechen dēla, Ingush dǣlə, Bats dalě". These words can refer to Allah specifically, or can be used as a general term for pre-Islamic deities in the region. It was characteristic for central Caucasian cultures to replace sacred words with substitutes; this lexical replacement was driven by taboos against speaking the true words. Tuite believed Dali might originally have had a Svan name that gradually became replaced by the Nakh term for "god" as a result of this process.

Dali and her equivalents were also known by various epithets, reflecting local perceptions of the goddess's role or associations. At times she was simply called "Radiant", in reference to her extraordinary beauty. When focusing on her association with New Year's Eve, she was referred to with the epithet of Dæl Ešxwmiš, or "Dali of New Year's Eve". The Svan called her "the Queen Dali". Because she was said to live high in the mountains, she was sometimes referred to as "Dali of the Rocks". In the Racha and Kakheti regions she was called "the Mistress of Beasts" and the "Angel of the Crags". The name Tkashi-Mapa, used by the Mingrelians, translates as "the Queen of the Woods" or "the Sovereign of the Forest".

== Depiction ==
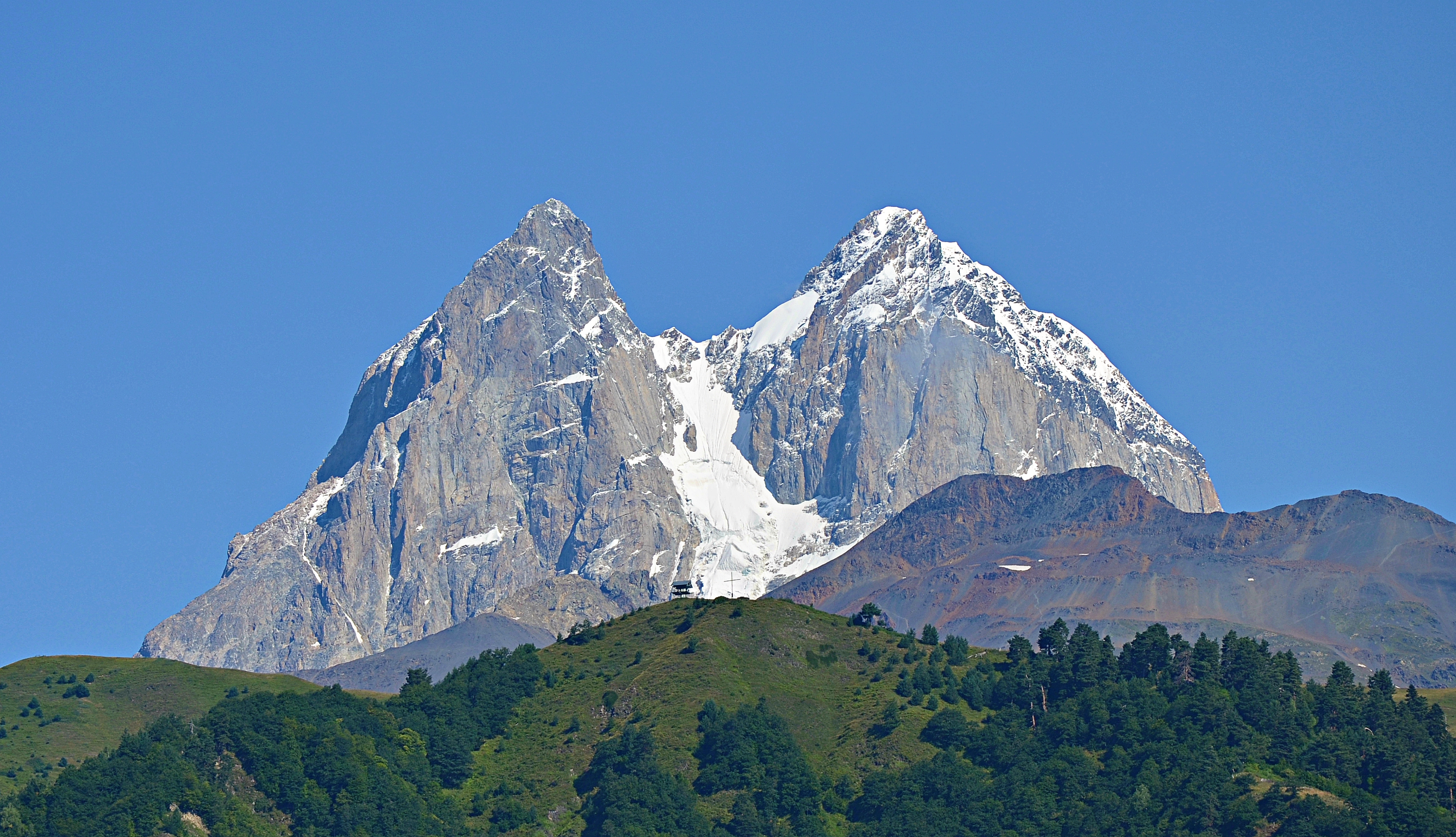
Ushba, the double-peaked mountain where Dali was sometimes said to live

Traditionally, Dali lived in a cavern high up in the mountains, far away from human settlement. Some traditions specified her home was the distinctive double-peaked mountain Ushba, whose ice-covered south face was sometimes called Dalis panjara, the Window of Dali (Georgian: დალის ფანჯარა). The cave's exact location varied; it could be on the side of a glacier, or at the summit of the mountain. Sometimes the entrance was concealed by a rock door which Dali opened and closed to hide her dwelling. Rarely, Dali and her flock lived inside an enormous hollowed-out spruce tree. As a rule, Dali did not enter civilized spaces such as villages except on rare occasions, such as the funerals of her human lovers. Her nighttime cries could injure people and damage her surroundings, and her rage could cause blizzards and avalanches.

Dali was usually described as a beautiful young woman with long braided hair. She was most often portrayed as nude, occasionally wearing gold jewellery. If she wore clothes, they were white. Her skin was so white it was literally radiant. Her beauty was extraordinary: "both irresistible and terrible", it could drive a man to madness if he even spoke to her.

Dali's long hair was an important component of her mythology. Her hair was gold-colored; in some cases, it was actually made of gold, and shone like the sun. Some stories depicted this gleaming aspect as fire, describing the goddess leaving "little tongues of flame" in her wake, although this is less prevalent. She would sit on the cliffs combing her hair with a golden comb. In some tales, Dali used her supernaturally-strong hair to bind hunters who wronged her. In one story, she used it to strangle a hunter who had stolen one of her hairs to string his hunting bow.

Although strong enough to string a bow with, her hair was not invulnerable; indeed, using Dali's hair to threaten, harm, or kill her was a recurring motif. Multiple tales depict hunters grabbing or cutting Dali's hair in order to subdue and rape her. This tactic did not necessarily prevent the goddess from later taking revenge. In a story about Dali's Mingrelian equivalent Tkashi-Mapa, the goddess agrees to marry a hunter when he threatens to cut off her luxurious hair. He eventually grows tired of her endlessly washing and combing it, and hides her prized comb so she will stop. She destroys his family, killing one of his children and stealing another, and curses his entire line of descendants.

Women could also use Dali's hair against her. In one of the major Dali stories, a woman discovers her husband sleeping with Dali. She cuts Dali's hair off in a rage, killing her or banishing her from the world. A superstition recorded in 1971 described how a woman whose man had been away hunting too long might cut her own hair off, praying that God would cut Dali's hair in return, which would force the goddess to allow her husband to return home. In one unusual variation of the hair-cutting motif, a woman wishing to rid her son or her husband of Dali's influence sneaks up on the goddess while she is sleeping and washes her hair, sometimes in deer's milk. Dali is rendered so powerless, or so grateful, by this act that she becomes the woman's servant. Her Mingrelian equivalent could be dismissed with a similar method, using milk from a black cow instead of a deer.

== Primary motifs ==
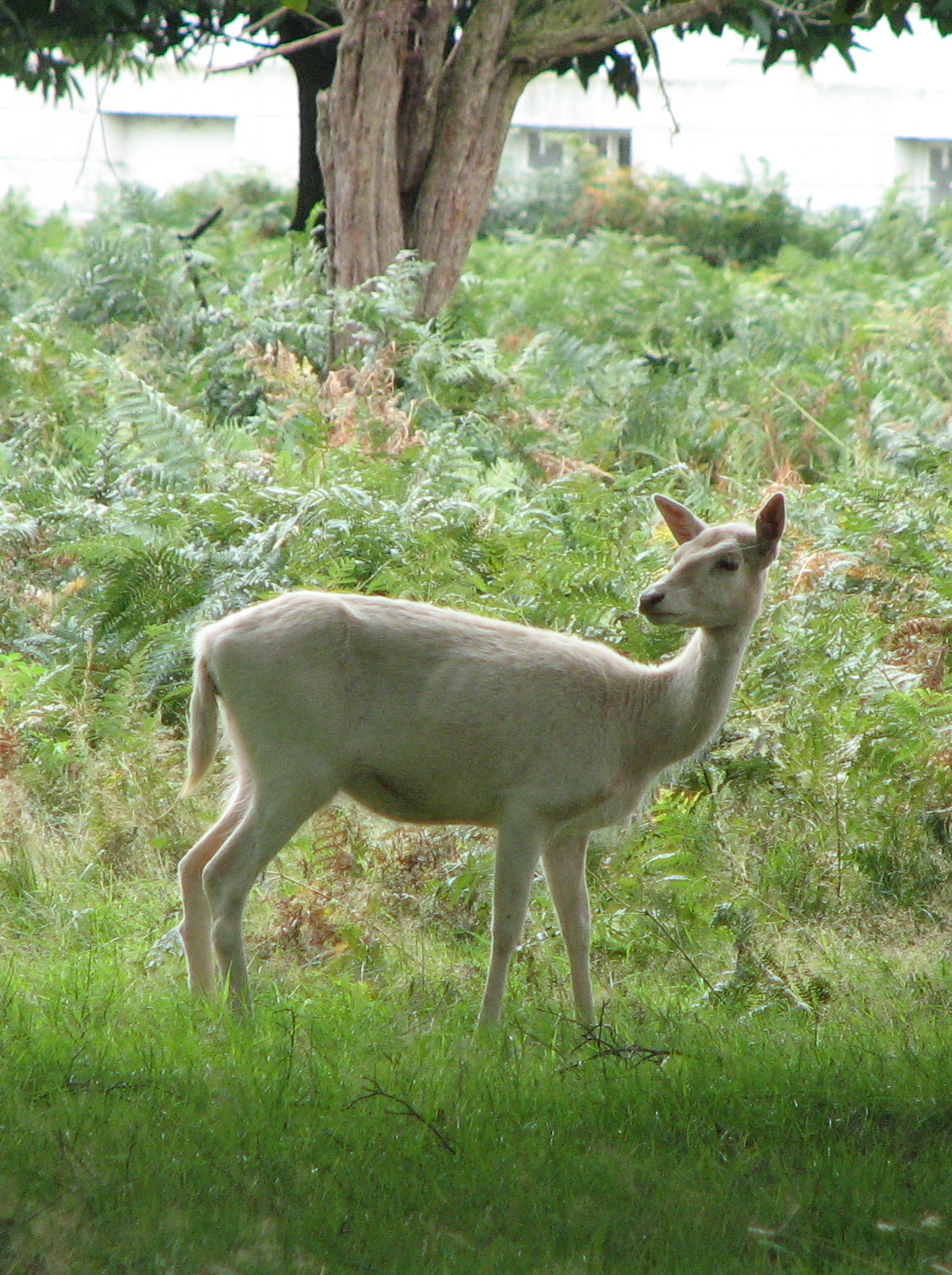
A white deer, one of Dali's preferred animal forms

=== Game animals and hunting ===
Dali's primary mythological role was that of the mistress and guardian of hoofed game animals of the mountain. She protected her charges, which included deer, ibex, wild sheep, and goat-antelopes like turs and chamois, just as a shepherd guards a flock. Some stories portray her milking her animals. She was responsible for granting favor or misfortune to hunters, punishing the greedy and ensuring there would always be enough game to go around.

Stories involving Dali often feature animals that have been marked as special: either they are Dali's favorites among the herd, or they are the goddess herself in the form of an animal. Examples of these special features include a purely white coat, unusual markings, or golden horns. Dali could vary her size in both her animal and her human forms. When she took the shape of her favored animals, they were often significantly larger or smaller than the usual animals of that kind. She could also make her human form very small: in eastern Georgia, hunters would leave tiny pairs of shoes on the cliffs as an offering to her.

Several tales recorded by Georgian folklorist Elene Virsaladze reflect the deadly consequences for a hunter who wounded or killed one of Dali's marked beasts, or hunted too greedily. Two stories describe Dali cursing a hunter's family such that his sons, and later the hunter himself, died as a result. Another story describes Dali destroying the town of Nakvderi with an avalanche as revenge after a hunter wounded a tur marked by the goddess. In another story, a hunter killed a doe and its fawn, and was cursed by the herd's protector to never have any descendants of his own.

One Svan story describes the consequences for three brothers who follow one of Dali's mountain goats up into the crags and attempt to shoot it. The first two brothers both miss the goat, and are attacked and killed by Dali, who has been hiding in her cave nearby watching. The third brother watches the goat vanish into Dali's cave, and hides. Dali eventually emerges. The hunter leaps out of hiding, grabs her by the hair, and rapes her. She then becomes his mistress. The story's unusual inclusion of a hunter who overpowers Dali may indicate that it took some influence from an Ossetian legend involving two brothers overcoming a deer-herding witch.

=== Appeasement through taboos and offerings ===
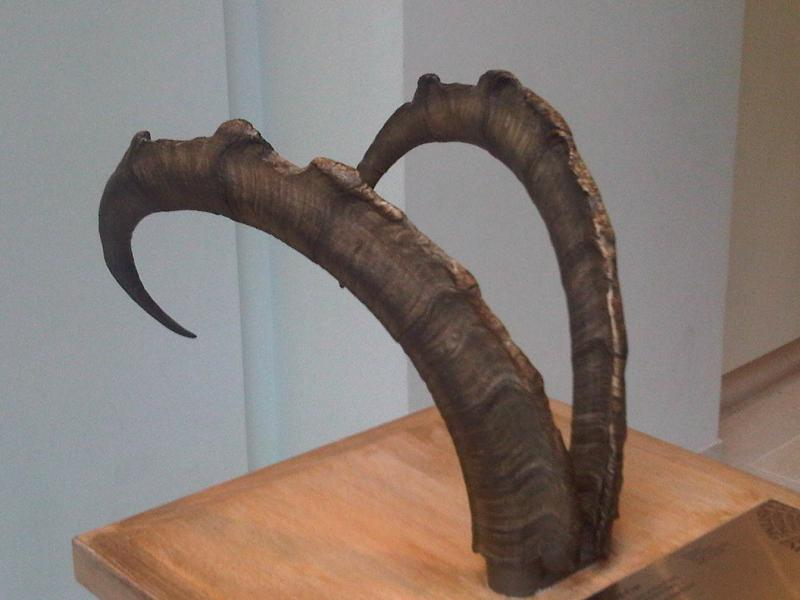
The horns of a bezoar ibex, which is native to the Georgian mountains

Despite her protectiveness towards her animals, Dali was not necessarily hostile to hunters, and would even grant them blessings if they respected certain taboos and made appropriate offerings to her. These taboos typically revolved around concerns about spiritual purity and prevention of overhunting. Offerings usually involved small personal sacrifices given before and after the hunt.

Dali was perceived as extremely sensitive to any kind of spiritual pollution entering her mountains, which were considered pure and therefore sacred. She demanded that hunters abstain from the hunt if they were impure in any of a number of ways. Impurity usually originated from women and blood, but could also come from use of foul language, commission of adulterous acts, and association with dead bodies. On the night before a hunt, hunters had to refrain from intercourse with any women, even their wives. They had to avoid any contact, sexual or otherwise, with any woman who was menstruating or in childbirth. The wives of hunters were also subject to behavioral taboos. In some regions, "the wives of huntsmen were traditionally forbidden to wash, comb, or unplait their hair" while their husbands were out on the hunt. In an extension of the hunter's menstrual taboo, women were not permitted to eat meat from the hunt while menstruating, pregnant, or in childbirth.

Hunting was treated as a sacred act among the Svan. The hunt began with a sacrifice of a ceremonial bread, called lamsir, which was offered to Dali with a prayer. Hunters were taught to not kill more beasts than they could carry, usually one for each man in the hunting party. If their efforts were successful, hunters would make an offering of organ meat to Dali in thanksgiving. In some traditions, the horns of the animal would be consecrated to Dali once the hunters returned to their village.

It was believed that hunters who respected these taboos and made correct offerings, thereby avoiding ritual impurity, would always find enough game to ensure they and their families were fed. Conversely, hunters who became impure by failing to abide by taboos and restrictions could be punished by Dali in a number of ways ranging from failure to find game all the way to death by fatal fall. It was sometimes possible to abate Dali's rage after a transgression with appropriate offerings, as in one story where an offering of sacred bread prevented Dali from destroying a village by flooding the Inguri River.

=== Seduction and jealousy ===
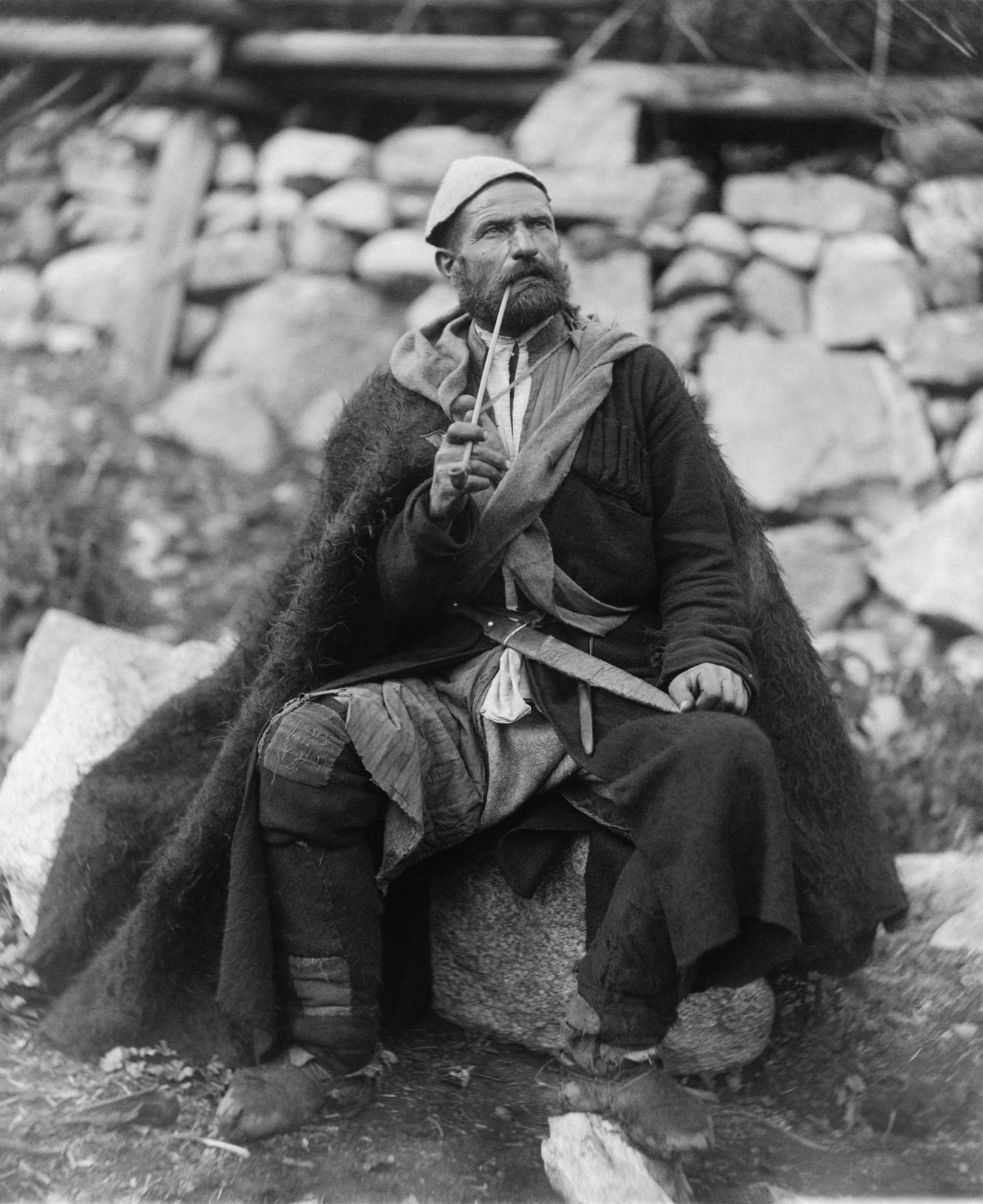
A Svan hunter in traditional garb

Stories involving Dali often depict her taking mortal hunters as lovers, bringing both blessings and peril to the hunter. In an inversion of traditional gender roles, it is the goddess who chooses the hunter and initiates the affair. Often, her target was a hunter who had done her a favor such as protecting her from a pursuer. She would give her lover tokens of affection such as beads, jewellery, or small objects like scissors, which he was required to keep hidden from everyone. A hunter who became Dali's lover would be guaranteed success in the hunt. The goddess might even protect the hunter from human assailants and heal his wounds. In return, he was prohibited from revealing the secret of his good fortune, and from taking any mortal lovers for the duration of the affair.

Engaging in an affair with Dali was a dangerous undertaking. Dali's beauty would inflame the hunter's passions to the point of near-madness, a state that was referred to as being "dalelukdune, Dali-possessed" (Georgian: დალელუქდუნე). Afflicted hunters would wander the wilderness aimlessly waiting for the goddess to find them. After the affair was consummated, any appearance of infidelity on the hunter's part would incur the goddess's wrath. He could be attacked by her animals or lured to his death upon a dangerous cliff. Dali's Mingrelian equivalent was known to petrify hunters who offended her. Even if a hunter did survive the liaison, he might be unable to take a mortal lover for the remainder of his life for fear of angering the goddess.

It was possible for a wily hunter to negotiate terms with Dali, such as limiting the length of the affair, or securing the right to marry a mortal at a later time. As long as the hunter's terms were set before the affair began, Dali would respect them. Some traditions held that a hunter could safely end an affair with Dali by giving his undergarments to a male guest, who would become the new focus of Dali's affections, allowing the original hunter to marry without enraging the goddess.

Even death did not end Dali's obsessive behavior toward her beloved hunters. She would come down from the mountains into villages to grieve dramatically over the bodies of hunters, even those whose deaths she was responsible for in the first place. Some villages had family members stand guard over freshly buried bodies to prevent Dali from unearthing them to weep over. In others, the family would leave the hunter's body alone in the house, enabling Dali to dress the body and mourn over it for a short time.

Although not specifically regarded as a fertility goddess, two major myths depict Dali giving birth. In one, the goddess drops her infant after the birth. It is rescued by a hunter, to whom she offers a sexual liaison as a reward. In the second, Dali seduces a hunter, becomes pregnant, and gives birth to a demigod son who becomes a hero.

=== Times of transition ===
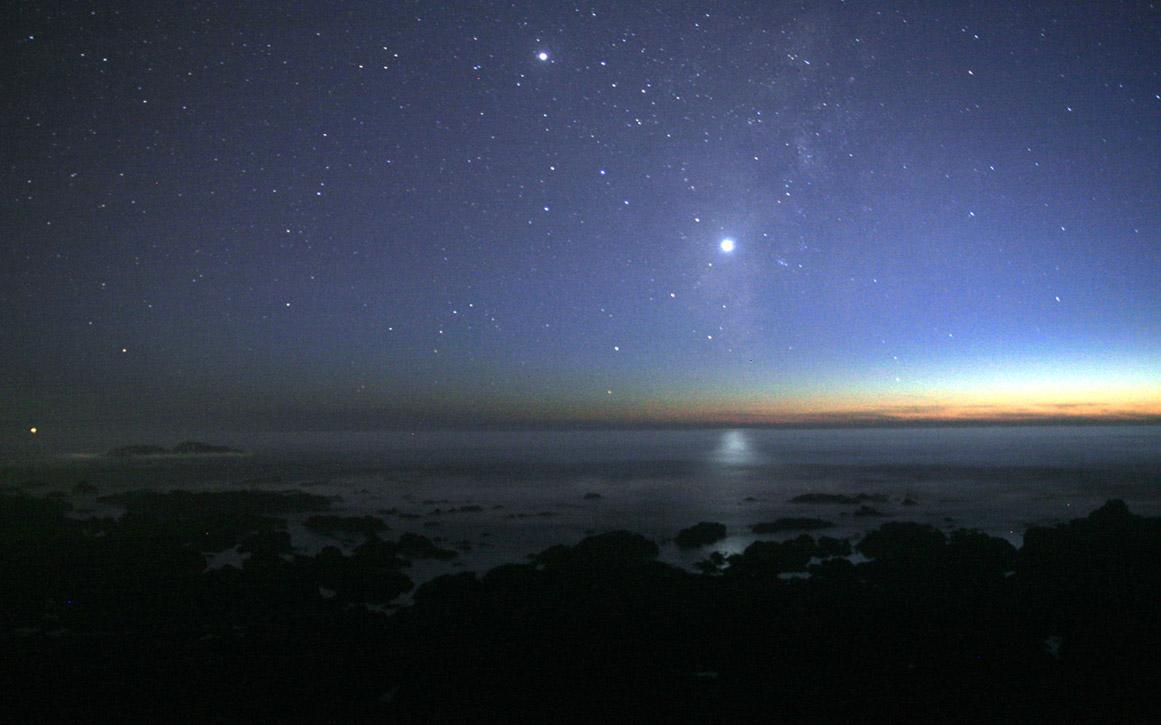
The planet Venus, sometimes referred to as the morning star

Although she is primarily a hunting deity, Dali has strong associations with symbols and states of transition such as dawn, the morning star, and New Year's Eve. Svan hunting lore placed significant emphasis on the morning star. Svan hunters were taught to leave their homes before dawn, and arrive at the hunting grounds by its light. Once at the hunting grounds, they would light a small fire and offer a prayer via the morning star to Dali and other hunting deities such as Apsat (Note: Apsat is the Svan name for this deity. In Ossetian, he is known as Aefsati.) (the god of small game) or Saint George (the patron of hunters). In the story of the hunter Betkil, his death at Dali's hands is sometimes set at the moment the morning star appears in the sky, or the moment the night becomes dawn.

Dali was also celebrated on New Year's Eve as the bringer of a peaceful transition from the old year to the new. During these celebrations, she was referred to with the epithet of Dæl Ešxwmiš, or "Dali of New Year's Eve". Both male and female heads of household would make offerings of special bread baked from consecrated grain to Dali of New Year's Eve. Georgian ethnologist Vera Bardavelidze documented a number of different forms of this sacred bread from various villages based on fieldwork she conducted in the 1930s. Some loaves would be kept until spring, where they would be crumbled and sown into the earth at a planting festival.

== Mythology ==
=== Affair with Betkil ===
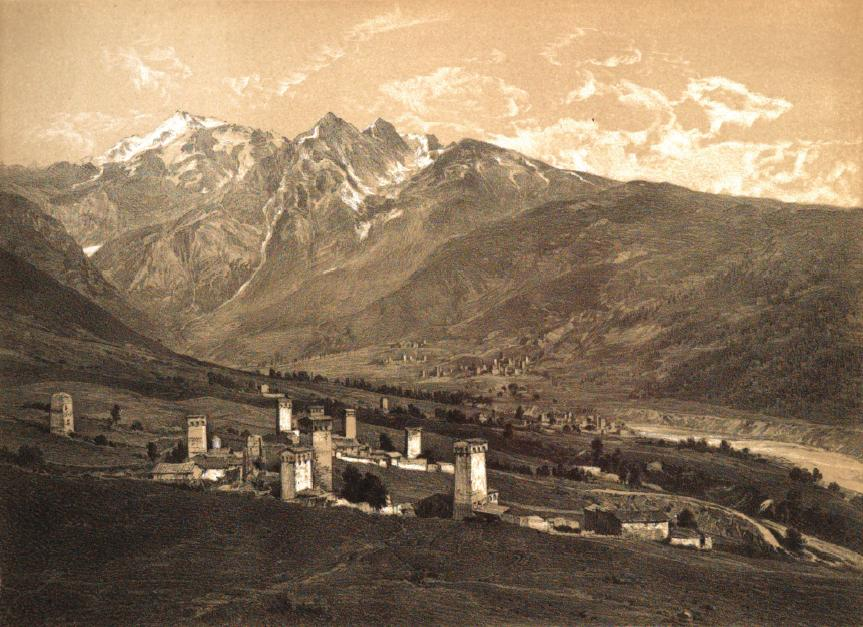
Traditional towers in the villages Mulakhi and Muzhali, c. 1875

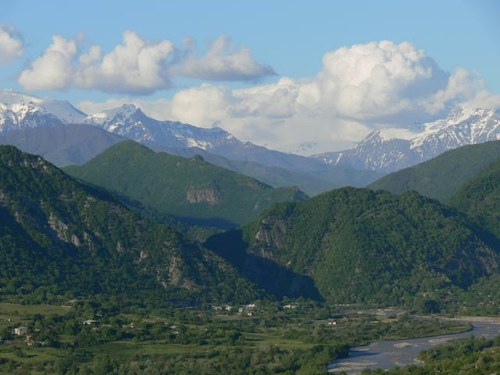
Mountains surrounding the village of Ghebi

The most well-known of Dali's affairs is her dalliance with the legendary hunter Betkil or Betgil, who falls to his death from a high cliff after betraying Dali's affections. The story is depicted in the traditional Svan circle dance songs Bail Betkil, Betkan Kutsa and Betkani. These dances were performed in the Racha region of western Georgia each year on the third Sunday following Easter, at the bottom of the cliff where Betkil is believed to have died. The exact location is uncertain: Tuite mentions the Free Svaneti communes of Mulakhi and Muzhali, while folklorist Anna Chaudhri pinpoints the village of Ghebi. The annual performance of these dances was linked to a ritual meant to summon the rain.

The story begins with Dali selecting and pursuing Betkil. She gives him a token of her favor (Tuite translates it as "a bead, ring, or charm") and demands that he abstain from the touch of mortal females, including his own wife. For a time he is faithful to her and his hunts are always fruitful. Eventually, he breaks his vow with a mortal woman – most often his wife, but occasionally his sister-in-law – and this woman steals the goddess's love-token. In a rage, Dali transforms herself into a white deer or chamois and lures an unsuspecting Betkil from his village to the top of her mountain. The path closes, crumbles, or melts away behind him, forcing him to continue forward until he reaches the peak. There, Dali returns to her human form and angrily confronts Betkil about his betrayal and the loss of her token. The ground beneath Betkil's feet crumbles away entirely and leaves him hanging by one hand and one foot. Dali disappears, leaving Betkil to either jump or fall to his death. In some versions, prior to his death, Betkil entreats his family to grieve for him in various ways, and laments that his mortal lover allowed him to go out hunting while "impure".

In some variations of the Betkil story, he is accompanied up the mountain by the supernatural dog Q'ursha. (Note: From the Georgian Kur-shavi, meaning "black-eared", also transliterated as Kursha.) In this version, Betkil is trapped on the mountain for several days and runs out of food. Eventually, Q'ursha insists that Betkil kill and eat him to survive. In some versions he goes through with it. In others, he kills the hound but cannot bring himself to eat him. Finally, in other versions, he sends Q'ursha to his village for help instead. The villagers come to Betkil's aid and throw ropes to him, but Dali's mountain grows taller and taller and the ropes cannot reach him. Again, he falls to his death.

=== White Mangur ===
Another hunter, known as White Mangur, fares unusually well in his encounter with Dali. One version of the story, recorded by academic researchers and first published in 1939, describes Mangur as a famously prosperous hunter. One night he takes shelter in an empty cave. Dali arrives and demands that he explain his presence in her cave. Mangur explains that he was overtaken by nightfall and had no other shelter available. Dali remarks that if he were any other man, she would "arrange for you an unlucky return home", but says it would be a pity to harm a man like Mangur. Instead, she invites him to her bed. He protests briefly that he has a wife and child, but quickly relents, and they have an affair. She tells him she will give him plenty of game, and if he is ever in trouble to call her name. In the morning, White Mangur leaves Dali's cave, but is soon accosted by enemies. He kills nine of his enemies, but receives nine serious wounds in return. He calls out to Dali for help, and the goddess leaps from behind the crags and massacres Mangur's enemies with an ash branch. She heals his wounds at a touch and sends him home.

=== "Dali is Giving Birth on the Crags" ===
'I will offer him the choice of three things:
If he wants it, every day
We will give him a mountain goat;
Or else, then in September
We will make a present of nine turs,
Or else, then he will lie with me.'
'I do not dare to share your bed,
Make me a present of nine turs!'

— "Dali is Giving Birth on the Crags"
in Legends of the Caucasus, 2012

The story of Dali giving birth on the crags has been passed down as a song accompanied by a traditional circle dance, called Dælil k'ojas khelghwazhale in Svan (transl. Dali is Giving Birth on the Crags). Linguistic analysis corroborated by archaeological findings indicates that the song is of ancient origin.

The song begins with a hunter named Mepsay or Mepisa, who hears the goddess crying out in pain from childbirth. Immediately after giving birth, Dali drops the infant down the mountain, where it is snatched up by a waiting wolf. The hunter shoots the wolf and brings the infant back up the mountain to Dali. She offers the hunter a choice of reward: she will gift him with various game animals, or he can become her lover. He warily declines her offer of sexual favors and asks for success in the hunt. Later, he attempts to shoot an ibex with golden horns, not realizing that it is the goddess herself. His bullet ricochets off the ibex's horns and strikes him down, killing him. In this story, the name of the child's father and the fate of the child are never given.

=== Amirani ===
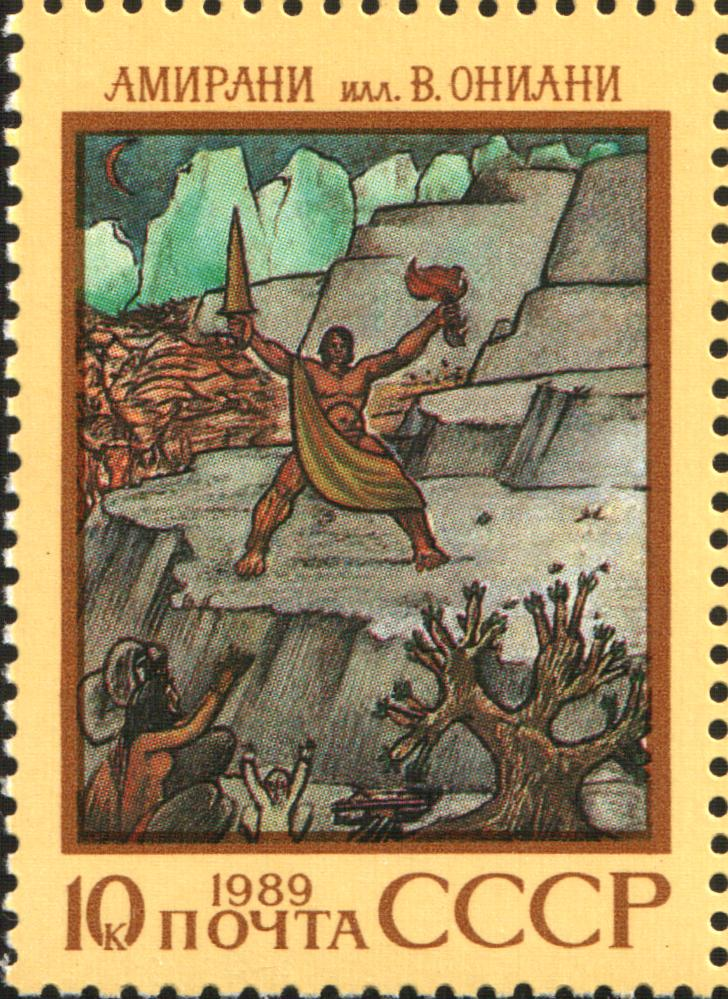
Amirani as depicted on a USSR postage stamp from 1989

The second of Dali's childbirth stories has more variations, but generally describes the conception and birth of the culture hero Amirani. In the most prominent version, a hunter finds Dali in the mountains, and she takes him as her lover. (Note: The hunter is often unnamed. In Svaneti, it may be a variation of Daredzhan; in Pshavi, in eastern Georgia, it may be Sulkalmakhi. In Abkhazia, Amirani has no father: it is a miraculous birth.) After several days together, they are discovered by his angry wife, who cuts off Dali's golden hair or ties her up with it. As a result, Dali is forced to abruptly leave the world. In some variations, the cutting of her hair kills her outright, in which case her pregnancy is discovered after her death. If banished, she announces that she is pregnant before departing, declaring that her child will be a powerful hero, though not as powerful as he would be had he been carried to term. In either case, her lover reluctantly cuts the infant from her womb. In some versions, the infant is premature and must be placed in the stomach of a bull (or the womb of a cow, or both) to complete gestation. Eventually he is left beside a spring, where he is found by either the Christian God or Saint George and baptized with the name Amirani. In some cases he is raised by the hunter, in others by a man named Iaman who raises him alongside his own sons.

In another version of Amirani's birth story, a mortal hunter cuts off Dali's braids while she sleeps and rapes her; she becomes pregnant. Later, an old hunter named Sulkalmakhi (Note: Also Sulukmakhi.) hears her wailing high in the cliffs, and climbs up to her. She tells him she is dying, and begs him to cut her infant free so he does not die with her. She tells Sulkalmakhi to name him Amirani and care for him as his own.

Although Amirani is generally depicted as Dali's son, there is a story from the Guria region called "Dali and Amirani" in which Dali, enraged by an unspecified offense, attempts to entrap an adult Amirani. While wandering the mountains with his dog, Amirani sees a flame and begins to follow it up the cliffs, eventually discovering that the flame is Dali's hair. Dali lures Amirani to the top of the mountain by saying she has been looking for him. His dog warns him of her ill intentions, but Amirani disregards the dog's advice and climbs up to meet her. When he reaches the very top of the mountain, Dali disappears and Amirani finds himself hung from the rocks by her hair. His dog, unable to reach him, convinces a bird to pluck the hair away. Just as the bird frees Amirani, Dali returns and curses the bird and its kind to be weak and useless. This is a variation on the story in which Dali strangles an unnamed hunter at the top of a mountain after he stole a hair to string his bow.

=== Saint George ===
St. George on the former Georgian coat of arms

Later Svan mythology depicts Dali in opposition to St. George. In Georgian mythology, Saint George is regarded as a deity whose primary function is the protection of "men exploiting the world outside their villages for the benefit of the community", such as shepherds, beekeepers, and most significantly, hunters. The Svan round dance song Monadire Chorla ("The Hunter Chorla"), a late variation of the Betkil story, depicts a significant clash between Dali and Saint George. In the song, a hunter named Chorla kills more than his share of ibexes, despite knowing this will anger the goddess. Dali punishes Chorla for his greed by binding him up on a treacherous cliff. Chorla sends his dog for help, and it returns with Saint George, who intervenes for Chorla as a reward for his faith in Jesus Christ. Saint George threatens to pollute or destroy the mountains with storms and landslides unless Dali releases Chorla, which she does. Furthermore, he places Chorla under his protection and declares that he can hunt without limit in the future.

Some versions of this story, such as the Svan ballads of the hunters Givergil and Kala, describe the hunter being tormented by a group of spirits, collectively referred to as the Dalis, rather than a singular goddess. In the ballad about Kala, the Dalis explicitly call Saint George their master when he threatens to destroy their territory. Tuite found this plural representation similar to the "St Georges" and "St Elijahs" of Ossetic mythology, which were groups of spirits sharing traits of the Christian saints they were named for. In contrast, Virsaladze found the change from singular goddess to coven of spirits to be a confirmation that Dali had been relegated to a secondary role in Svan hunting mythology.

=== Associated figures ===
Dali was not the only hunting deity worshipped by the Svans, and she was sometimes depicted working alongside others. Georges Charachidzé, a French-Georgian scholar of Caucasian culture, recorded that Dali worked with three other Svaneti forest gods to assist the Lord of the Bare Mountain, Ber Shishvlish. These deities were Apsat, the god of small game like fish and birds, Cxek'isk angelwez, the Angel of the Forest, who ruled over forest animals like foxes and bears, and Saint George, who was the patron of wolves and hunters. Mikheil Chikovani believed this multitude of deities represented a later development of the original matriarchal myth, in which Dali was the mistress of all beasts. Particularly, he saw Ber Shishvlish as an unsuccessful replacement for Dali.

Some groups in eastern Georgia viewed Apsat and Dali as siblings who each took a season in turn protecting herds of wild beasts. When Apsat was in charge of the animals, hunters were said to have an easy time making kills, but when Dali took over, she watched the animals closely, making it much harder for the hunters to bring them down. The Svaneti circle dance Metkhvar Mare praises both Dali and Apsat in these roles. In some instances, Apsat is represented as Dali's husband or son, or even her father, rather than her sibling. Tuite theorized that this partitioning of roles between the two deities was the result of Apsat being adapted into a pre-existing belief system which featured a female figure as the primary patron of game animals.

Another Georgian hunting deity, Ochopintre, (Note: Also Ochopinte.) is often mentioned alongside Dali. Some sources report that they worked together to herd and protect animals from hunters. In contrast, Virsaladze reports that the Khevsurian people of the Khevsureti region viewed the male Ochopintre as their primary hunting god. They had a figure called the "forest woman", an unnamed protector of deer, but she was treated as minor in comparison.

Some sources refer to Dali being accompanied by hunting dogs, sometimes specifically the legendary black-eared hunting dog Q'ursha. However, Q'ursha is not a consistent feature of Dali stories. He is more commonly depicted accompanying male hunters, including her son, Amirani, as well as the hunter Betkil.

=== Post-Christianization depiction ===
As Christianity became more prominent in Georgia, beginning with its arrival in the 3rd century, many pagan beliefs were altered or appropriated to fit Christian ideology. Dali's functions as the mistress of the hunt began to be shifted to Saint George, as in the story of the hunter Chorla. Ethnomusicologist Maka Khardziani identified Saint George's victory over Dali in the Chorla story as emblematic of the weakening of pagan beliefs in the face of Christian influence.

Variations on the Amirani story may also be indicative of Christian influence. Zaal Andronikashvili cites Chikovani as assuming that the Abkhazian version of Amirani's birth, in which Amirani is conceived miraculously without a father, was the oldest – and therefore matriarchal – version of his birth story. Mary Khukhunaishvili-Tsiklauri argued that stories in which a male hunter raises Amirani instead of Dali indicate an attempt by patriarchal and Christian influences to diminish the goddess's role. David Hunt suggested that the story in which Dali attempts to strangle an adult Amirani reflects a Christian rejection of the female goddess, who is reduced to a malicious and "witch-like" figure.

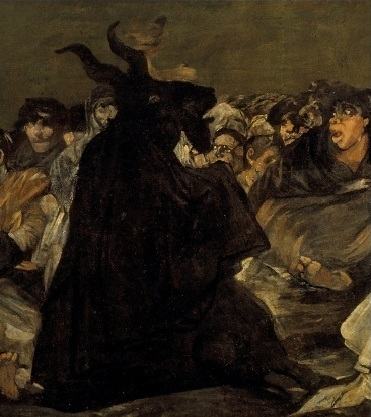
Detail from Witches' Sabbath, a 19th-century painting by Francisco Goya that depicts Satan in the form of a goat

Dali's loss of status and power in the Christian era was reflected in altered folk practices. Prayers and sacrifices once offered to Dali were instead offered to Saint George. In the village of Tskheta in historic Lechkhumi province, hunters who encountered "the forest woman" could dismiss her simply by speaking George's name, confirming his power over her.

Virsaladze writes that as Saint George began to eclipse Dali, she became increasingly associated with evil spirits and demonic imagery. Her character became entwined with a kind of evil spirit called the ali. The ali retained Dali's connection with hunters and high crags, but her supernatural beauty, particularly her radiant hair, was inverted into horrifying ugliness. A spell to protect travelers from the ali described her as having misplaced features, backwards limbs, a terrible visage, and "ghastly hair, soiled with blood". Her malicious aspects were emphasized and her patronage and protection of hunters were downplayed. Dali's favored animals, such as the wild goats and chamois she often transformed into, were used in Christian imagery to depict Satan, an evil entity who opposes God. This degraded version of Dali is sometimes depicted in the company of devils.

Virsaladze and Hunt have both suggested these changes to the Dali myth are a direct consequence of the Christian church altering existing pagan beliefs to associate them with evil in an effort to discredit them. According to Virsaladze, this was not entirely successful, and belief in Dali persisted alongside Christianity, particularly in remote mountainous regions where the Christian church had less influence. One elderly man she interviewed during her research in the mid twentieth-century described Dali as both a deity and as a tormenting spirit, indicating that both versions of the myth were still extant in the modern era.

== Mythological parallels ==
More than one author has discussed significant parallels between Dali and other mythological figures from other cultures with similar roles and associations. Equivalent figures to Dali appear in the mythologies of many Caucasian groups. Scholarly comparisons to various figures from Greek mythology are also prevalent, and some have argued that these similarities are a result of sustained contact between the peoples of ancient Greece and ancient Georgia. Other work has compared Dali to Near Eastern goddesses, as she shares similar motifs including dawn associations and mortal lovers. Finally, it has also been suggested that Dali represents a preserved version of a particular Western European mythological archetype of a mistress of hunting or beasts, which has become altered or corrupted in other places.

=== Caucasian equivalents ===
Historical Svaneti region overlaid on the modern map of Georgia

Dali was important to the Svan, to the point of being their most widely-known mythological figure. Other Caucasian peoples had myths that described significantly similar deities who may be considered roughly equivalent with Dali, with regional variations. The Mingrelian people of the historical Samegrelo region, to the south of Svaneti, revered a golden-haired goddess of the hunt called Tkashi-Mapa, who scholars view as an equivalent of Dali due to the overlap in their mythological roles and associations. Both lived in the wilderness, shape-shifted into animals, took mortal lovers, and were dangerously jealous. Tuite, drawing on Chikovani's work in 1972, has proposed that the golden-haired goddess Samdzimari ("necklace-wearer") from northeastern Georgia served a similar, even equivalent role to Dali, though she was not explicitly a hunting deity. Samdzimari and Dali were both seductive figures associated with domestic functions who moved in inaccessible or non-civilized spaces. Each serves as the female counterpart of their respective regional version of Saint George.

Caucasian cultures who worshipped a male hunting deity often had stories about a figure who served Dali's function as the "mistress of the beasts", but was not considered a deity. In many places this figure is known only as the "forest woman" or a similar descriptive title. Virsaladze regarded this figure as essentially the same as Dali. The Khevsurians, who worshipped the male Ochopintre, retained the concept of a tiny protectress of the cliffs. The Ossetians, whose primary hunting deity was Æfsati, had a forest woman. The northern Caucasian Kumyks and the inhabitants of the Lechkhumi and Guria regions each had a forest woman rather than a strong tradition of a hunting goddess. The Avar people of the northern Caucasus have stories about a "Forest Beauty" with golden hair like Dali. The recurring concept of a "forest woman" (or less frequently a "forest man") has been proposed as possible evidence of a common pan-Caucasian mythology that might have existed before Christianity and Islam came to the Caucasus.

The "forest woman" is a recurring motif in the Nart saga, a loose collection of stories from the northern Caucasus which underpins much of the mythology of the area. The Digor, an Ossetian subgroup, have a story from about a deer-herding witch who bears some similarities to Dali. Like Dali, she favors a white doe and uses her hair to bind hunters who offend her, although unlike most Dali stories, the hunters overcome the witch in the end. Other Nart saga stories involve goddesses or magical women who, like Dali, transform into deer, have glowing skin, and take hunters as lovers. Tuite has also noted that Dzerassae, a water spirit of the Nart saga, had similarities to Dali: she had golden hair and could change her shape into a fish or a deer. He cited linguist John Colarusso, who suggested there might be a link between their names based on the initial syllable, with the shift in phoneme caused by translation into Circassian.

=== Greek mythology ===
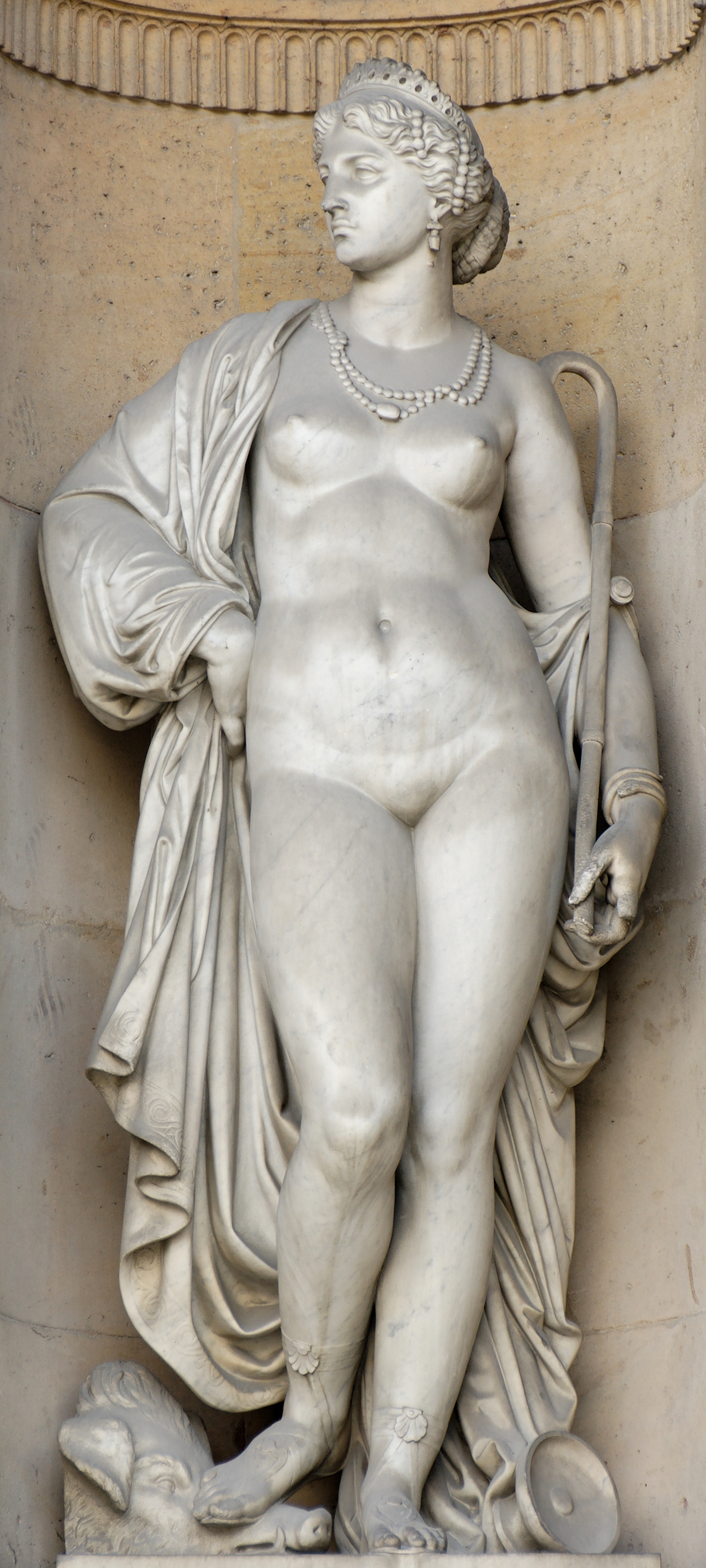
Circe (1860), by Charles Gumery

Tuite compared Dali in her role as the mother of Amirani to the Greek Nereid Thetis, mother of Achilles. Each goddess took a mortal for a lover and bore a demi-god son. Their sons were destined to be warriors of enormous power, possibly enough to challenge the creator deity of their respective mythologies. Although extremely formidable, neither attains his full potential, and both are eventually defeated. Tuite posits that the similarity between the two myths is indicative of prehistoric contact between the ancient Greek and Caucasian peoples.

Classical scholar Egbert Bakker discussed Dali as a parallel to the Greek witch-goddess Circe of Homer's Odyssey, highlighting their shared aspects: "protection of animals, sexual predation, dawn and New Year associations", and a "male divine counterpart and adversary". He went on to suggest that their similarities indicated a cultural exchange between the Georgians and the Greeks, noting that the Svan homeland is close to the ancient Georgian kingdom of Colchis, a region with close trading connections to Greece.

Some sources have noted a similarity to the Greek goddess Artemis, who was also a patron of wild animals and hunting, although unlike Dali she was known for prudishness rather than promiscuity. Both were associated with transitions and boundaries, especially between civilization and the wilderness.

=== Near Eastern goddesses ===
Writing in the 1940s, the Georgian author Demna Shengelaya examined Dali as an equivalent of the Babylonian goddess Ishtar, identifying themes of matriarchy struggling against patriarchal values reflected in the stories of each.

Virsaladze found similarities between Dali and several related Near Eastern deities including Ishtar, the Phrygian goddess Cybele, Phoenician Astarte, and Carthaginian Tanit, noting that all these goddesses were associated with a mortal lover in a story cycle representing the transition to spring and the cyclical rebirth of nature. She particularly stressed the similarities between Dali and Ishtar: sovereignty over animals, an association with dawn, and a sexual aggressiveness that was feared by men. She suggested the possibility that the mythology surrounding Dali represented a preserved form of "a very ancient cycle of traditions and songs about the interrelations of the mistress, patroness, or sovereign, of the beasts, forest, crags and waters, with a mortal young man". According to Virsaladze, this mythological motif is a fragment of a matriarchal belief system which venerated nature and life-giving mother deities, later supplanted by patriarchal ideology.

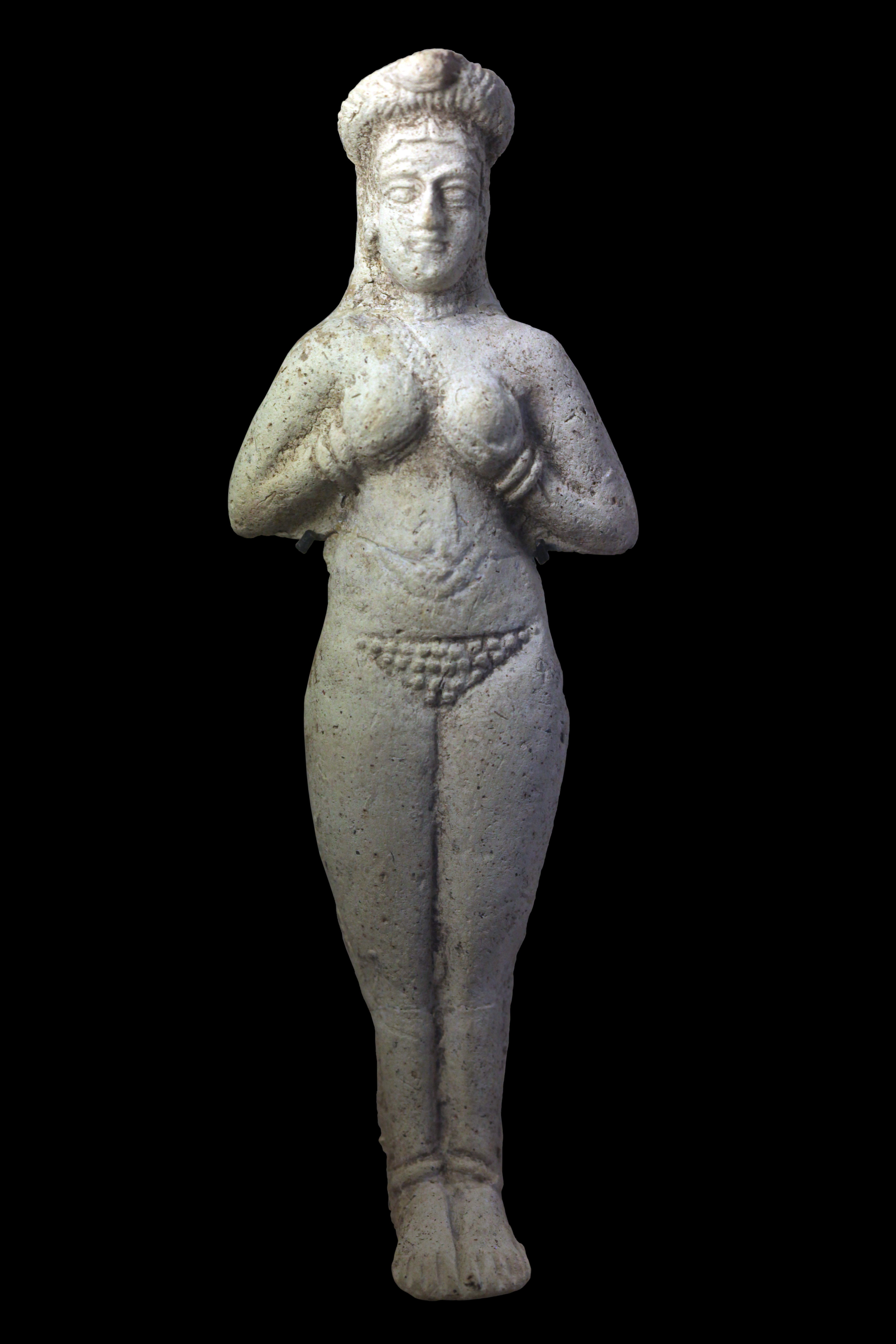
Statuette possibly representing Ishtar (c. 1300 – c. – c. 1100 BC)

Drawing on the work of earlier writers such as Walter Burkert and Paul Friedrich, Tuite described mythological similarities between Dali and several other similar goddesses who have parallel motifs possibly indicating mutual influence. Foremost among these similarities are an association with gold (both as a color and as a precious metal), fertility and patronage of animals, seductive behavior combined with destructive jealousy, and a connection to dawn or the morning star. He refers to these similarities as the "dawn goddess complex". Goddesses with some or all of these features include the Proto-Indo-European dawn goddess Hausōs, and two Greek deities likely descended from her, the dawn goddess Eos and the love goddess Aphrodite. He also highlights the Sumerian goddess Inanna, and her Babylonian counterpart Ishtar as sharing these parallel motifs, despite not being derived from Hausōs. Tuite identifies the overarching themes of the dawn goddess complex as ambiguity and transition. He notes that the mythological associations of these goddesses serve as symbols for larger concepts such as transitions between night to day, old to new, and birth to death. In Dali's case, her identification with both the morning star and New Year's Eve directly reinforce her status as a patron of transitions.

Archaeologist Elena Rova, drawing on Tuite's work, wrote that there appears to be evidence of the transmission of symbols and beliefs between the Mesopotamian and Georgian peoples during the Bronze Age. She described the 2014 discovery of a fragment of a decorated sandstone plaque in the Aradetis Orgora mounds on the Dedoplis Mindori archaeological site in Georgia as the basis for this speculation. The plaque, attributed to the 14th–13th centuries BCE, features a nine-pointed star similar to the eight-pointed star of Ishtar. Rova believed the star design may have been passed from Mesopotamia to Georgia through long-distance trade of the item itself or indirect memetic transmission of the design. It may then have been appropriated for use as a symbol of a local solar goddess such as Dali, possibly because some of Ishtar's features were similar enough to Dali "for the symbol of the latter to have been consciously chosen by the local population in order to symbolise a local goddess".

=== Western European figures ===
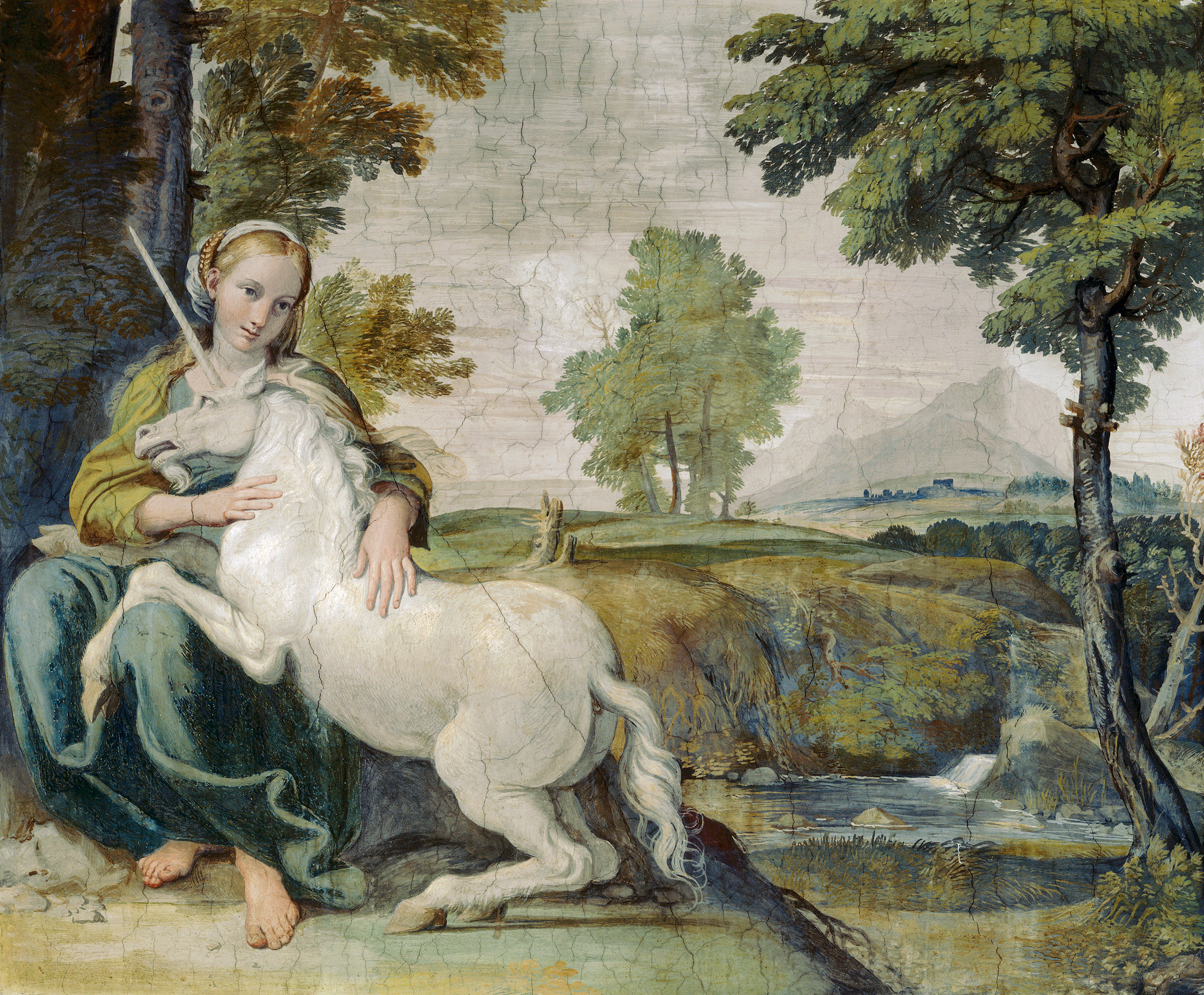
The gentle and pensive maiden has the power to tame the unicorn. Fresco, probably by Domenico Zampieri c. 1604–05, (Palazzo Farnese, Rome)

David Hunt compared the hunting mythology surrounding Dali to the western European concept of the unicorn and the lady who tames it. He noted that stories of the unicorn typically focus on hunting, often in high mountains. Traditional descriptions of the unicorn include features which are characteristic of goats and deer, such as cloven hooves. In turn, hoofed animals are important prey for the hunters of the Caucasian mountains and feature heavily in their mythology. Dali's favored animals were marked in ways that make them similar to the unicorn; in particular, they were often pure white or single-horned. Finally, he found a parallel between the motif of a lady taming the unicorn and the recurring idea of a goddess or supernatural mistress who protects wild game animals. Although he admitted the evidence was "circumstantial and sparse", he suggested that the unicorn story originated from ancient European hunting mythology, which he believes was preserved in the mythology of the Caucasus after fading elsewhere.

Hilda Ellis Davidson and Anna Chaudhri found similarities between stories of Dali and the glaistig of the Scottish Highlands. The glaistig was commonly described as a hag who lived high in the mountains and protected hoofed game animals. Like Dali, the glaistig could be both helpful and malicious, depending on the story in question. Although protective of her animals, in some stories the glaistig would allow them to be hunted, as long as the hunters were respectful and left appropriate offerings to her. In other stories, the glaistig would pose as an old woman and prey on hunters staying in mountain huts called bothies. Both Dali and the glaistig use their supernaturally-strong hair as bindings; Dali binds hunters directly, while the glaistig binds hunting dogs so she can safely attack their masters.

Davidson and Chaudhri concluded that Dali and the glaistig each represent a local version of an archetypal figure of a female guardian of the wilderness, which they suggested is a widespread mythological theme. Dali represents a preserved form of the myth, where the goddess retains her power and her beauty. In contrast, the glaistig represents an altered form, where the goddess has been reduced to an ugly hag and is accorded significantly less respect. They argue that similar figures who ranging from seductive to disturbing were once widespread across various European places and cultures, referencing the forest women of Scandinavia, Greek Artemis, and the Irish Cailleach. The later forms where the guardian figure is ugly or wicked represent a version that became prominent after respect for the earlier goddess figures had withered.

== Modern legacy ==
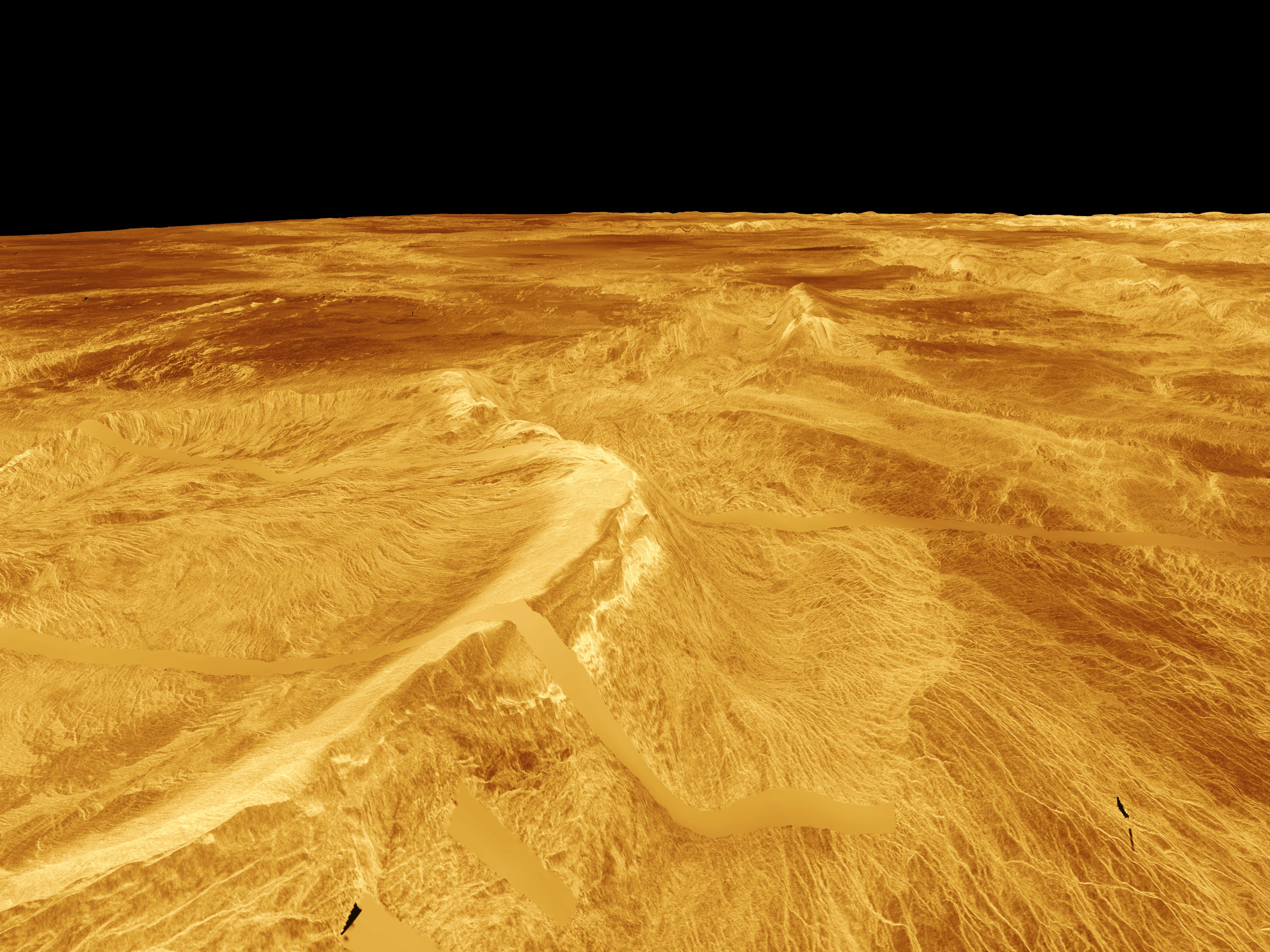
Perspective view of Dali Chasma and Latona Corona on Venus

Dali has retained cultural significance among Georgians into the modern day, particularly in more rural areas where hunting is still practiced as a profession. A survey conducted in 2013 found that, while most people who were either younger or more educated considered Dali to be mythological, many elderly hunters still thought of Dali as a real figure, although not one that any of them had personally encountered. They recounted stories to the researchers of hunters they knew who had encountered Dali and been injured or driven mad as a result.

In the modern era, eponyms and literary allusions to Dali indicate the persistence of her narrative in the cultural memory. The Dali Chasma and the Tkashi-mapa Chasma on Venus are named for Dali and her Mingrelian equivalent Tkashi-Mapa. Capra dalii, a fossil species of goat discovered in Georgia, is named for Dali. Fragments of Capra dalii fossils were first located at the Dmanisi archaeological site in 2006, and are believed to be related to the west Caucasian tur, Capra caucasica.

Celebrated Georgian novelist Konstantine Gamsakhurdia wove numerous figures from Georgian folklore, including Dali, into his 1936 novel Stealing the Moon. Georgian author Grigol Robakidze integrated Dali into the German-language works he wrote in exile, particularly the novels Megi – Ein georgisches Mädchen (Megi – A Georgian Girl, 1932), where Dali forms the basis of the character Ivlite, and Der Ruf der Göttin (The Call of the Goddess, 1934), based on the stories of hunters falling from cliffs because of Dali. Two poems composed after the accidental death of the famed Svan mountain climber Mikhail Khergiani in 1969 refer to Dali mourning his loss.

In 2019, the town of Lentekhi removed a figure of Dali from the design of a large fountain planned for the city's main square. The original proposal featured a statue of Dali, nude, standing atop a large rock, with three ibexes standing on the rock beneath her. Metropolitan Stephan of the Georgian Orthodox eparchy of Tsageri and Lentekhi strongly criticized the inclusion of the goddess as idolatry, although mayor Badri Liparteliani stated the change was intended to increase the fountain's efficiency and visual appeal. The final version was built without the statue of Dali, and simply features three ibexes sitting atop a rock.

The top prize of the Svaneti International Film Festival, founded in 2021, is the "Goddess Dali Prize".

== See also ==
- Britomartis – Greek goddess of mountains and hunting
- Bugady Musun – Siberian animal guardian who took the form of a reindeer
- Deer Woman – seductive forest spirit whose form was partially a deer
- Devana – Slavic goddess of forests and the hunt
- Mielikki – Finnish hunting goddess who herded cows and could determine the success of a hunt
- Potnia Theron – widespread motif found in ancient art depicting a female holding two animals
- Skaði – Norse mountain goddess associated with hunting, skiing, and winter
