= Ochokochi =

Georgian mythological Character

Ochokochi (Mingrelian: ოჩოკოჩი, literally goat-man) is a figure from Georgian mythology, particularly the Colchian and Mingrelian ethnic groups. Instead of hair on his breast, he has a protuberance in the form of a pointed bone or a stone-axe. He attacks passers by, whom he kills by embracing them.

He is infatuated by the beauty of the Queen of the Forest, Tkashi-Mapa, after whom he chases. However, his attempts to catch her are often thwarted by the hunters who visit her forest.
