= Amirani =

Georgian mythical figure

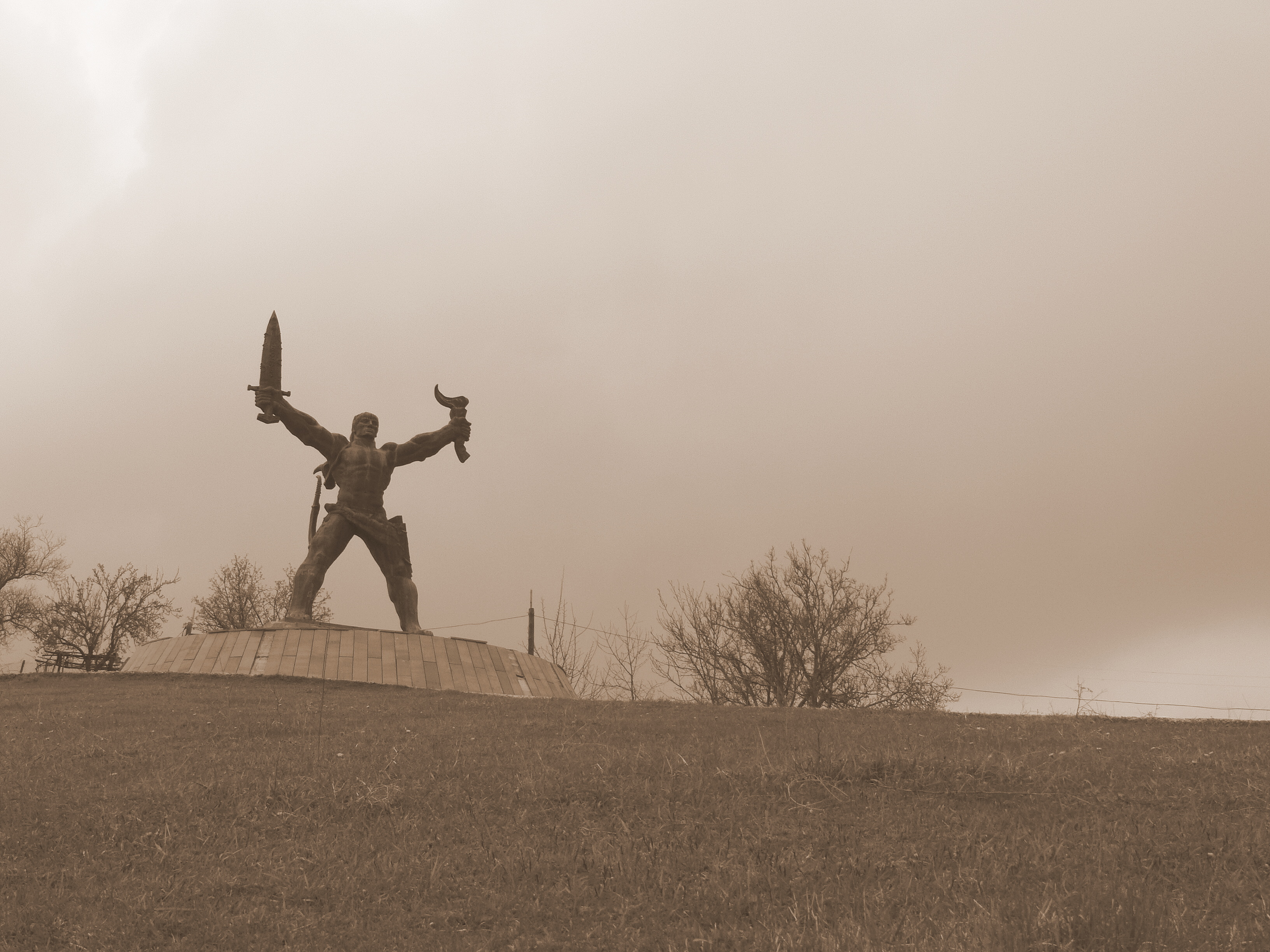
Monument to Amirani in Georgia.

Amirani or Amiran (Georgian: ამირანი) is the name of a culture hero of a Georgian epic who resembles the Classical Prometheus. Various versions of the myth reveal a process through which the myth was transformed over time, but the legend itself is traced between 3,000 and 2,000 years BC at the beginning of the first Iron Age. In the myth a Demiurge figure - Amirani - defies God by introducing the use of metal to humanity. Like Prometheus, he is punished and chained in the Caucasus Mountains with his cursed dog Q'ursha. Similar to the Prometheus myth, an eagle eats his liver in the day, but it heals itself every night.

== History ==
Amirani was the son of Dali, a Caucasian goddess of the hunt, but he was removed prematurely from her womb and raised by a hunter Sulkalmakhi and his wife Darejan, alongside the latter's two natural sons Badri and Usup. Amirani was raised violently in the wilderness. Alongside his brothers, he would attack every stranger they encountered, driven only by the desire to test their strength.

Eager for adventure, he fought against Devs—demonic giants who lived on the fringes of inhabited lands. Later, to avenge the murder of their uncle, the three brothers set out in search of his killer: a three-headed giant named Baq’-Baq’.

Amirani challenged the giant to a duel and severed all three of its heads. From each head emerged a worm, and each worm transformed into a dragon—one white, one red, and one black. Amirani killed the white and red dragons, but the black dragon swallowed him whole and took refuge either in the Black Sea or the underworld. From inside the dragon, Amirani cut its belly open and killed it.

He then journeyed across the seas in search of kamar, the daughter of the demon king Kaji. The demon army pursued him and killed his adopted brothers, but Amirani succeeded in slaying every one of his enemies, including their king.

Victorious but devastated by the loss of his brothers, Amirani took his own life. However, kamar used her magical powers to bring him—and his companions—back to life.

Amirani began to wander alone and encountered a giant undead man, so heavy that even Amirani couldn't lift one of his legs. Amirani prayed to Ghmerti (the Georgian word for God), asking Him to grant him strength. God granted Amirani supernatural power. Swollen with pride and might, Amirani grew arrogant and challenged God Himself to a duel. To punish his hubris, God subjected him to a threefold torment:

- He chained him to a stake driven deep into the earth.
- A woman buried him beneath a dome-shaped mountain rock, with chains binding his body. A winged dog named Q'ursha licked the chains until they began to weaken—but whenever they were about to break, blacksmiths beyond the Caucasus struck their anvils, and the chains regained their strength.
- Once a year, the mountain prison opened, and Amirani was allowed to return to the open sky for a single night. A compassionate man tried to free him, but due to the loud voice of a woman, the mountain closed once again.

Amirani gave its name to the extraterrestrial volcano Amirani.

== See also ==
- Georgian mythology
- Amiran-Darejaniani
