= Georgian mythology =

Georgian mythology (Georgian: ქართული მითოლოგია, romanized: kartuli mitologia) refers to the mythology of pre-Christian Georgians (/kʌrtˈvɛliənz/; Georgian: ქართველები, romanized: kartvelebi, pronounced [ˈkʰaɾtʰvelebi]), an indigenous Caucasian ethnic group native to Georgia and the South Caucasus. The mythology of the Kartvelian peoples is believed by many scholars to have formed part of the religions of the kingdoms of Diauehi, Colchis and Iberia.

Later influences include the mythologies of the Ancient Greeks, the Vainakh peoples and Iranians – the last-named comprising both the belief systems of the Northern Iranian nomad Scythians and Sarmatians (still preserved to some extent in the mythology of their descendants the Ossetians) and that of the Zoroastrian religion of the Ancient Persian empire, which has left an enduring legacy among the nations of the Caucasus. (See also Iranian religions)

Georgian myths and legends are preserved mainly as popular tales, many of them eventually fusing with Christian legends after the Christianization of Georgia seventeen centuries ago. The evangelizing of Georgia, however, was far from uniform. While the lowland populations embraced Christianity in the fifth century, the highlanders of the mountain valleys in the Greater Caucasus range were converted some ten centuries later – and only superficially. Survivals of pagan beliefs and practices in the Georgian plains are thus, understandably, heavily influenced by Christianity, lacking in mythological unity and essentially folkloric.

The mountain Georgians, on the other hand, preserved a rich and well-organized [pagan] religious system to the beginning of the twentieth century, with differentiated cults that continued to be productive [thanks largely to the persistence of] a priestly class with an orally-transmitted body of knowledge.

— Georges Charachidzé

== Khevsur/Pshav creation myth (northeastern Georgia) ==
In the beginning, there existed only the head god (მორიგე ღმერთი) and his Sister. She made him unhappy, so he cursed her. The sister became a demon. For every good thing that the head god created, the Demon created an evil thing to mar it and oppose it. Women too was a creation of the Demon, as were the lesser demons (Georgian: დევი, romanized: devi – see below), while men and the lesser gods were creations of Morige Ghmerti. The lesser gods grew weary in their unceasing fight with the demons and fled to the upper world of Zeskneli (ზესკნელი), leaving behind the men. The men however lacked the power to resist the demons, so the lesser gods (Georgian: ღვთის შვილნი, romanized: ghvtis shvilni – see below) hunted down the demons and drove them underground to the netherworld of Kveskneli (ქვესკნელი). The demons left behind them the women who, like them, were part of the evil creation.

Men and women are thus only emanations of, or substitutes for, the gods above and the demons below, respectively. The same principle holds true for all created things: the entities and substances of the universe are divided into two antagonistic series, one wild and demonic, the other social and divine. The only entities or substances that are truly real are those of the upper world of Zeskneli and the lower world of Kveskneli. The middle world inhabited by humans is thus only a place of passage and meeting, and the beings who people it have no essence in themselves, being only emanations of the divine or subterranean worlds, or else their unions.

== Cosmology ==
In pre-Christian Georgian mythology, the universe is perceived as a sphere. It comprises three worlds or levels, known as skneli (სკნელი):

- Zeskneli (ზესკნელი) – the highest world, and the home of the gods. White is the color of Zeskneli.
- The Earth – the middle world, home of mortals. Its center is divided into two regions, anterior (tsina samkaro, წინა სამყარო; or tsinaskneli, წინასკნელი) and posterior (ukana samkaro, უკანა სამყარო; or ukana skneli, უკანასკნელი); – beyond which the lands of Earth are divided by seven or nine mountains (or seas), which a hero can traverse only by first undergoing a spiritual transformation (known as gardatsvaleba (გარდაცვალება) – which is also the word for "death") and seeking the help of magical animals, such as the Paskunji, the Rashi and others. Red is the colour of this world.
- Kveskneli (ქვესკნელი) – the lowest world or underworld, inhabited by the ogres, serpents, and demons. Black is the colour of Kveskneli.

== Practices of shamanic type ==
The mountain Georgian equivalent of the shaman is the Kadagi, a person (of either gender) who has become permanently possessed by one of the class of minor (i.e. local / specialised) divinities known most often by the name of Hat'i (= 'sign' ), but also by those of Dzhuar (= 'cross') and Saghmto (= 'divinity'). The Hat'i numbered several hundred at the turn of the nineteenth century and the word Hat'i could designate not only a divinity of this class but also its manifestation (as image, object, or real or imaginary animal and the place (temple / sanctuary) where it was worshipped. The Kadag would go into a trance, both at religious rituals and at events important in individual or collective life, and his or her indwelling Hat'i would foretell the future in a special secret or sacred 'language of the Hat'i ' (see also Spirit possession).

A second type of practitioner of shamanic type (exclusively female) was the Mesultane – the word deriving from Georgian suli 'soul'. A Mesultane – usually a woman, although sometimes as young as a girl of nine – was a female who possessed 'the faculty of visiting the beyond in spirit'. At certain times these females would plunge into 'a lethargy broken by mutterings', following which they would awaken and describe their 'journey', communicating the requests of the dead to particular individuals or to the community at large. From their ability to enter these trance states they would derive honours and prestige.

== List of supernatural beings from Georgian myth ==
=== Pantheon ===
- Bochi (ბოჩი) - the Horned God of fertility and cattle breeding. The first written account of this deity comes from Euthymius of Athos. Bochi was typically depicted in the form of a goat, and his name literally translates as "male goat". According to Prince Teimuraz, Bochi was worshipped both in Colchis and in Iberia. He states that Bochi’s main temple was located in Colchis, on the site of what is now the Pitsunda Cathedral. After Christianity became the dominant religion, the temple was destroyed, and a church was built on its ruins.
- Adgilis Deda (ადგილის დედა) – A goddess of fertility and livestock revered by the inhabitants of the mountainous areas of northeastern Georgia (such as Khevsureti) as the patroness of certain places and of travellers. She is portrayed as a beautiful lady with silver jewellery. She later became associated with the Virgin Mary when the area was converted to Christianity. Her name means "Mother of Locality".
- Ainina and Danina (აინინა და დანინა) – A pair of goddesses who are mentioned in The Conversion of Kartli and the mediaeval Georgian Chronicles.
- Elia (ელია) – The god of rain and thunder in Georgian mythology. His original name from the pre-Christian, pagan period is unknown. After the Christianization of Georgia, the pagan deity became identified with the biblical prophet Elijah. Despite efforts by the official Church, Christianity was unable to eradicate the cult of Elia, merely incorporating certain Christian elements into it.
- Apsat (აფსათი) – A male god of birds and animals in Svan mythology.
- Shavkhan (შავხანი) – God of blacksmithing in Svan mythology.
- Bedis Mtserlebi (ბედის მწერლები) – Deities who write the fate of humans and all other spiritual beings with the help of their magic book.
- Armazi (არმაზი) – Chief of the gods; central figure in the official religion of (Caucasian) Iberia (= Kartli) established by King Pharnavaz I of Iberia (4th century BC). According to the Life of Saint Nino an immense statue of Armazi – along with images of other deities and the temple that housed them – was destroyed by a storm of giant hailstones raised by the prayers of Saint Nino. Armazi is also the name of an ancient fortress near Mtskheta that dates from the same period. Various complementary strands of research suggest that the origins of this deity lie in a syncretism between conceptions of the Zoroastrian supreme being Ahura Mazda (Armenian: 'Aramazd') and a native Georgian supreme lunar deity (see also Tetri Giorgi below) – a regional variant of the Hittite moon god Arma.
- Barbale (ბარბალე) – The goddess of cattle and poultry fertility, the sun, women's fertility, and healing.
- Batonebi (ბატონები) – Spirits of disease. Their name means "the masters". In modern use "Batonebi" is used as a term to refer to a small set of infectious diseases, that are often prominent among children (measles, chickenpox and few others) If anyone is infected by the Batonebi, following one tradition their family will prepare special food and candies, and place presents under trees to appease the Batonebi (Traditions vary, but general motif is for whole family to appease the sick child).
- Beri Bera (ბერი ბერა) – An agricultural god of fertility, harvests, and animals who is worshipped in eastern Georgia. His festival is held at the end of the year.
- Dali (დალი), Svanetian 'Dæl' – the goddess of the hunt. She was believed to have extraordinary beauty, with long golden hair and radiant white skin. She dwells high up in the mountains, in a shining golden cave where she watches over and protects wild animals. She sometimes shares animals with hunters, as long as they respect her rules by not hunting more than their needed amounts or taking aim at animals that are her manifestations. In some myths, she will enter into a sexual relationship with a hunter, while warning him not to reveal their liaison upon pain of death by causing him to fall to his death from a cliff, usually during a hunt – the fate also of those who break promises they have made her. She is the mother of the hero Amiran.
- Gatsi and Gaim (გაცი და გაიმი) – Gods in the official Iberian pantheon according to the medieval annals.
- Ghmerti (ღმერთი) – The supreme divinity and the head of the pantheon of gods. He is the all-powerful Lord of the Universe and its Creator. He lives in the ninth sky, where he rules from a golden throne. His children include the moon (as his son), the sun (as his daughter), and the Ghvtis Shvilni who protect people against evil. He is also addressed as Morige Ghmerti (მორიგე ღმერთი, "God the Director") and Dambadebeli (დამბადებელი, "The Creator"). His name is later used to refer to God the Father in Christian belief.
- Kamar (ყამარი) The daughter of the god of the sky. She is a symbol of divine fire. Her beautiful appearance caused Amiran to abduct her from heaven.
- Lamaria, also Lamara (ლამარია) – goddess of fertility, cattle, and the hearth
- Mamber (მამბერი) – The lord of wolves ( compare Ossetian Tutyr – see below under heading 'Tevdore' ), who was worshiped in Svaneti and other mountainous regions.
- Michpa (მიჭპა) – The patron god of cattle and other domestic animals who was worshiped in Svaneti during winter.
- Mindort Batoni (მინდორთ ბატონი) – The god of valleys, fields, and wild flowers. Humans have to ask his permission before exploring or attempting to cultivate the fruitful lands that make up his domain. His daughter, Mindort Brdzanebeli, is the beautiful goddess of flowers.
- Mindort Brdzanebeli (მინდორთ ბრძანებელი) – The goddess of flowers. She is the daughter of the god Mindort Batoni. She flutters over plants, feeding on their pollen.
- Ochopintre (ოჩოპინტრე) – A spirit of the forest and protector of wild animals. The first part of his name (ocho, ოჭო) is connected to the ancient pagan god Bochi, the second part (pintre, პინტრე) to the Greek god Pan. Born with the legs and horns of a goat, he assists the goddess Dali in herding the animals. Hunters usually made sacrifice in his name since no one could hunt the animals without his help. The fate of a person entering his forest was believed to be fully in his hands.
- Samdzimari (სამძიმარი) – demon-born goddess of fertility and oracles, seducer of men.
- Tamar (თამარი) – Goddess who enslaved the Morning Star and controlled the weather patterns; was called "eye of the earth" and rode a serpent.
- Tetri Giorgi (თეთრი გიორგი, "White George"), form of Saint George venerated in Kakheti, variously identified as a reflex of the ancient lunar god, and as a reflex of the ancient storm/weather god (Kopala).
- Tevdore (თევდორე) – God of agriculture and horses. After Christianization, he became associated with St. Theodore. In feudal times the special festival of Tedoroba was organised to honor him and ensure a bountiful harvest.
- Tskarishdida (წყარიშდიდა) – A mermaid-like goddess of rivers, lakes and fish, in Mingrelian folklore. She uses magic powers against humans.
- Zaden (ზადენი) – God of fertility in the official pantheon established by Pharnavaz I. He was believed to be as powerful as Armazi. He was added into the official pantheon by Parnajom in the second century BC, and had a statue of him erected at a fortress near Mt. Zedazeni, near Mtskheta. His statue was said to have been destroyed with the statues of other gods through the prayers of St. Nino. The worship of him declined after Christianization.

=== Demigods, heroes, and notable people ===
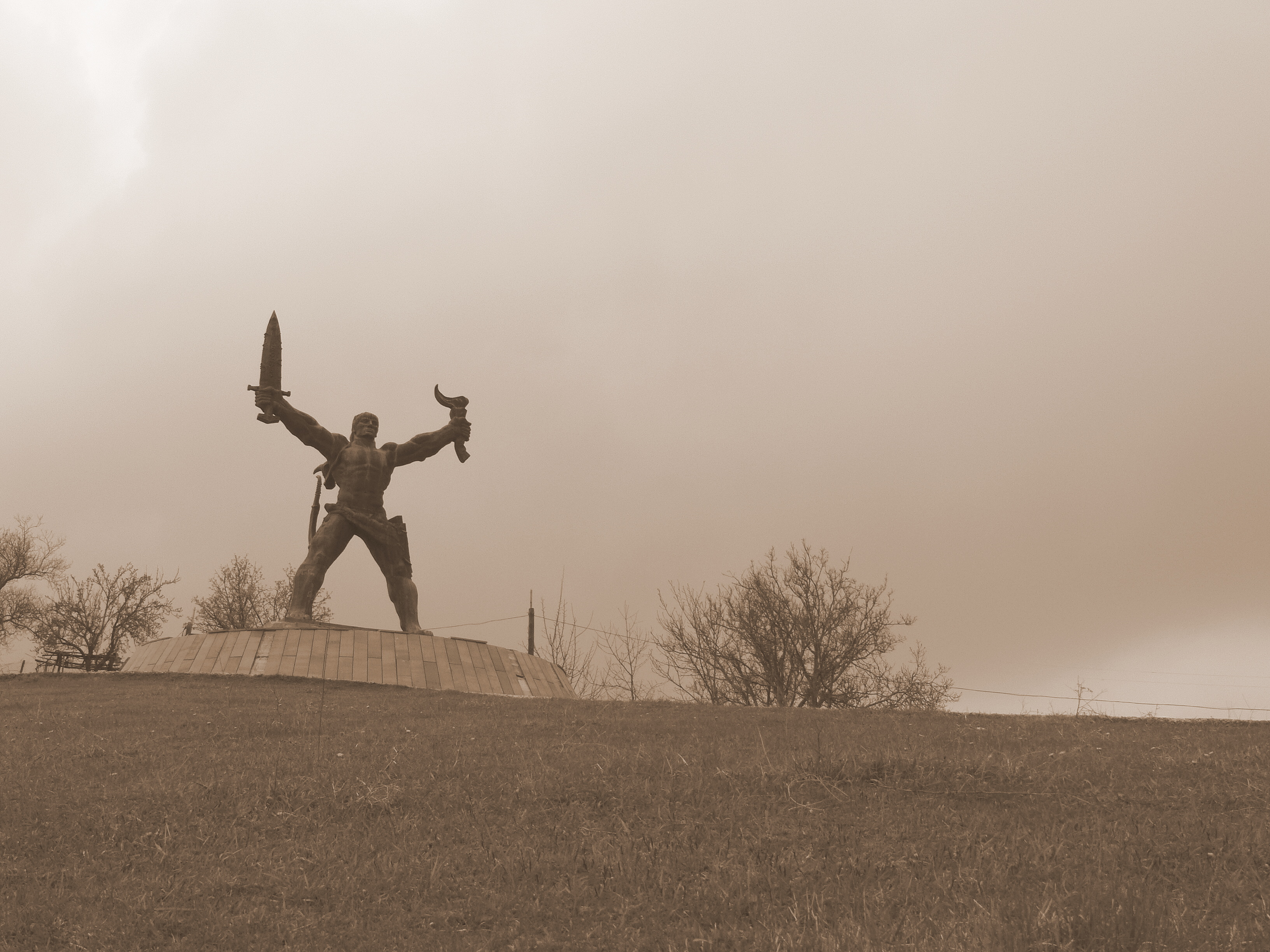
Monument to Amirani in Georgia.

- Amiran (ამირანი) – Mythic hero and titan, son of Dali. Equivalent of the Greek Prometheus.
- Iakhsar (იახსარი) – A mythic hero who aided Kopala in his adventures to slay demons and monsters, and was deified and venerated as a popular deity.
- Ghvtis Shvilni (ღვთის შვილნი, Children of God or Children of Gmerti) – A group of demigods who protected humans, assured good crops and milk yields, fought against devis and kudiani witches. Amiran, Giorgi, Iakhsar, and Kopala were among them, and they fought alongside Iakhsar and Kopala to drive out the devis from the land, and to help Giorgi to raid the impregnable fortress of the kajis to plunder their treasures, cattle, and women.
- Kopala (კოპალა) – A mythic hero, mighty warrior, and demon-killer – also a lightning god. He and Iakhsar lead a campaign to drive underground the devis who are persecuting humans in the middle realm. His weapons include a mace and an iron bow made for him by the blacksmith god Pirkusha (პირქუშა) (with whom compare Ossetian divine smith Kurdalægon and Circassian Tlepsh). He alone has the power to defeat the most stubborn demons, believed to seize a person's soul and cause madness, and, by this means, he cures those afflicted by insanity.
- Kviria (კვირია) – A hero and a son of the gods who served as a mediator between Ghmerti and humanity. He is invoked as the protector of human society and an instrument of divine justice. In some regions of Georgia, he was also believed to be a deity of fertility and the harvest, while in the mountains of western Georgia he was worshiped as the supreme deity. The festival of Kviratskholovba (კვირაცხოვლობა) was celebrated to honour him, as also (Marshall Lang surmises) were the erotic and orgiastic cults and festivals, such as the Berikoba and Murqvamoba, celebrated regularly until recent times among the Pshavs, Khevsurs, Svans and other mountain Georgian tribes. The curious ithyphallic figurines discovered by G.D. Filimonov at the settlement of Kazbek on the Georgian Military Highway may also (Marshall Lang further surmises) relate to erotic aspects of the cult of Kviria. Such figurines have been the subject of much debate among archaeologists and anthropologists and examples continue to come to light in various parts of Georgia, as far east as central Kakhetia, in association with finds of bronze daggers of specific 'Kakhetian type', dating to between the thirteenth and eighth centuries B.C. Some of these ithyphallic figurines had been designed to be hung from the khantsi drinking horns.
- Natsiliani (ნაწილიანი) – Humans who received magic gifts or divine signs (Georgian: ნაწილი, romanized: nats'ili) from the gods. Their signs are usually located on their shoulder-blades and glow with magic light, empowering their bearers. These signs must be kept hidden, as their bearers will lose their powers if they reveal them.

=== Spirits, creatures, and other beings ===
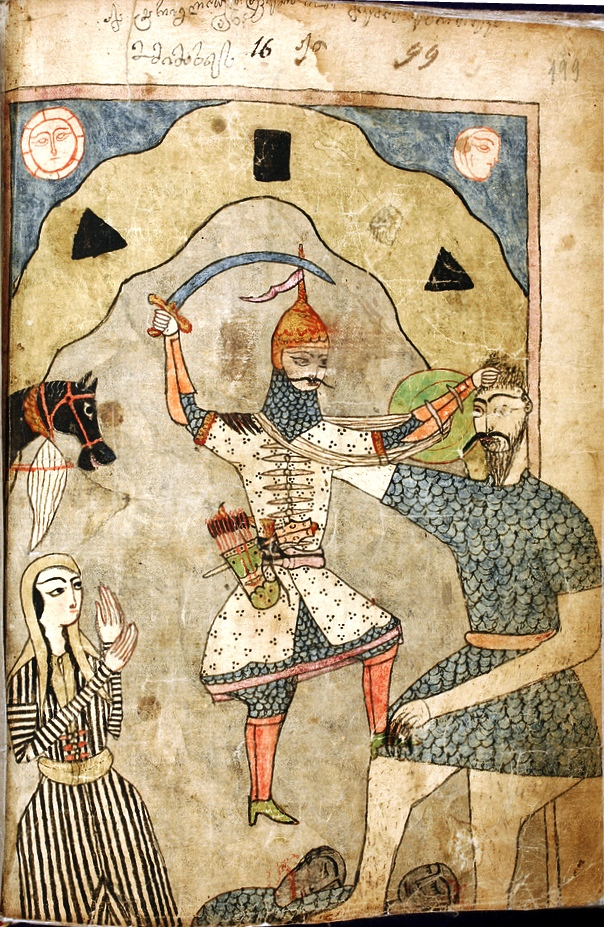
"Tariel's Battle with the Devi" A miniature by Mamuka Tavakalashvili from the manuscript of Shota Rustaveli's "Knight in the Panther's Skin". H599. 199r. National Center of Manuscripts, Tbilisi, Georgia

- Ali (ალი) – A type of Lilith-like demon that afflicts pregnant women, the elderly, and infants who happen to stumble into remote woods, caves, and ruins. Alis can be male or female (the females being known as alkali); male alis generally appear monstrous, while female alis can shift between tempting beauty and hag-like ugliness. Their name may be related to the word for "flame" (ალი). This supernatural being occurs not only in the folklore of the Caucasus, but also in the folk beliefs of Iran, Central Asia and Mongolia and conceptions of its appearance may derive from folk memories of relict hominins (see also Almas (cryptozoology)).
- Devi (დევი) – Many-headed ogres whose heads can regenerate if any of them are cut off (compare Lernaean Hydra). These malevolent giants live in the underworld or in remote mountains, where they hoard treasure troves and keep their captives. In Georgian mythology, they live in a family, consisting usually of nine brothers. Bakbak-Devi (ბაყბაყ-დევი) was the strongest and the most powerful of the devis. To defeat them, heroes would outwit them by means of various tricks and games. Their name (a borrowing into the Kartvelian (language family) Georgian language from Indo-European) is related to that of the daevas of Zoroastrian and Persian mythology, derived in turn from Proto-Indo-European *deiu̯ó 'god'.
- Dobilni (translation: 'the ones who became sisters'; დობილნი) – disease-spreading spirits, appearing usually in the form of women, children or animals. Dobilni towers (Georgian: დობილთ კოშკი, romanized: dobilt k'oshk'i) were built in Khevsurian shrines to keep them at bay. Some Dobilni are benevolent, such as Princess Samdzimar (სამძიმარი) of Khevsureti legend, who is invoked for an easy childbirth, the birth of healthy children, and women's health in general. Benevolent Dobilni were also invoked at certain shrines in order to bless cattle and also for the protection of travellers.
- Gveleshapi (გველეშაპი, in ancient sources გველ-ვეშაპი – Snake-whale) – Evil serpent that ruled and lived in lakes, rivers, and water sources (compare Nāga). In folklore, they were associated with water-related disasters, and heroes fought against them. (See also Serpent (symbolism).
- Kaji (ქაჯი) – A race of spirits who are often portrayed as magic-wielding, demonic metal-workers ( compare Sons of Ivaldi ). They lived in Kajeti (ქაჯეთი), and had magic powers that they used against humans. Land kajis were malevolent, while river and lake kajis were friendly to humans. Female kajis were beautiful, and they either seduced heroes or helped them in their quests. They appear prominently in Shota Rustaveli's Vepkhistkaosani (ვეფხისტყაოსანი), in which the Kajis abduct Princess Nestan-Darejan and fight the heroes at Kajeti fortress, although Rustaveli euhemerises them, portraying them, not as a race of supernatural beings, but a tribe of human wizards (albeit wizards of awe-inspiring power). The Kajis also feature in The Snake-eater by another celebrated Georgian poet, Vazha-Pshavela, in which they appear as the preparers of a stew of snake-meat that confers occult wisdom on the hero, Mindia (compare The White Snake). Their name is related to the Armenian storm and wind spirits, the kaj (Armenian: քաջ, k'aǰ; plural: քաջք k'aǰk').
- Kudiani (კუდიანი) – A type of hideous hunchbacked witch, having large teeth and a tail, from the latter of which her name is derived (kudi, კუდი, "tail"). Kudianis can disguise themselves as humans in order to bewitch them. The leader of the kudianis, Rokap (როკაპი), often summons them to a special mountain (compare Brocken, Łysa Góra, Lysa Hora (Kyiv) and Lysa Hora (folklore)) where they hold a festival similar to the European Walpurgis Night.
- Matsil (მაცილი) – Evil spirits from the underworld that plague travelers and hunters. Folk tales refer to Kopala's efforts to defeat them.
- Mgebri (მგებრი) - From mountain regions of east Georgia, a spirit of a dying person's passed male relative, sent from the afterlife back to the mortal world to be the first to greet their dying family member when they pass. Normally a Mgebri will be the person's close family member, most often the mother's brothers. The Mgebri appear as young lads, some on horses, some on foot. They have to lead the way into the spirit world, or the deceased person won't be able to enter it.
- Ochokochi (ოჩოკოჩი) – A forest being in Mingrelian folklore who comes into conflict with hunters. Instead of hair on his chest, he has a protuberance in the form of a pointed bone or a stone axe, which he uses to kill passersby by embracing them. He often chases Tkashmapa, the beautiful Queen of the Forest, out of lust, but his uncouth advances are just as often thwarted by mortal hunters (with the worthiest of whom she prefers, on occasion, to mate).
- Paskunji (ფასკუნჯი) – A phoenix-like being who helps heroes and humans. He lives in the underworld, and fights the serpents there. Heroes summoned him by burning one of his feathers, and he could transport them to other places and heal wounds and illnesses. In certain other myths, by contrast, paskunjis are portrayed as being hostile to humans and to have persecuted them.
- Q'ursha (ყურშა) – A legendary hunting dog associated with various mythological figures including Dali and Amirani.
- Rashi (რაში) – A magical winged horse (compare Pegasus, Buraq, Tulpar, Chollima and Rakhsh). There are three types of rashis: land rashis are well disposed to heroes and humans and could perceive the future; sea rashis are more hostile, but can take humans to the bottom of the sea, while their milk was believed to cure many illnesses; and heavenly rashis have wings and can breathe fire, and are difficult to subdue yet loyal to their owners. Kourkik Challaly, a similar magical, fiery, winged horse plays a large part (as the wise and faithful steed of successive generations of heroes) in the Armenian epic poem Daredevils of Sassoun. Like the sea rashis, Kourkik Challaly is first encountered underwater – in this instance at the bottom of an enchanted lake.
- Rokap (როკაპი) – An evil spirit, leader of the Kudiani (witches). Ghmerti punished him by chaining him to a column under the earth, where he devours human hearts brought to him by the Kudiani . Every year, he tries to free himself, but he always fails.
- T'q'ashmapa (ტყაშმაფა) is a forest entity in Mingrelian folklore. In most tales she appears as a pale woman with very long white hair, her dress and accessory (if she wears any) is also all white. She is very strong as well as vicious and violent when displeased. She seeks out men - has a preference for virgin lads - and tries to make them her lovers. Those who refuse will suffer heavy beating and other kinds of physical abuse at her hands.

== See also ==
- Armenian mythology
- Azerbaijani mythology
- Greek mythology
- Ossetian mythology
- Persian mythology
- Slavic mythology
- Vainakh mythology
