= Dali Chasma =

Chasma on Venus

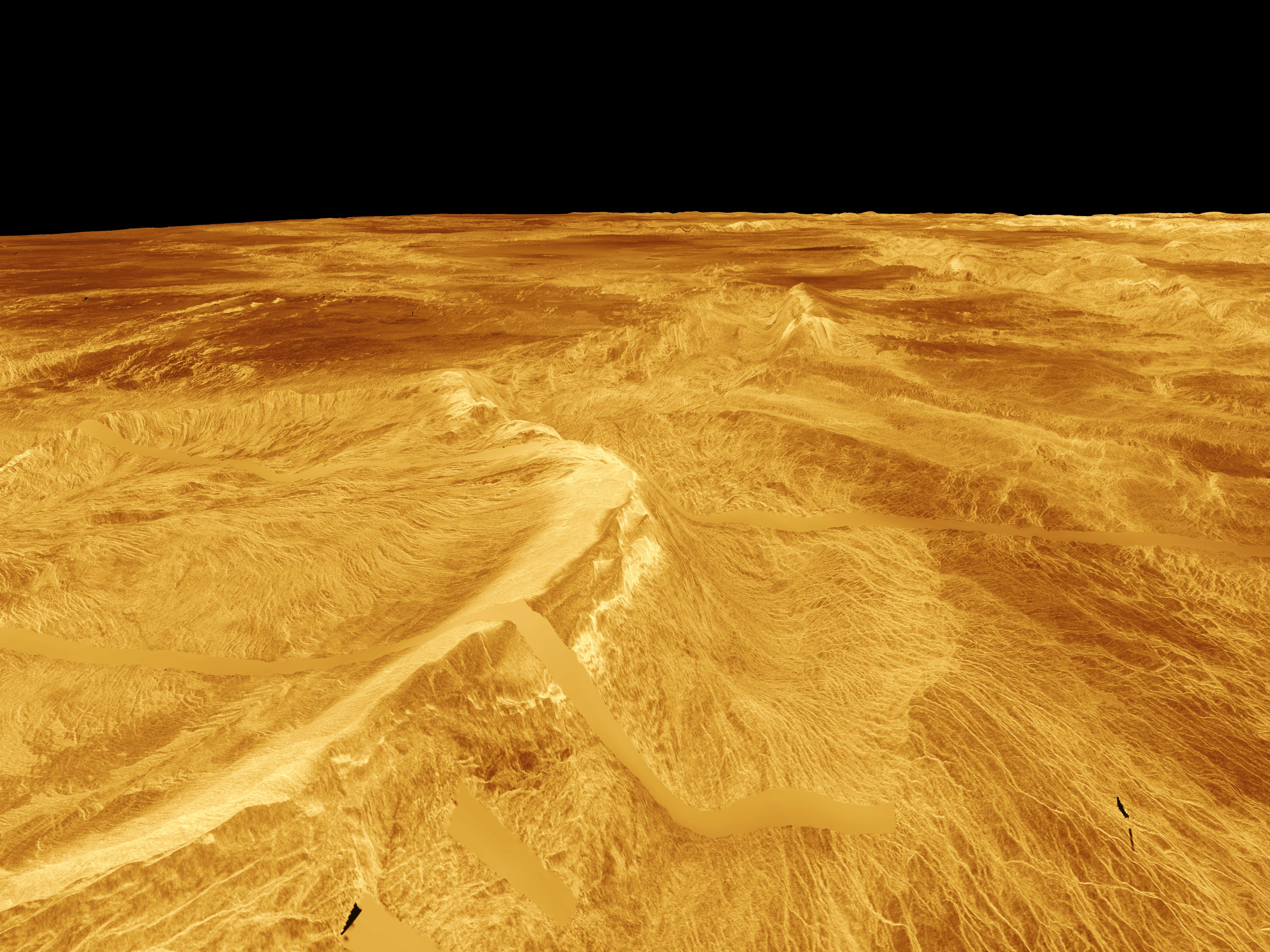
- Perspective view of Dali Chasma and Latona Corona on Venus.
- Feature type: Chasma
- Coordinates: 17.6°S 167°E
- Diameter: 7,400 km
- Eponym: Dali

The Dali and Diana Chasma system consist of deep troughs that extend for 7,400 kilometers (4,600 mi) and are very distinct features on Venus. Those chasma connect the Ovda Regio and Thetis Regio highlands with the large volcanoes at Atla Regio and thus are considered to be the "Scorpion Tail" of Aphrodite Terra. The broad, curving scarp resembles some of Earth's subduction zones where crustal plates are pushed over each other. The radar-bright surface at the highest elevation along the scarp is similar to surfaces in other elevated regions where some metallic mineral such as pyrite (fool's gold) may occur on the surface.

These features are named for the Georgian goddess Dali and the Roman goddess Diana, respectively.
