= Tetri Giorgi (disambiguation) =

Tetri Giorgi may refer to:

- Tetri Giorgi, one of the identities of St. George in Georgia
- Tetri Giorgi (organization), several organizations named after the saint
