= Armazi (god) =

Pre-Christian Georgian supreme deity

- God of gods
- Weapon: Sword
- Region: Kingdom of Iberia

Armazi or Armaz (Georgian: არმაზი) According to the medieval Georgian Chronicles, was the supreme deity in the pantheon of pre-Christian Caucasian Iberia.

== Iberian Armazi and Hittite-Luwian Arma/Armaziti ==
Georgian literary tradition credits the first king of Kartli, Pharnavaz I of Iberia (assumed to have reigned c. 302-237 BC), with the raising of the idol Armazi – reputedly named after him – on a mountain at his capital, and the construction of an Armazi fortress. The Life of Nino (9th or 10th century) describes the statue of Armazi as "a man of bronze standing; attached to his body was a golden suit of chain armor, on his head a strong helmet; for eyes he had emeralds and beryls, in his hands he held a sabre glittering like lighting, and it turned in his hands". The same account asserts that its subject, Saint Nino, a 4th-century female baptizer of the Georgians, witnessed the celebration of a great feast of dedication for the idol, and as she began praying, the idol was burnt by lightning.

The Conversion of Kartli briefly mentions a long-standing strife between Armazi and "the God of the Chaldeans - Itrushana" and that Armaz was responsible for using the sea as his weapon in their conflict. The character that mentions this fact, also credits the same Chaldean God for the destruction of the idol.

Hittite/Luwian deity Arma was the moon god and appears in a large number of theophoric personal names (e.g. Armaziti, "Man of Arma"), suggesting that he was a popular deity. In the Iron Age he completely merged with the moon god [de] of Harran and is often referred to in inscriptions as "Harranian Arma". He is depicted as a winged and bearded god with a crescent moon on his helmet. His name was written in Luwian hieroglyphs with a lunette. In curse formulae he is asked to "spear" the victim "with his horn".

== Hypotheses about the origin of Armazi ==
According to Rayfield, Mushki and Meshki (Iberians) were related to each other in the worship of gods: the Hittite moon god Armaz (Arma) and the Luwian god Santush (Santa/Sandan) are the pagan Iberian gods Armaz and Zaden whose idols were overthrown by Christian missionaries in the 4th century AD in Kingdom of Iberia.

Beyond the medieval Georgian annals, composed five or more centuries after Christianization, there are no records of the pre-Christian Georgian pantheon. Modern scholars are divided as to the origin of Armazi. It would appear to be connected to the Zoroastrian supreme god Ahura Mazdā (Middle Persian Ohrmazd, Armenian Aramazd) and contemporary archaeological evidence bears evidence to the penetration of Zoroastrianism in ancient Georgia. On the other hand, Giorgi Melikishvili proposed the identification of Armazi as a local variant of Arma, the god of the moon in Hittite mythology. This is in keeping with Ivane Javakhishvili's argument of a pre-Christian Georgian moon cult, which fused with the Christian St. George (Tetri Giorgi), Georgia's patron saint since the Middle Ages.

== See also ==
- Arma (deity)
- Luwian religion
- Tetri Giorgi
