= Adgilis Deda =

Deity in the pre-Christian Georgian pantheon

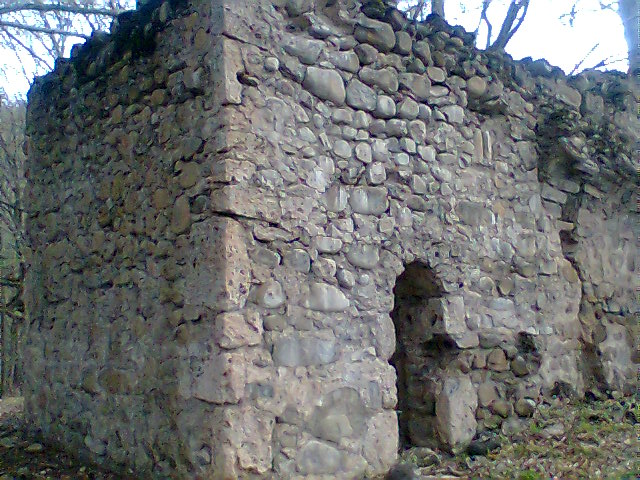
Christian basilica "Adgilis Deda" in Kakheti, Georgia

Adgilis Deda (Georgian: ადგილის დედა) — literally, the "mother of locality" or "place-mother" — is a deity in the pre-Christian Georgian pantheon, especially revered by the mountaineers of northeast Georgia, such as the Khevsurs, as a protective spirit of a place (genius loci) and also as a deity of fertility to humans and livestock alike.

The ancient Georgians believed that each place — mountain, hill, ravine — had a "mother" which they called the "place-mother". She was portrayed as a beautiful lady with silver jewelry who patronized not only the location but also the foreigners who travelled in this area. With the advent of Christianity, this cult became closely associated with that of the Virgin Mary (Mother of God). They share some common features of rituals and Adgilis Ghvtismshobeli ("Mother of God of the Place") is still worshipped as a patroness of the community among the Georgian highlanders.
