= Q'ursha =

Dog from Georgian mythology

Q'ursha (Georgian: ყურშა; also Qursha or Kursha) is a legendary dog from Georgian mythology. Although he appears in a number of different stories, he is best known as the loyal companion of the culture hero Amirani. His name means "black-ear", a common Georgian name for dogs. He was said to be born of either a raven or an eagle and is sometimes depicted as having eagle's wings as a result. Apart from his wings, Q'ursha was sometimes described with other special features: colossal paws, "lips of gold, and eyes as big as sieves". He was attributed supernatural abilities such as a thunderous bark, a leap "as big as a great field" and an infallible ability to track prey.

Q'ursha was the subject of the popular Georgian folk song "O my Kursha!", which dates back to at least the 18th century. The Georgian poet Davit Guramishvili, born in 1705, wrote of a desire to hear it again, in a poem describing his youth. There are at least twenty-seven documented versions of the song.

== Companions ==
Amirani, as a national Georgian hero, is the most prominent mythological figure associated with Q'ursha. As the son of the mountain goddess Dali and a mortal hunter, he was a demigod of enormous strength. He traveled the earth challenging "demons and dragons alike," until he decides that there are no worthy opponents left for him and issues a challenge to God himself. God chains him to a pole inside a mountain for his defiance, and his faithful hound Q'ursha is trapped along with him. Q'ursha licks Amirani's chains constantly, weakening them more and more until Amirani is almost able to escape. However, every year they would be renewed just before Q'ursha could free Amirani.

The hunter Betkil was another man said to be accompanied by Q'ursha. Unlike Amirani, Betkil was merely a mortal. The goddess Dali took him as her lover, but when he betrayed her trust by sleeping with a mortal woman, she lured him to the top of a mountain in revenge. He becomes trapped there with Q'ursha. In some versions of the story, Betkil sends Q'ursha for help, and Q'ursha returns with villagers. The villagers throw ropes, but the mountain grows taller and Bektil falls to his death. In other versions of the Betkil story, Q'ursha insists that the starving Betkil kill and eat him. Betkil kills Q'ursha and prepares a fire with his bow and arrows, but in the end, cannot bring himself to eat the dog.

Some sources refer to Q'ursha as a companion of Dali, but he is more commonly associated with hunters.
