= Bugady Musun =

Siberian Goddess

Bugady Musun was a Siberian goddess particularly revered by the Evenki people. She was the patron of wildlife and the guardian of animals. She usually took the form of a tough older woman or a huge female elk or reindeer.

== See also ==
- Dali
- Deer Woman
