= Kopala =

Kopala (Georgian: კოპალა) is a traditional hero or demigod revered in the highlands of Pshavi in Georgia. It is said that he once was in a boulder-throwing contest against a number of devebi, or ogres, to see who could throw a boulder the furthest. The ogres' champion picked up a boulder and hurled it across the valley to the mountain on the other side of the Aragvi river. Kopala tested a boulder, but decided it was too light. He picked up another boulder, pressed it against the first, and threw them both across the valley. These nearly failed to surpass the ogre's throw, but at the crucial moment, the god "Kviria" struck the boulder with his whip, causing it to fly further than the ogre's boulder, and it landed on top of the ogres' fortress of Tsikhetgori. As a result of their defeat in an ensuing battle that Kopala fought with his companion "Iakhsar", the surviving ogres retreated underground, allowing mankind to settle in the area undisturbed.

== See also ==
- Georgian mythology
