= Trialeti Chalice =

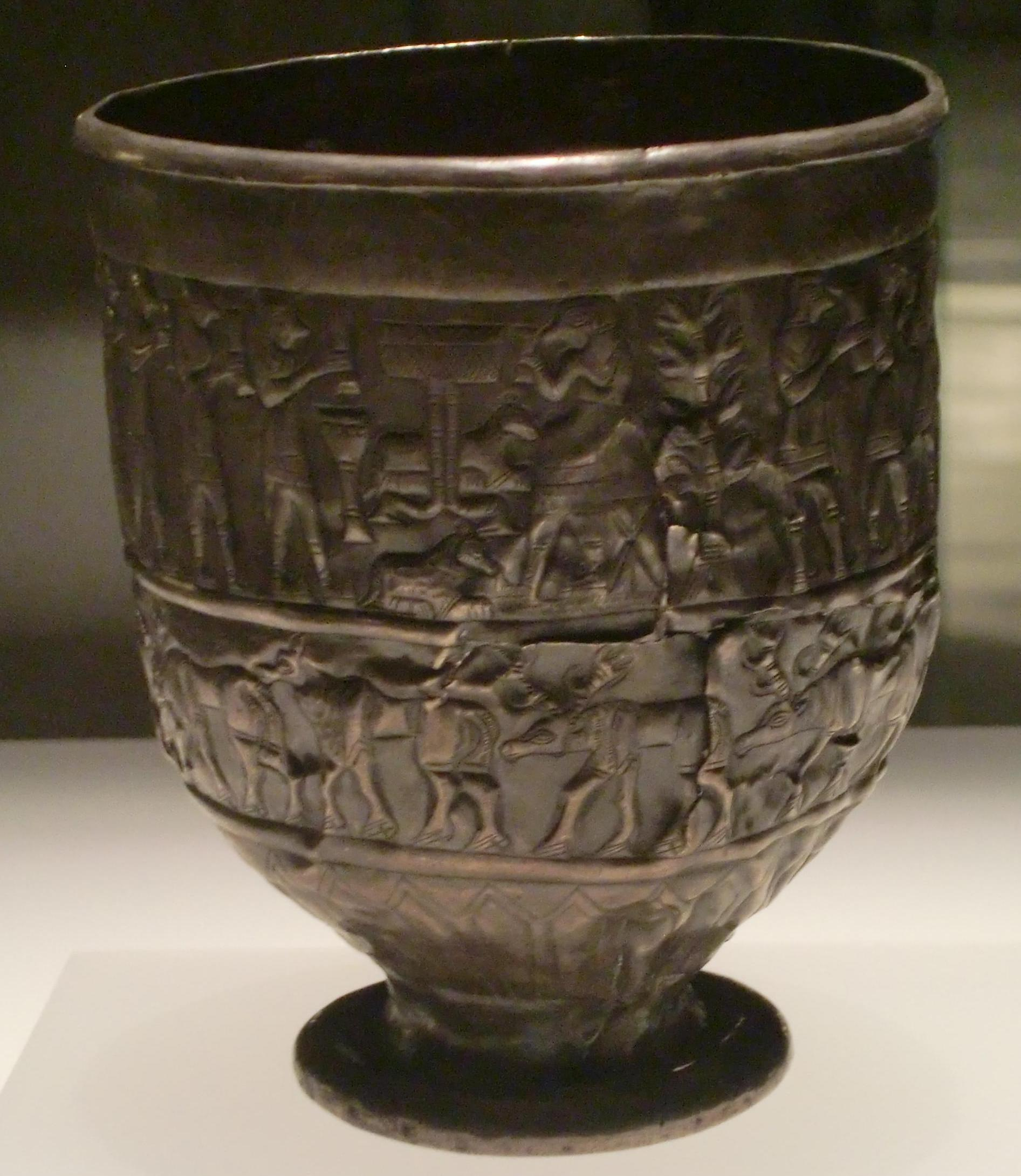
- The front of the procession and the seated man
- Material: Silver
- Created: c. 1700 BC
- Present location: Simon Janashia Museum of Georgia, Tbilisi, Georgia

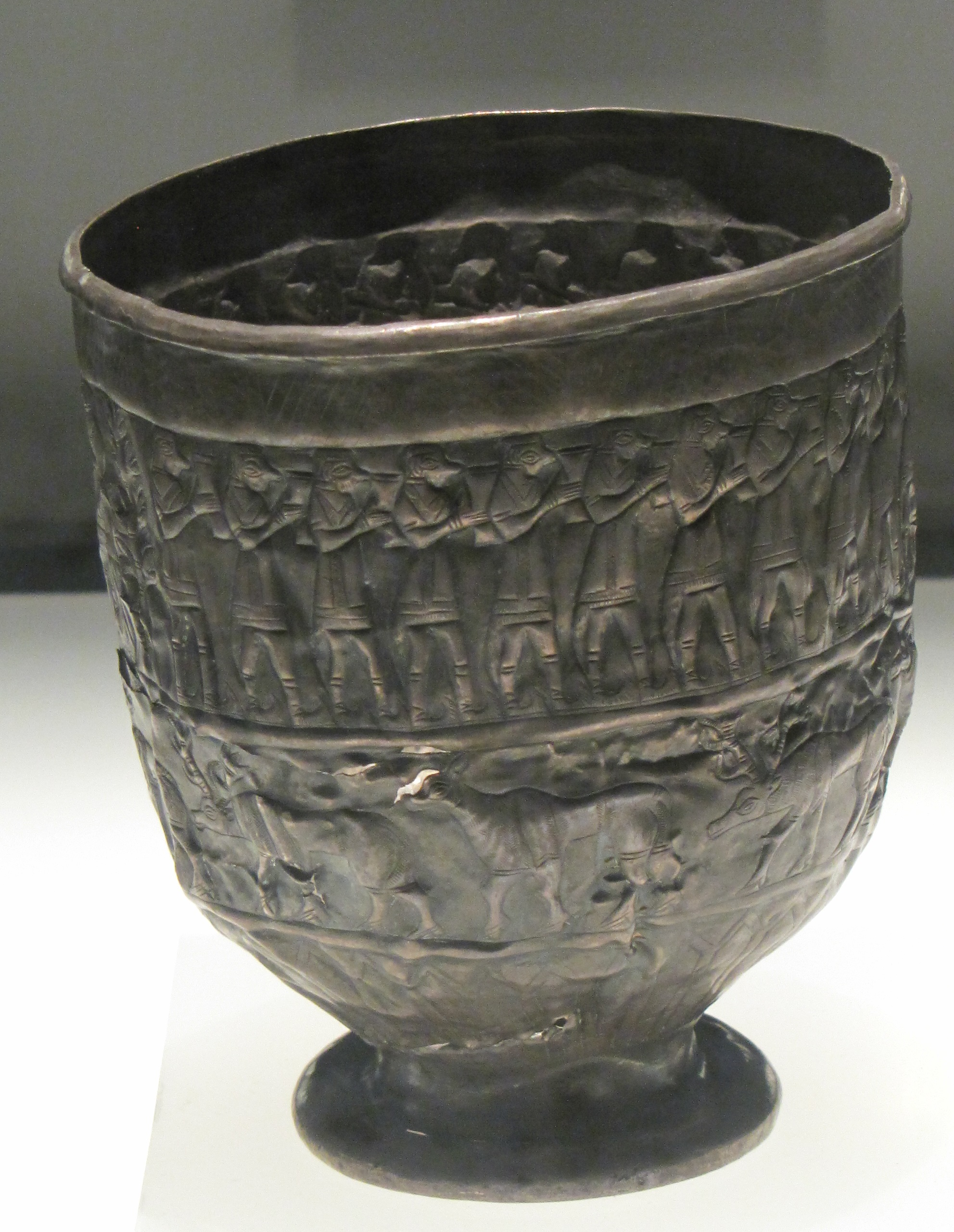
The back of the procession

The Trialeti Chalice is a silver cup from Trialeti, Georgia.

It was discovered during an archaeological expedition in the 1930s, it was one of the objects from the Trialeti culture that were excavated from Kurgan barrows in Trialeti, and has been dated to the 18th-17th centuries BC.

The outside of the cup is decorated with two processional friezes, the lower depicts nine deer, stags and hinds walking clockwise around the cup.

The upper frieze has 22 masked men bearing cups processing in the opposite direction to the deer. They are heading towards a seated man with a raised cup. Between him and the procession are a couple of animals and two other objects, and behind him is a tree. There are various speculations as to the meaning and cultural influences of the friezes. The Encyclopaedia Iranica considers the animals to be depicted in the Hittite tradition, and the tree to be the Tree of Life. Others interpret an Egyptian influence, describing the men as wearing masks similar to those of the priests of the Egyptian god Osiris.

The cup is now in the collection of the Simon Janashia Museum of Georgia in Tbilisi.
