= Kevin Tuite =

American linguist

Kevin Tuite (Irish: Caoimhín de Tiúit; born April 3, 1954) is a full Professor of Anthropology at the Université de Montréal. He is a citizen of both Canada and Ireland. His special interest is in Caucasian linguistics, and he has occasionally published on the topic of Georgian mythology.

== Biography ==
Tuite was born 3 April 1954, in South Bend, Indiana, USA. He received a BA in chemical engineering from Northwestern University in 1976, and a Ph.D. in linguistics from the University of Chicago in 1988. His doctoral thesis was "Number agreement and morphosyntactic orientation in the Kartvelian languages". From 1991 on, he has been a member of the faculty at Université de Montréal: professeur adjoint 1991–1996, professeur agrégé 1996–2002, professeur titulaire 2002–present. From 2010 through 2014 he was the Chair of Caucasian studies at Friedrich-Schiller-Universität Jena.

== Books ==
- Kartvelian Morphosyntax. Number agreement and morphosyntactic orientation in the South Caucasian languages. (Studies in Caucasian Linguistics, 12). München: Lincom Europa. 1998
- Svan (Languages of the World / Materials, vol. 139). München: Lincom Europa, 1997.
- An anthology of Georgian folk poetry. Madison, NJ: Fairleigh Dickinson University Press, 1994.
