= Nestan-Darejan =

Nestan-Darejan (Georgian: ნესტან-დარეჯანი) is a Georgian feminine given name, derived from the Persian nest andare jahan, roughly translated as "the matchless". It occurs in the epic poem by the 12th-century Georgian poet Shota Rustaveli. Afterwards, the name and its derivatives, Nestan (ნესტანი) and Darejan (დარეჯანი), were frequent in the Georgian royalty.

Notable people named Nestan-Darejan, Nestan, or Darejan were:

- Nestan-Darejan of Kakheti, Queen of Kartli (fl. 1556–1612), Princess of Kakheti and Queen Consort of Kartli
- Darejan of Kakheti, Queen of Imereti (c. 1615 – 1668), Princess of Kakheti and Queen Consort of Imereti
- Princess Darejan of Imereti (c. 1670 – 6 October 1740), Princess of Imereti
- Darejan Dadiani (20 July 1738 – 8 November 1807), Princess of Mingrelia and Queen Consort of Georgia
