= Zaden =

Fertility god in Georgian mythology

Zaden (/ˈzeɪdən/; Georgian: ზადენი, romanized: zadeni) was, according to the medieval Georgian chronicles, the god of fruitfulness in a pre-Christian pantheon of the ancient Georgians of Kartli (Iberia of the Classical sources). King Parnajom of Iberia (109–90 BC) is reported to have built a fortress at Mount Zedazeni to house the colossus of Zadeni which, along with other pagan idols, are said to have been destroyed through the prayers of St. Nino, a 4th-century female baptizer of Georgians.

Beyond the passages from the medieval annals and the surviving toponym of Zedazeni (from Zeda Zadeni, i.e. "Upper Zaden"), we lack contemporary records and archaeological evidence about this cult, however. Zaden is surmised by several modern scholars to have been a Georgian version of the Luwian Santas or the Hittite Sandon, but the identification with Yazata of Zoroastrianism has also been suggested.

== Legacy ==
The crater Zadeni in the southern hemisphere of the dwarf planet Ceres was named after this deity.
