= Tetri Giorgi =

Name for Saint George in Georgia

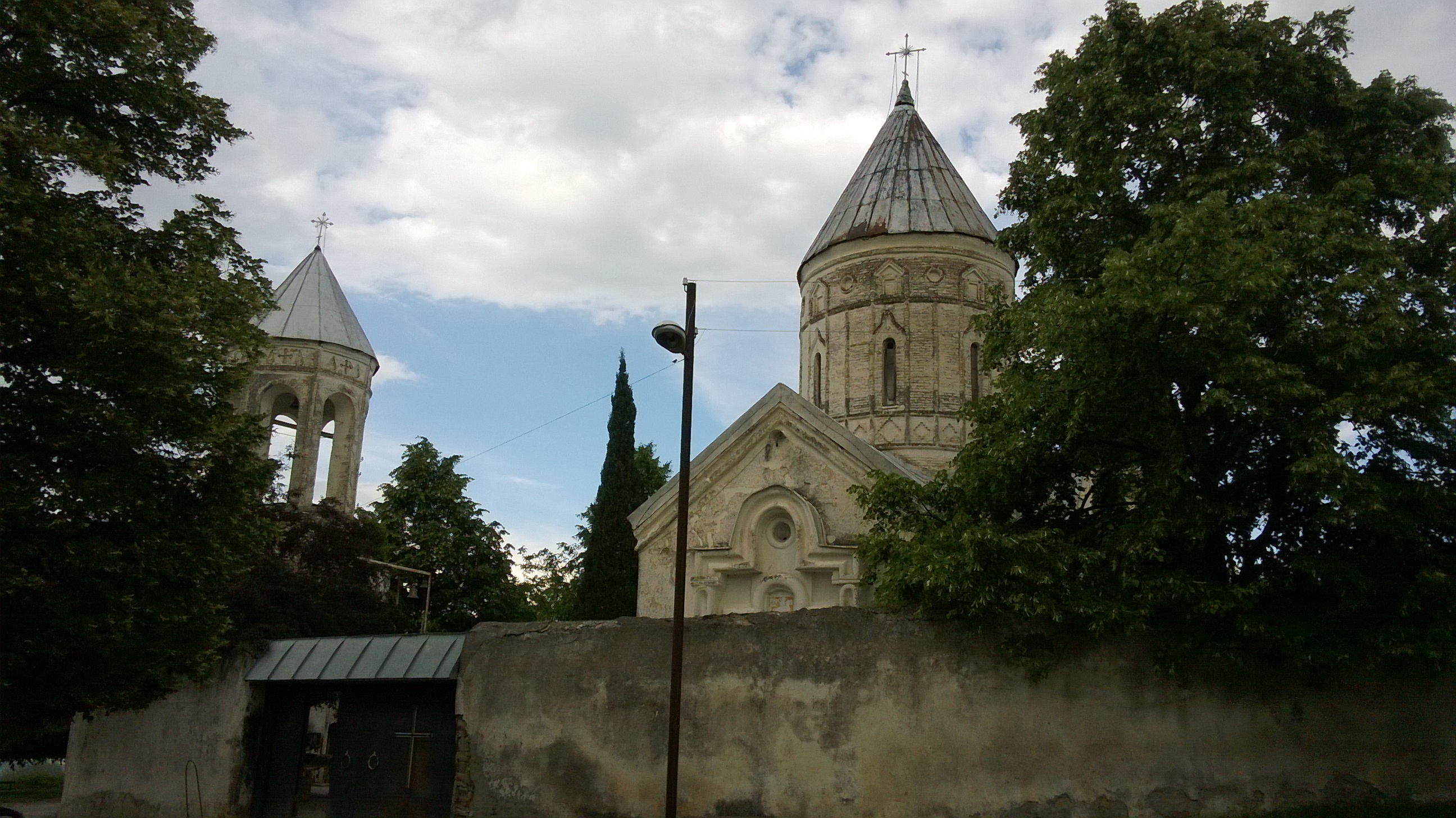
The Tetri Giorgi Church near Alaverdi Monastery in Akhmeta, Georgia.

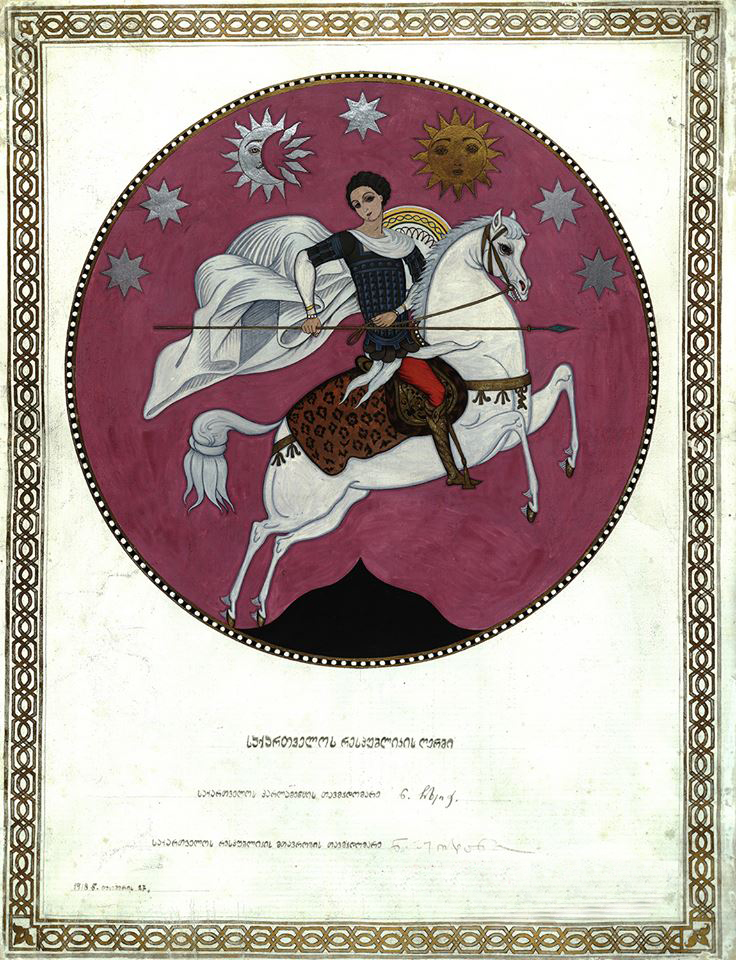
Tetri Giorgi and the Seven Celestials – 1918 design of the emblem of the Democratic Republic of Georgia.

Tetri Giorgi (Georgian: თეთრი გიორგი, "White George") is one of the local names of Christian Saint George in Georgia, specifically in the country's northeastern highland districts.

Tetri Giorgi was used as a national symbol, as part of Georgia's coat of arms in the years 1918–1921 and 1991–2004. The name of Tetri Giorgi has also been adopted by several political and non-political organizations, significantly by an anti-Soviet Georgian émigré group in Europe and a 1990s paramilitary unit.

== History ==
Saint George was venerated in Georgia since Late Antiquity. The exonym Georgia was applied to the country from the 11th or 12th century, probably by false etymology, but inspired by the great popularity of the saint there.

The cult of Tetri Giorgi is associated with the Kakheti region in particular. It is syncretistic, combining the Christian saint with the cult of a local lunar deity.

A feast day of Tetri Giorgi (tetrigiorgoba) separate from the feast day of the Christian saint was once marked annually on 14 August, when many pilgrims from the eastern Georgian provinces attended an overnight feast at the saint's chief shrine – a 14th-century church overlooking the village Atsquri in what is now Akhmeta Municipality, Kakheti.

== In heraldry ==
In May 1918, the Democratic Republic of Georgia – newly independent from the Russian Empire – chose the equestrian depiction of Tetri Giorgi as a centerpiece of its coat of arms. But the image was rendered more secular as its Christian symbolism was disfavored by Georgia's Social-Democratic government, recalls Revaz Gabashvili, a critic of the contemporary Georgian government. In this design, Tetri Giorgi is shown as an armed horseman below a depiction of "the Seven Celestials" (the seven classical planets).

This coat of arms was in use until the Soviet takeover in 1921 and again in post-Soviet Georgia from 1991 to 2004.

== See also ==
- Tetri Giorgi (organization)
- Armazi (god)
- Kopala
- Uastyrdzhi
- Saint George and the Dragon
