= Battle of the Abas =

65 BC battle

- Part of the Caucasian campaign of Pompey
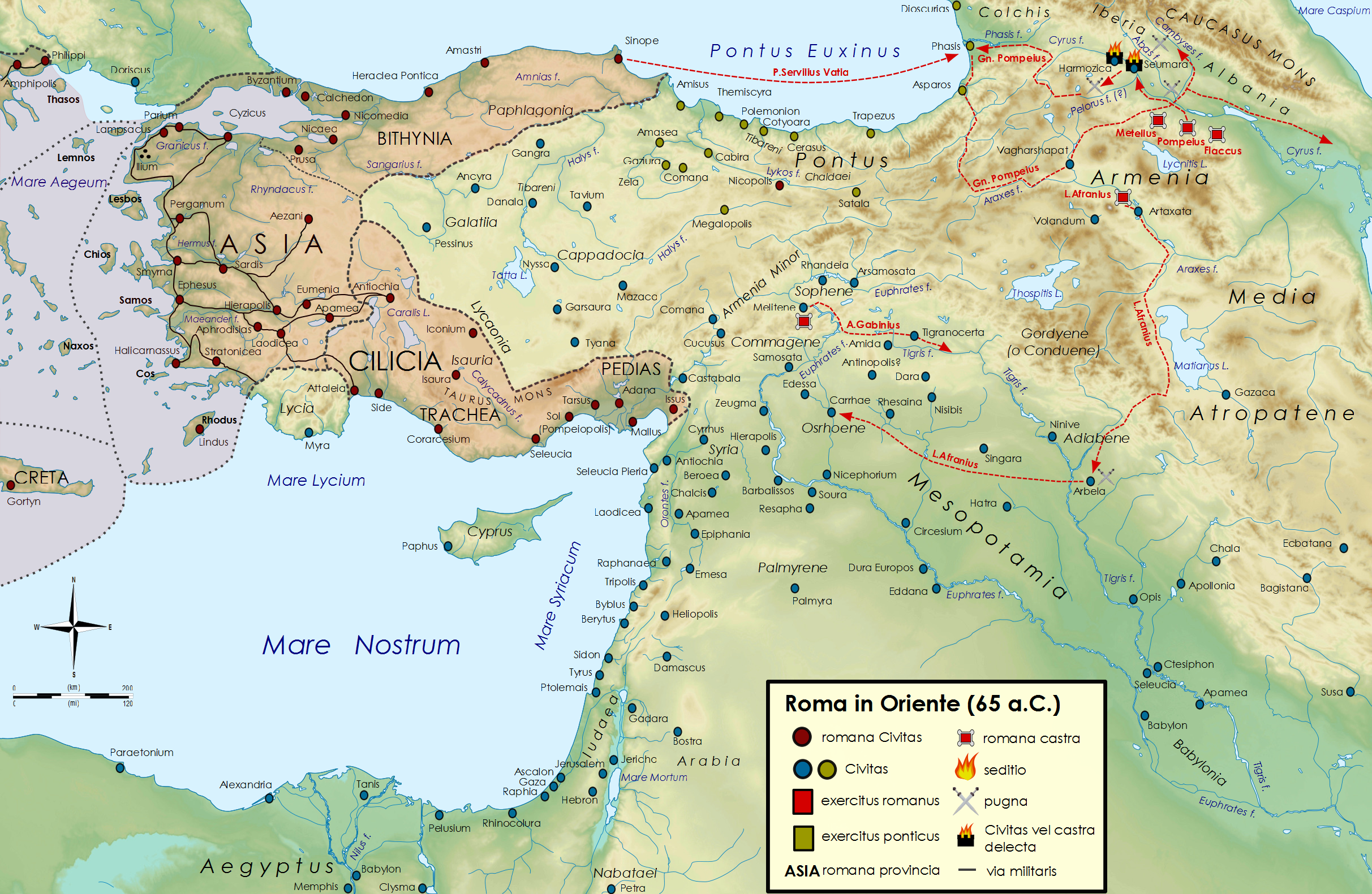
Date	65 BC
Location	Alazani, Caucasian Albania
Result	Roman victory

Belligerents
Roman Republic	Kingdom of Albania

Commanders and leaders
Pompey Magnus	Oroeses; Cosis

Strength
Unknown (Superior to Oroeses')	60,000 infantry 12,000 cavalry

Casualties and losses
Unknown	Unknown

The Battle of the Abas was fought in 65 BC between the forces of the Roman Republic under Pompey Magnus and those of the Caucasian Albanian King Oroeses during the course of the Third Mithridatic War. The battle took place on a flat plain by the River Abas (likely the modern Alazani), after the Roman forces had only recently crossed over it from the other bank, and with much dense forest nearby. Pompey's victory neutralised the threat of the Albanians rejoining with their old ally Mithridates in his attempts to rekindle his lost war with Rome.

The battle is noteworthy for Pompey's concealment of his infantry behind a screen of cavalry, which would twenty years later be used against him at the Battle of Pharsalus. The near perfect double envelopment Pompey is reported to have here achieved also serves to showcase the high quality of his generalship during the Eastern campaigns.

== Campaign ==
Having defeated Mithridates and Tigranes of Armenia, Pompey then turned to neutralising Mithridates' remaining allies to the north, in Caucasian Albania and Iberia. In December 66 BC, the Albanian king, Oroeses had pre-emptively attacked the Roman forces but been defeated and then forced to submit. In pursuit of Mithridates, who had fled to Colchis, Pompey marched into the Caucasus the following year and defeated the Iberians under their king Artoces at the Battle of the Pelorus and continued on into Colchis. However, Mithridates fled ever further before him, to Panticapaeum in Crimea, and Pompey ceased his pursuit at the mouth of the River Phasis, sending on a portion of his fleet under Servilius to keep up the search, but turning himself and his army back south into Armenia.

From Armenia, however, Pompey was forced to again march north in order to deal for a second time with Oroeses, who had revolted at the first opportunity. In the summer of 65 BC therefore, the Romans crossed again into Albania. The obstacle of the fast-flowing River Cyrus (or Cyrnus) was surmounted by having the horses and pack animals cross upstream of the main army, in order to "break the violence of the current with their bodies", as Dio says, so that the bulk of Pompey's force could then ford the shallows further downstream, without being swept off their feet. With the Romans advancing through Albania, Oroeses nonetheless refused to give battle, and Pompey had to continue the march ever deeper into enemy territory, looking for a decisive engagement. The march was made during excessive heat and with little carried water, and so upon reaching the River Cambyses (likely the Iori), the thirsty Romans drank excessively of the cold waters, which, however, due to their chill, caused many to fall ill. In consequence, Pompey had ten thousand animal skin flasks supplied and filled with drinking water for the march. Still without resistance, Pompey then continued to the Abas, and crossed it; now approaching the shadow of the Greater Caucasus Mountains.

Having forded the Abas, word came that Oroeses and his men were nearby and, according to Appian, planning to ambush the Romans by suddenly converging on them from the nearby forest. Hoping to encourage the Albanians to indeed offer a pitched battle and emerge from the surrounding woodland, Pompey was anxious not to reveal his superiority in numbers, and so concealed much of his infantry behind a screen of cavalry; the legionaries kneeling motionless behind their shields. Viewing the scene from the front, and therefore thinking the Roman force consisted almost solely of cavalry and the rest were elsewhere, Oroeses took the bait, and duly attacked.

== Battle ==
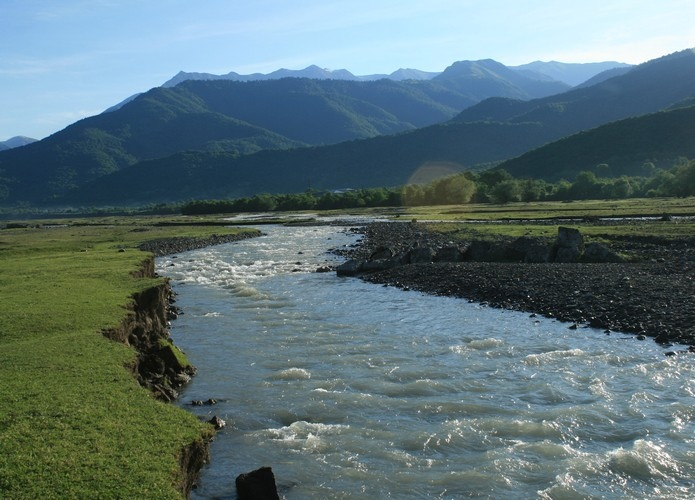
Part of the Alazani River today, showing riverside plains and heavily forested land surrounding it.

Pompey had placed his cavalry in a thin screen ahead of his hidden infantry, and when the Albanians charged out of the woods the Roman horsemen turned and pretended to flee, in order to draw the enemy in. The Albanians pursued, the Roman cavalry passed through the concealed lines of infantry, which then suddenly rose. The Albanians charged Pompey's infantry, the Romans purposively extended their line before them, bending it inwards like a bow. The enemy, drawn in ever further, soon found itself almost completely encircled. The retreating cavalry, having passed behind the infantry, then split into two and wheeled about, one going left the other right, and rode along the edges of the battlefield before turning in again and smashing into the enemy rear from behind. A large part of the Albanian force was thus assailed on all sides and caught by Pompey in a perfect encirclement almost as complete, and achieved in a similar way, as that effected by Hannibal at the Battle of Cannae. The manoeuvre complete, it simply remained, as Dio says, to "cut down those caught inside the circle", and this the Romans proceeded to do.

Plutarch writes that this attack of the Albanians was led by a brother of Oroeses named Cosis who, when the fighting was thus raging at close quarters, "rushed upon Pompey himself and smote him with a javelin on the fold of his breastplate." Pompey however, duly engaging in personal combat with the royal brother, soon gained the victory by running Cosis through with his sword and leaving him dead on the field.

Those Albanians who had managed to escape the encirclement, or who had not charged full ahead, now sought to melt back into the surrounding trees and flee, presumably including in their number Oroeses himself, who survived. But Pompey sent men to strategically fire parts of the forest and many fleeing Albanian warriors were forced back out into the open to be slaughtered, the flames catching others. After the fires had raged for some time, most of the surviving Albanians emerged to surrender.

== Aftermath ==
Both Plutarch and Appian record rumours that a number of Amazons were among the captured at the end of this battle, having crossed down from the mountains to fight with the men of Albania. The women taken prisoner were seen to bear wounds suffered in the fighting alongside the men. Plutarch says no woman was found among the dead, but that many Amazonian shields and buskins were seized among the booty.

Having gained the decisive victory he sought, and with the Albanians suing for peace, Pompey subdued the country and left triumphant. Oroeses seems to have been allowed to retain his throne and, suitably chastened, was granted peace. Plutarch records that he at first set out directly each toward the Caspian Sea, "but was turned back by a multitude of deadly reptiles when he was only three days march distant, and withdrew into Lesser Armenia."

A similar trick as that utilised here by Pompey to conceal a force of infantry behind a screen of cavalry would later be used against him by Julius Caesar at the Battle of Pharsalus, at which Pompey would be defeated.
