= Artavasdes I of Armenia =

Artavasdes I
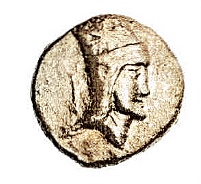
- Coin of Artavasdes I

King of Armenia
- Reign: 160 BC – 115 BC
- Predecessor: Artaxias I
- Successor: Tigranes I
- Died: 115 BC
- Issue: Artaxias I of Iberia
- Dynasty: Artaxiad
- Father: Artaxias I

Artavasdes I (also spelled Artawazd/Artavazd) was the Artaxiad king of Armenia from approximately 160 BC to 115 BC. He was the son and successor of Artaxias I. Little is known about his reign. He is the subject of ancient Armenian folk traditions, which are recorded by later Armenian authors.

In c. 120 BC, the Parthian king Mithridates II (r. 124–91 BC) defeated Artavasdes I and made him acknowledge Parthian suzerainty. Artavasdes was forced to give the Parthians Tigranes (the future king Tigranes the Great) as a hostage, who was either his son or nephew.

According to Cyril Toumanoff, Artavasdes I can be identified with the Armenian king who, according to the medieval Georgian annals, interfered in Iberia at the request of local nobility and installed his son, Artaxias, on the throne of Iberia, thereby inaugurating the Iberian Artaxiad dynasty.

== Name ==
Artavasdes is the Latinized version of the Old Iranian name Ṛtavazdā, identical to the Avestan Ašavazdah, presumably meaning "powerful/persevering through truth" or "he whose justness is constant/lasting". In Armenian, this name is rendered Artawazd (Արտաւազդ, also transliterated Artavazd).

== Reign ==
Not much is known about Artavasdes's reign. After the death of King Artaxias, Artavasdes inherited the throne and became king in approximately 160 BC. Khorenatsi writes that Artavasdes expelled his brothers from the royal province of Ayrarat to Aghiovit and Arberan, except for his heir Tigranes. According to the Roman historian Justin, in 120 BC, the Parthian king Mithradates II invaded Armenia and defeated Artavasdes. Artavasdes was forced to recognize Parthian suzerainty over Armenia, as well as give Mithradates II his nephew, Tigranes (the future Tigranes II the Great), as a hostage.

According to Cyril Toumanoff, Artavasdes I can likely be identified with the Armenian king mentioned in The Georgian Chronicles who interfered in Iberia at the request of the local nobility and installed his son, Artaxias, on the throne of Iberia, thereby inaugurating the Iberian Artaxiad dynasty. According to The Georgian Chronicles the eristavis (princes) of Iberia requested the aid of the Armenian king to dethrone King Paranjom, who was attempting to spread the Zoroastrian faith among his people, and in his place enthrone Artavasdes's son Artaxias, who was married to a Pharnavazid princess. Artavasdes agreed to enthrone his son as king and received hostages from the eristavis. The eristavis of Iberia then renounced their support for Parnajom and Artavasdes and Artaxias advanced towards Kartli. The eristavis who broke off from Parnajom joined the Armenian army at Tashir. Parnajom called for aid from the Parthians and marched down to Tashir. A battle broke out and Parnajom was defeated and killed by the joint Iberian-Armenian army. Artavasdes's son was then placed on the Iberian throne.

Movses Khorenatsi writes that Artavasdes died childless and was succeeded by his brother Tigranes. This corresponds with Appian's (2nd century) assertion that Tigranes the Great was not the son of Artavasdes, but rather the son of Tigranes I, Artavasdes's brother and successor.

== In Movses Khorenatsi's History of Armenia ==
The Armenian historian Movses Khorenatsi (5th century or later) gives information about Artavasdes's life, which he drew from Armenian epics and folklore. Vahan Kurkjian writes that the information on Artavasdes's life is "wholly legendary," while historian Hakob Manandian notes that Khorenatsi's history contains some important historical information about the early Artaxiad kings preserved in folkloric sources. Armen Petrosyan and James R. Russell suggest that Khorenatsi's Artavasdes I is modeled on or conflated with the later Artaxiad king Artavasdes II.

Khorenatsi writes that Artavasdes I was the oldest son of five of Artaxias I and his Alan wife Satenik. Artavasdes is described as brave, but jealous, cruel, selfish, and power-hungry. When he came of age, his father made him responsible for governing the eastern regions of Armenia and appointed him sparapet.

=== Conflict with the Muratseans ===
Artavasdes found out about an affair between the noble Argam Muratsean and Satenik. Upon finding out, he convinced King Artaxias that Argam was plotting against him and planned to take over the kingdom. Artaxias granted Artavasdes Argam's second rank role. They later went to a banquet held by Argam and, on the pretext of a suspicion of a plot, Artavasdes began to quarrel with Argam. Amongst the confusion, King Artaxias returned to Artaxata and sent back his other son Mazhan with an army to slaughter many of the Muratseans, burn down Argam's palace, and to bring Mandu, one of Argam's concubines. Two years later, Artaxias ordered Argam to give up his possessions. Unsatisfied, Artavasdes also seized Naxuana and all the fortresses and villages south of the Araxes. He appropriated Argam's palace and renamed it to Artavazd's Palace. Unable to bear this, one of Argam's son instigated a rebellion, which was put down by Artavasdes, who slaughtered all the eminent men of the Muratsean family.

=== Smbat's departure ===
After quelling the Caspian uprising, Smbat Bagratuni was awarded by Artaxias the royal portion of Goghtn and the springs of Ught. This caused Artavasdes to become jealous and started plotting against Smbat. King Artaxias eventually caught wind of this plot and was greatly disturbed. Meanwhile, Smbat left his position in the army and retired in Tmorik. With Smbat's absence, Artavasdes was granted command over the entire army. Seeking justice for the wrongdoings caused against Smbat, Mazhan requested that Artavasdes and his brother Tigranes be exiled and that the kingdom instead be entrusted to Artaxias's other son Zariadres. After King Artaxias denied this request, Mazhan began plotting against Tigranes. However, the plot was made known to Tigranes and Artavasdes, and during a hunting trip, killed Mazhan and buried him at Bagavan.

=== Seleucid invasion ===
In 165/4 BC, Antiochus IV Epiphanes invaded Armenia, capturing King Artaxias and pushing Tigranes's army to Basen. The Iberians, using this opportunity, invaded from the north. Artavasdes and Smbat hastened and joined Tigranes, while Zariadres headed north to counter the Iberian invasion. The Seleucid army was defeated and forced to return home due to internal troubles. However, Zariadres was captured by the Iberians after losing a battle. Three years later, Smbat, Artavasdes, and Tigranes brought their armies to Trialeti, but negotiated with the Iberians, managing to return Zariadres and achieve an alliance with the Iberians, while ceding the regions of Javakheti and Ardahan. King Artaxias returned to Armenia in 161/0 BC, but fell ill and died in Bakurakert in 160 BC.

=== Folk tradition regarding death ===
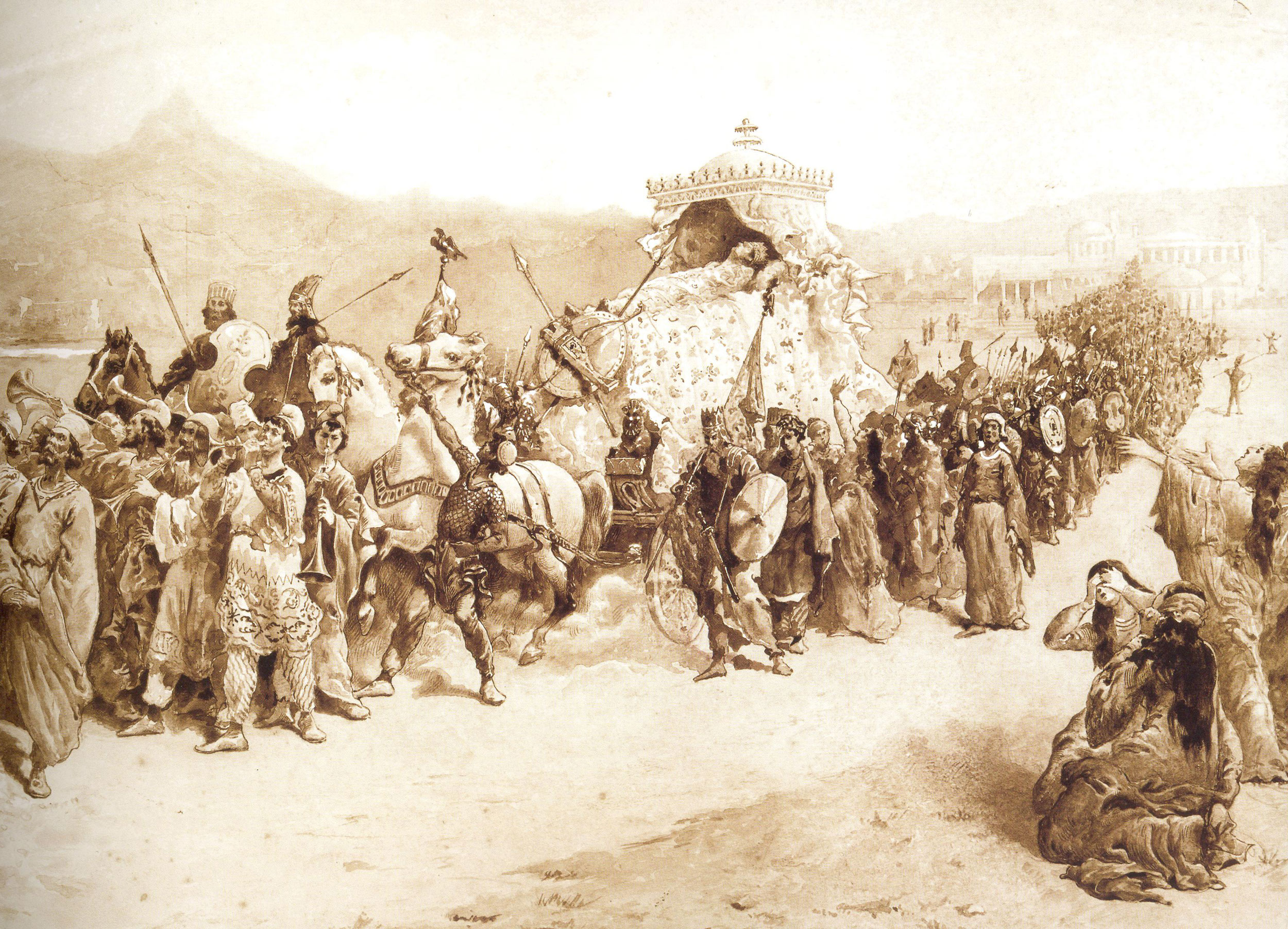
Painting of Artaxias's funeral by Giuseppe Canella

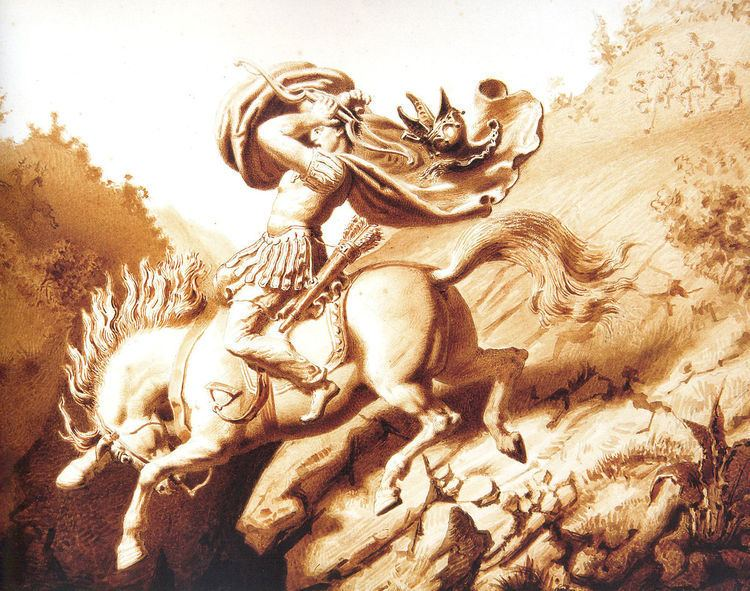
Artavasdes I falling into the cave of Masis

Khorenatsi relates a folk tradition about Artavasdes's death which he attributes to the minstrels of Goghtn. Many sacrifices were made in the country on the occasion of Artaxias I's death, in accordance with Armenian custom. Artavasdes complained to his dead father: "Since you went and took all the land with you, / to what purpose shall I reign over these ruins?" Artaxias cursed his son from the grave with the following words: "If you go hunting up on Noble Masis, / the spirits [k’ajk’] will seize you and take you up to Noble Masis; / there you will remain and no more see the light." Khorenatsi writes that Armenian elders in his time would tell the tale that Artavasdes was imprisoned in a cave, with two dogs constantly gnawing at his chains so that their master would be freed and destroy the world. However, his chains are strengthened by the sound of blacksmiths' hammering. For this reason, blacksmiths would strike their anvils three or four times on Sundays. The 5th-century Armenian author Eznik of Kolb writes that superstitious Armenians believed that Artavazd was imprisoned by evil demons. According to Eznik, just as the Jews expected the coming of their king David, so did Armenians believe that Artavasdes will return and rule the world.

Khorenatsi's realistic interpretation of the folk traditions is that just a few days after becoming king, Artavasdes went on a hunting trip near Mount Ararat and, "confused by some giddiness," he turned on his horse and fell into a large pit and disappeared. He adds that the version that seems most likely to him is that "from his birth he [Artavasdes] was merely mad until he died thereof." In Stepan Malkhasyants's view, in these folk traditions and Khorenatsi's work the historical figure of Artavasdes is merged with the folkloric trope common among many cultures of a figure imprisoned for eternity in a mountain. It has also been suggested that the tradition of Artavasdes imprisoned in the mountain reflects the popular memory of Artavasdes II, the later Artaxiad king who was taken prisoner by Mark Antony to Egypt. The tradition also shares features with the story of Little Mher, one of the heroes of the Armenian national epic Daredevils of Sassoun, who is imprisoned in a mountain because of his father's curse. Parallels have also been drawn with the Iranian deity Mithra, worshipped by Armenians as Mihr, who the ancient Armenians believed would emerge when the world's existence is threatened in order to defeat evil.

== Coinage ==
Only two types of coins have been attributed to Artavasdes I, both written in Greek. The obverse of these coins depict Artavasdes wearing an Armenian tiara. The reverses of the coins either depict Athena standing with a spear and shield, or an eagle atop a mountain.

== Sources ==
- Achaṛyan, Hrachʻya (1942). "Artawazd" Արտաւազդ. Hayotsʻ andznanunneri baṛaran Հայոց անձնանունների բառարան [Dictionary of Armenian personal names] (in Armenian). Vol. I. Erevan: Petakan hamalsarani hratarakchʻutʻyun. pp. 310-316.
- Garsoïan, Nina (1997). "The Emergence of Armenia". In Hovannisian, Richard G. (ed.). The Armenian People from Ancient to Modern Times. Vol. 1. New York: St. Martin's Press. pp. 37–62. ISBN 0-312-10169-4.
- Garsoian, N. (2005). "Tigran II". In Yarshater, Ehsan (ed.). Encyclopædia Iranica (Online ed.). Encyclopædia Iranica Foundation.
- Kovacs, Frank L. (2016). Armenian Coinage in the Classical Period. Lancaster, Pennsylvania: Classical Numismatic Group. ISBN 978-0-9837652-4-0. OCLC 956380761.
- Kurkjian, Vahan M. (1958). A History of Armenia. Michigan: Armenian General Benevolent Union of America.
- Jones, Stephen; Metreveli, Roin, eds. (2014). The Georgian Chronicles of Kʻartʻlis Cʻxovreba (A History of Georgia): translated and with commentary. Sakʿartʿvelos mecʿnierebatʿa akademia. Tbilisi: Artanuji. ISBN 978-9941-445-52-1. OCLC 883445390.
- Manandyan, Hakob (1977). Erker Երկեր [Works] (in Armenian). Vol. I. Erevan: Haykakan SSH GA hratarakchʻutʻyun.
- Moses Khorenatsʻi (1978). History of the Armenians. Translation and commentary by Robert W. Thomson. Cambridge, Massachusetts: Harvard University Press. ISBN 0-674-39571-9.
- Movses Khorenatsʻi (1997). Sargsyan, Gagik (ed.). Hayotsʻ Patmutʻyun, E dar Հայոց Պատմություն, Ե դար [History of Armenia, 5th century] (in Armenian). Introduction and notes by Stepan Malkhasyants. Erevan: Hayastan. ISBN 5-540-01192-9.
- Olbrycht, Marek Jan (2009). "Mithridates VI Eupator and Iran". In Højte, Jakob Munk (ed.). Mithridates VI and the Pontic Kingdom. Black Sea Studies. Vol. 9. Aarhus University Press. pp. 163–190. ISBN 978-8779344433. ISSN 1903-4873.
- Petrosyan, Armen (2018). "Haykakan Satʻenikě ev nra kovkasyan zugaheṛnerě" Հայկական Սաթենիկը և նրա կովկասյան զուգահեռները [Armenian Satenik and her Caucasian parallels]. Lraber hasarakakan gitutʻyunneri (3): 310–331.
- Rapp, Stephen H. (2003). Studies in Medieval Georgian Historiography: Early Texts and Eurasian Contexts. Peeters. ISBN 978-2-87723-723-9.
- Russell, James R. (2004). "Some Iranian Images of Kingship in the Armenian Artaxiad Epic". Armenian and Iranian Studies. Belmont, MA: Armenian Heritage Press. pp. 157–174. ISBN 978-0-935411-19-5.
- Schmitt, R. (1986). "Artavasdes". Encyclopaedia Iranica, Vol. II, Fasc. 6. p. 653.
- Simonyan, Abel, ed. (1976). "Artavazd A" Արտավազդ Ա [Artavazd I]. Haykakan sovetakan hanragitaran Հայկական սովետական հանրագիտարան [Armenian Soviet Encyclopedia] (in Armenian). Vol. 2. Erevan: Haykakan SSH Gitutʻyunneri Akademia. pp. 144.
- Simonyan, Abel, ed. (1976). "«Artavazd»" «Արտավազդ». Haykakan sovetakan hanragitaran Հայկական սովետական հանրագիտարան [Armenian Soviet Encyclopedia] (in Armenian). Vol. 2. Erevan: Haykakan SSH Gitutʻyunneri Akademia. pp. 143–144.

Artavasdes I of Armenia Artaxiad dynasty
| Preceded by Artaxias I | King of Armenia; 159 BC – 115 BC | Succeeded by Tigranes I |
