= Arsak =

Arsak may refer to:

- alternative transliteration of Artsakh, see Artsakh (disambiguation)
- Ashk (given name), an ancient male given name
- Arshak, an Armenian given name
- Arsaces, Greek form of Arshak

== See also ==
- Arsac, a commune in France
