= Ashk (given name) =

Male given name

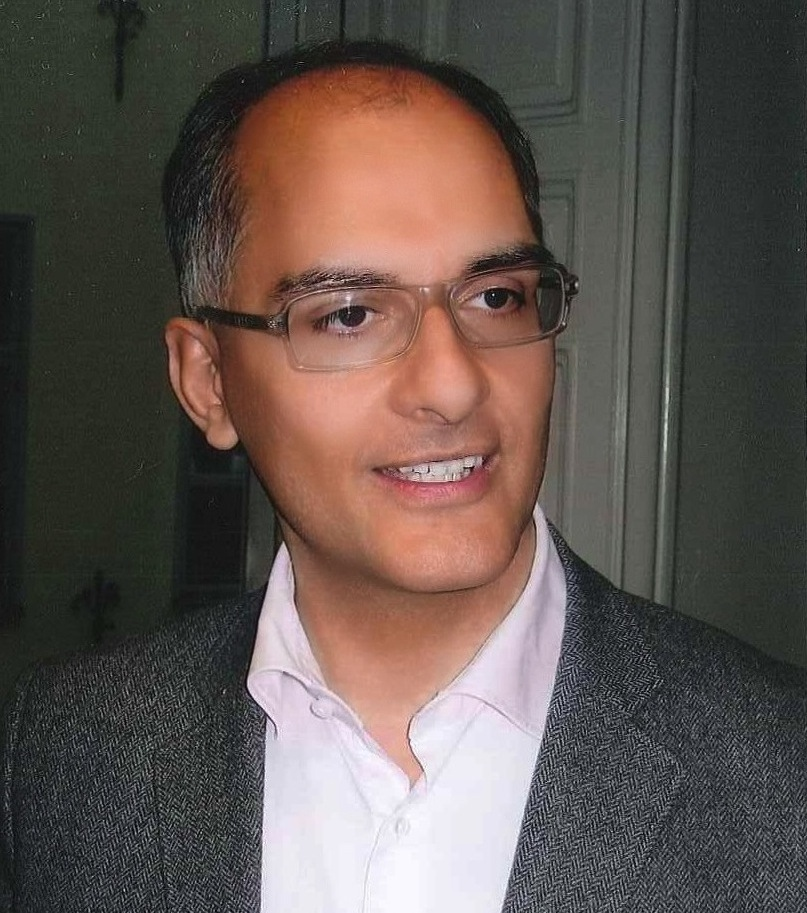
Ashk Peter Dahlén

Ashk (Persian: اشک) is an ancient male given name of Iranian origin. It also appears as Old Persian: 𐎠𐎼𐏁𐎣 Aršaka, Parthian: 𐭀𐭓𐭔𐭊 Aršak, Armenian: Արշակ, or Arsaces (Ancient Greek: Ἀρσάκης).

The name was held by the first kings of the Parthian (Arsacid) dynasty, as well as some Armenians.

== Places ==
- Arshak or Asaak, a capital city of Parthian Empire

== People ==
- Arshak II of Arsacid Armenia
- Arshak or Artaxias I of Iberia
- Arshak II of Iberia
- Ashk Dahlén (born 1972), Swedish Iranologist and linguist
- Ashk Adamiyat, son of Fereydun Adamiyat
- Ibrahim Khan Gauri, pen name Ashk
