= Mirian II =

King of Iberia
- Reign: BC 30–20
- Predecessor: Pharnavaz II
- Successor: Artaxias II
- Dynasty: Pharnavazid dynasty
- Father: Pharnajom

Mirian II (Georgian: მირიანი) or Mirvan (მირვანი) (c. 90–20 BC) was a king (mepe) of Iberia (Kartli, eastern Georgia) from 30 to 20 BC. His reign marked the reinstatement of the Nimrodid Dynasty, a continuation of the P'arnabazids.

Mirian is known solely from the early medieval Georgian chronicles according to which he was the son of king P'arnajom murdered by his son-in-law, the Armenian Artaxiad prince Artaxias I of Iberia who usurped the crown of Iberia. Mirian was carried to Parthia, there to be brought up at the court. He returned with a Parthian army, killed Arshak's reigning grandson Bartom in battle and became king. He was succeeded by his son, Arshak II.

Preceded by Parnavaz II (Bartom)	King of Iberia; 30–20 BC	Succeeded by Arshak II
