= Artavasdes I =

Artavasdes I may refer to:

- Artavasdes I of Armenia (died 115 BC), King of Armenia
- Artavasdes I of Media Atropatene, King of Media Atropatene and of Sophene in the latter half of the 1st century BC
