= Asparukh (name) =

- Gender: Male

Origin
- Origin: Iranian
- Meaning: Possessor of Shining Horses (aspa + rauk); Horse-souled (aspa + rah)

Asparukh is a Middle Iranian male name, attested in ancient Georgia and early medieval Bulgaria. It is a compound with the two elements: "aspa" (horse) and "rauk" (shine), meaning "he who has shining horses". Some other researchers claim that the name is derived from "aspa" (horse) and "rah" (soul), meaning "one with a soul of a horse".

The two historically attested persons bearing this name are:

- Asparukh of Iberia, a viceroy of Armazi in Iberia (Georgia), contemporary of the Roman emperor Hadrian (117–138 AD).
- Asparukh of Bulgaria, founder of the First Bulgarian Empire in the 680s.
