= Armazi =

Ancient Georgian city

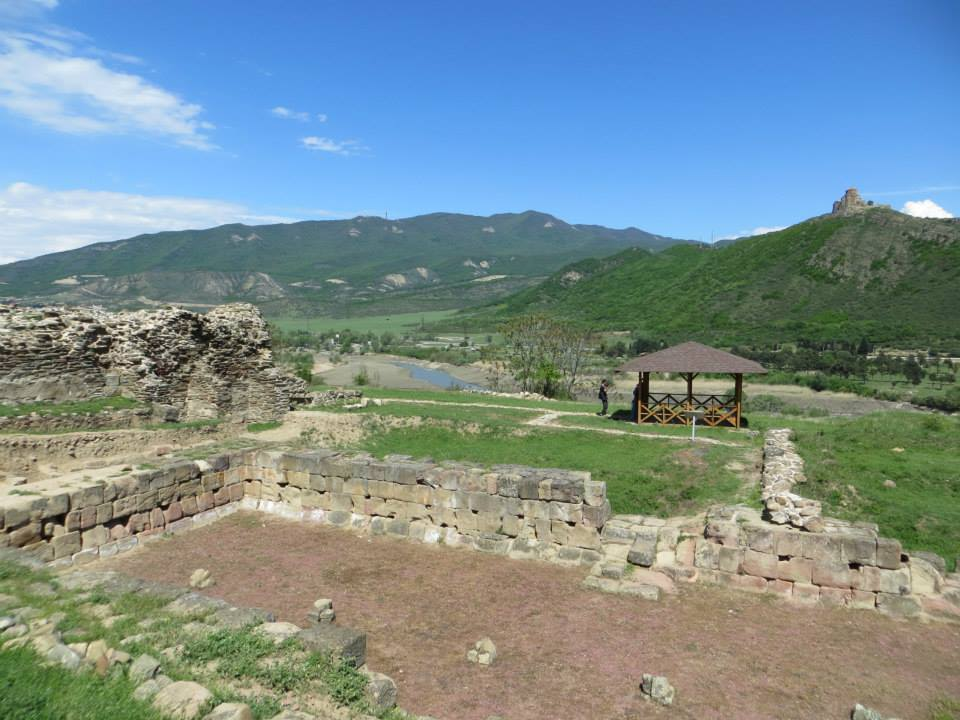
- The ruins of a six-column hall in the Armazi palace on Mount Bagineti (1st century BC).

- Location within Georgia
- 41°49′N 44°40′E
- Type: Settlement
- Location: Kartli, Georgia

Site notes
- Condition: In ruins

Armazi (Georgian: არმაზი) is a locale in Georgia, 4 km southwest of Mtskheta and 22 km northwest of Tbilisi. A part of historical Greater Mtskheta, it is a place where the ancient city of the same name and the original capital of the early Georgian kingdom of Kartli or Iberia was located. It particularly flourished in the early centuries AD and was destroyed by the Arab invasion in the 730s.

== Archaeology ==
Minor excavations on the territory of Armazi carried out in 1890 revealed the plinth of adobe town walls, with stone steps, and cleared the two-room structure, where fragments of a woman's torso of the 1st century AD were discovered. From 1943 to 1948 large-scale excavation was undertaken under Andria Apakidze of the Georgian Academy of Sciences, resumed in 1985 and continuing. These have shown that the adobe town walls and towers, built upon a plinth of hewn stone in the first half of the 1st century AD, surrounded the hill top and the side sloping down towards the river, an area of 30 ha. The land within the walls was terraced and various buildings were sited on the terraces.

The three major cultural layers have been identified: the earliest dates back to the 4th-3rd century BC (Armazi I), the middle one is from the 3rd-1st century BC (Armazi II), and the relatively newer structure belongs to the 1st-6th century AD (Armazi III). Armazi I is constructed of massive stone blocks forming an impregnable base but were finished off by less durable mud brick. It also contains a great hall of six columns with a tiled roof. Armazi II is noted for a temple with an apse. Armazi III is the richest layer constructed of elegantly cut stone blocks, joined together with lime mortar and metal clamps. Among the surviving structures are the royal palace, several richly decorated tombs, a bathhouse and a small stone mausoleum.

The area is now a state-protected field museum administered as a part of the National Archaeology Museum-Reserve of Greater Mtskheta.

== History ==
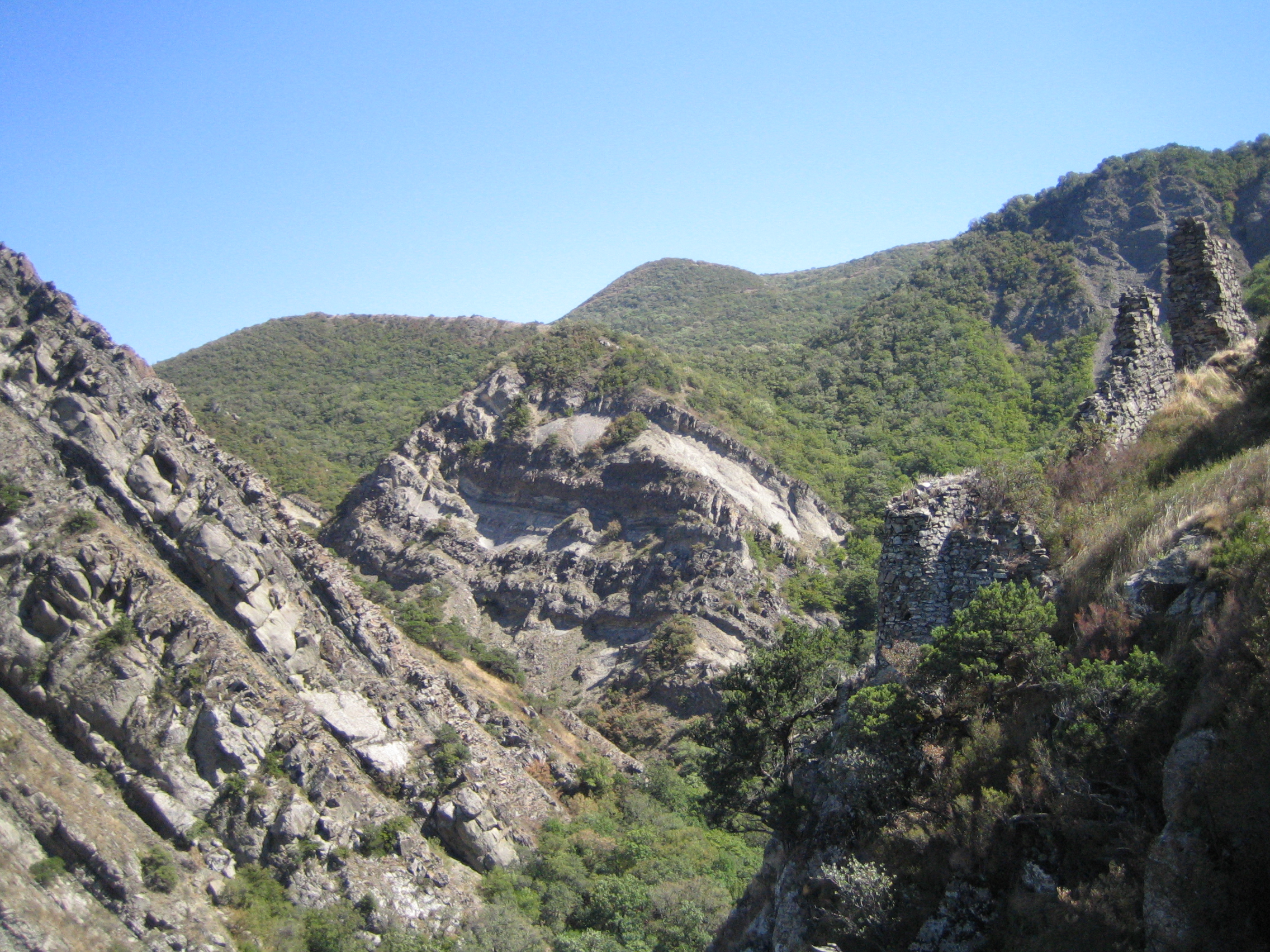
The ruins of the Armazi citadel

Archaeological evidences testify that the ancient Armazi was far more extensive than it is today. Armazi's strategic situation was dictated by its ready access to the Daryal Pass, the main road over the Greater Caucasus, through which the Scythians invaded the ancient Near East.

The name of the city and its dominant acropolis, Armaz-Tsikhe (literally, "citadel of Armazi"; არმაზციხე), is usually taken to derive from Armazi, the chief deity of the pagan Iberian pantheon. He was either a shortened form of Armazd or Ahur Mazda, the Zoroastrian God. Or he was derived from the Vedic God Armah which means the Moon God in Sanskrit. The latter is thought to be the correct one because of the findings of moon god relics. The name first appears in the early medieval Georgian annals though it is clearly much older and reflected in the Classical name Armastica or Harmozica of Strabo, Pliny, Ptolemy and Dio Cassius. According to a collection of medieval Georgian chronicles, Armaztsikhe was founded, in the 3rd century BC, by king Pharnavaz I of Iberia at the place hitherto known as Kartli. This fortress stood on the modern-day Mount Bagineti, on the right bank of the Mtkvari River (Kura), at its confluence with the Aragvi. The other citadel, Tsitsamuri (წიწამური) or Sevsamora of the Classical authors, stood just opposite, on the left bank of the Aragvi and controlled the road towards Mount Kazbek.

Even after the rise of Mtskheta as a capital of Iberia, Armazi remained the holy city of Iberian paganism and one of the defenses of Mtskheta. The fortress was captured by the Roman general Pompey during his 65 BC campaign against the Iberian king Artag. A ruined structure over the Mtkvari River dates from that time and is still called "Pompey's bridge". Armazi's heyday came when Iberia was allied with the Roman emperors. Armazi stele of Vespasian unearthed in 1867 reports that the Roman Emperor Vespasian fortified Armazi for the Iberian king Mithridates I in 75 AD. This defense wall constructed in a unique position to block the southern exit of the Daryal Pass before it widens into the plain of modern Tbilisi was presumably a preventive measure against the Alans who frequently raided the Roman frontiers from across the Caucasus.

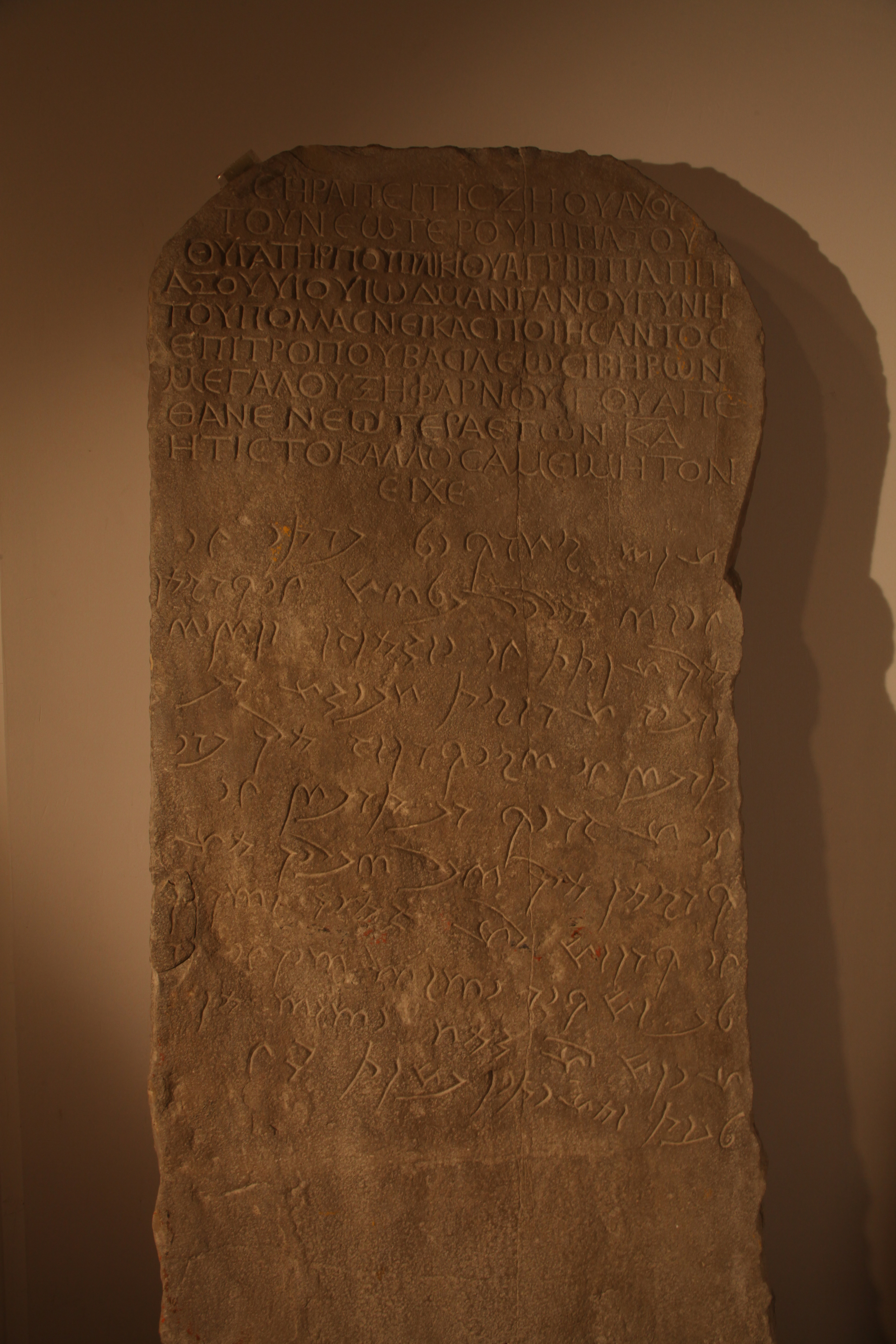
Stele of Serapeitis.

During this period, Armazi was governed by a hereditary pitiakhsh, whose rank approximated to that of viceroy or satrap, and was second in the official Iberian hierarchy after the king. The excavations of the hereditary necropolis of this dynasty yielded engraved gems bearing portraits of two of these viceroys, Asparukh (probably the contemporary of the Roman emperor Hadrian, 117-138 AD) and Zevakh (fl. 150 AD), a rare example of authentic, pre-Christian Georgian portraiture. Aramaic inscriptions from Armazi mention also the royal architect and the epitropos ("Lord Chamberlain").

Armazi played a central role in ancient Georgian cultural life and in the evolution of local epigraphy in Georgia, prior to the invention of the Georgian alphabet in the 5th century. Among a number of curious inscriptions found at Armazi, the most important is the bilingual Greco-Aramaic tombstone inscription commemorating the short-lived Serapita and her noble lineage. It contains an unusual, in its ductus and some of its forms, version of the Aramaic alphabet which came to be known as the "Armazi script" although it can also be found outside Armazi, in other parts of Georgia.

With the transfer of the Georgian capital to Tbilisi in the late 5th or early 6th century, Armazi went into a gradual decline. It still had its own high-ranking commandant, a post held in A.D. 545 by a certain Wistam. The city was finally destroyed and razed to the ground in 736 by the Arab commander Marwan ibn Muhammad (the future Umayyad Caliph Marwan II).

The city of Armazi has never been revived since then, but a Georgian Orthodox monastery of St. Nino was constructed there between 1150 and 1178. This is a six-apse hall church which, as well as its associated structures, is now largely in ruins and only some fragments of the 12th-century murals have survived.

== See also ==
- Dzalisi
