= Parnavaz =

Parnavaz may refer to:

- Parnavaz I of Iberia
- Parnavaz II of Iberia
