= Artaxiad dynasty of Iberia =

Armenian dynasty which ruled Iberia (ancient Georgia) from c. 90 BC to 30 BC

The Artaxiads (Georgian: არტაშესიანი, romanized: art'ashesiani), a branch of the eponymous dynasty of Armenia, ruled Iberia (ancient Georgia) from c. 90 BC to 30 BC. According to the medieval Georgian chronicles, they acquired the crown of Iberia after the Iberian nobles revolted against their king P’arnajom, of the Pharnabazid dynasty, and petitioned the king of Armenia to send his son, who was married to a Pharnabazid princess, as their new monarch. Both the king of Armenia and his son are referred to in the chronicles as “Arshak”, probably a confusion with Artaxias which seems to be taken as a general term about the Artaxiad kings of Armenia. Professor Cyril Toumanoff identifies the king of Armenia of this account as Artavasdes I (ruled c. 159 BC - c. 115 BC) and considers the newly installed Iberian king, Artaxias I (ruled 90–78 BC), to have been his son. The chronicle goes on to describe a great battle between a combined Iberian-Armenian army against P’arnajom and his followers. In the end, P’arnajom was defeated and killed, and thereafter the Armenian prince was the king of Iberia.

Little is known about the early years of the Iberian Artaxiad rule. They seem to have been under the influence of their Armenian cousins to whom Iberia had relinquished a significant portion of its territory. This association with the Armenian Artaxiads, who were at their peak of power during the reign of Tigranes the Great (r. 95–55 BC), brought about Iberia's involvement in the Third Mithridatic War between the Pontus-Armenian alliance and Rome (75–65 BC). Plutarch and Licinius Macer state that Iberian contingents featured prominently in the battles of Tigranocerta (69 BC) and Artaxata (68 BC). Even after the surrender of Tigranes to the mercy of Pompey, the Artaxiad king of Iberia Artoces (r. 78–63 BC) continued to offer a stubborn resistance to the invading Romans, but was eventually defeated and forced to plead for peace. This Artoces well known to the Classical sources is apparently the Artag (Artog), son of Arshak/Artaxias, of the Georgian annals which surprisingly omit any mention of the Roman invasion, but instead report the king's fighting with the “Persians”.

Roman hegemony over Iberia proved to be impermanent, however, and, in 36 BC, the legate Publius Canidius Crassus had to lead his army into Iberia to force its king Pharnabazus into a new alliance with Rome. Neither Pharnabazus nor his relations with Rome are recorded in the Georgian chronicles whose narrative focuses on King Bartom, son of Artag, and his demise in the struggle with the once-exiled prince Mirian who eventually restored the Pharnabazid dynasty to the throne of Iberia. Modern scholars tend to identify Pharnabazus with Bartom and consider him the last in the Artaxiad line.

== Artaxiad kings of Iberia ==
- Artaxias I of Iberia, 90-78 BC
- Artoces (son), 78-63 BC
- Pharnavaz II (son), 63-30 BC
