= Arshak =

Arshak (or in Western Armenian Arshag) (in Persian آرشاک) (in Armenian Արշակ) is a Persian and Armenian given name.

== People ==
=== Historic ===
- Artaxiad dynasty of Iberia, a branch of the eponymous dynasty of Armenia, ruled Iberia (ancient Georgia) from c. 90 BC to 30 AD.
  - Arshak I of Iberia, also known as Artaxias I of Iberia, king of Artaxiad dynasty, king of Iberia (modern-day Georgia) from 90 to 78 BC. He is known exclusively from the medieval Georgian chronicles which gives his name as Arshak
  - Arshak II of Iberia, also known as Artaxias II of Iberia, or Arsuk (died in AD 1), king of the Nimrodid Dynasty, king of Iberia (present Georgia) from c. 20 BC to AD 1.
- Arshakuni Dynasty or Arsacid dynasty of Armenia, ruled the Kingdom of Armenia from 54 to 428.
  - Arshak I of Armenia or Arsaces I of Armenia, king of Armenia, also known as Arsaces I, Arshak I and Arsak (flourished 1st century) (assassinated in 35 AD), a Parthian Prince of Iranian and Greek ancestry who served as a Roman Client King of Armenia in 35.
  - Arshak II (fl. 4th century, died 369 or 370), also known as Arsaces II and Arsak II, Armenian king, a prince who was a Roman client king of Arsacid Armenia from 350 until 368
  - Arshak III (fl. 4th century – died 387), also known as Arsaces III, Arsak III and Arshak III-Vagharshak, Armenian king, and prince who served as a Roman client king of Arsacid Armenia from 378 until 387.
  - Arsaces (son of Khosrov IV of Armenia), also known as Arshak, an Armenian Prince of the Arsacid dynasty of Armenia who lived in the second half of the 4th century and possibly first half of the 5th century.

=== Contemporary people ===
==== Arshak ====
- Arshak Adamian (1884–1956), Armenian conductor, composer, art critic, pedagogue
- Arshak Amiryan (born 1977), Armenian footballer
- Arshak Fetvadjian (1866–1947), Ottoman-born Armenian artist, painter and designer
- Arshak Gafavian better known by his nom de guerre Keri (1858–1916), Armenian fedayee military commander in the Ottoman Empire
- Arshak Hayrapetyan (born 1978), Armenian freestyle wrestler
- Arshak Jamalyan or Djamalian (1882–1940), Armenian politician and minister during First Republic of Armenia
- Arshak Koryan (born 1995), Russian Armenian footballer
- Arshak Petrosian (born 1953), Armenian chess player and coach
- Arshak Sarkissian (born 1981), Armenian painter
- Arshak Ter-Gukasov (1819–1881), Armenian Lieutenant-General of the Russian Empire
- Arshak Vramian (1871–1915), Ottoman Armenian politician, member of the Ottoman parliament elected from Van Province, Ottoman Empire. He was killed just before the Siege of Van.

==== Arshag ====
- Arshag Chobanian (1872–1954), Ottoman born Armenian short story writer, journalist, editor, poet, translator, literary critic, playwright, philologist, and novelist
- Arshag Karagheusian (1872–1963), Armenian rug manufacturer, co-owner of A & M Karagheusian
- Arshag Nersesian (1872–1940) better known by the pseudonym Sebouh, Armenian general who was the right-hand man of General Andranik Ozanian

== See also ==
- Arsaces, classical Latinised alternative of the Armenian name Arshak
- Alternative name of Asaak, an ancient city which was a capital of the Parthian Empire
- Arshakid Mausoleum, or Tomb of the Arshakid Kings or Arshakuni Tomb, a grave monument complex that sits along a gorge overlooking the Amberd River, and is located in the center of the village of Aghtsk in the Aragatsotn Province of Armenia
- Arshak II (opera), first Armenian classical opera, written by Dikran Tchouhadjian and T. Terzian
- TCA Arshag Dickranian Armenian School, private Armenian school in Hollywood, California
- Arash, common Iranian first name
