= Artaxias II of Iberia =

Artaxias II

King of Iberia
- Reign: 20 BC – AD 1
- Predecessor: Mirian II
- Successor: Pharasmanes I
- Dynasty: Pharnavazid dynasty

Artaxias II (Georgian: არშაკ) or Arsuk (არსუკ) (died in 1 AD), was a member of the Nimrodid Dynasty and was a king (mepe) of Iberia (Kartli, eastern Georgia) from c. 20 BC to 1 AD.

According to a legendary account from the medieval Georgian annals, he was a descendant of Nimrod and Parnavaz through his father, Mirian II, and was a member of the Arshakuniani dynasty through his mother. Arsuk has to deal with the return of the exiled Pharnabazid prince Aderki (son of Kartam, adopted son of Bratman). In an ensuing battle between the two, Aderki emerged victorious and became king.

Preceded by Mirian II	King of Iberia c. 20 BC – 1 AD	Succeeded by Pharasmanes I (Aderki)
