= Caucasian campaign of Pompey =

Part of Pompey's eastern campaigns

- Part of the Third Mithridatic War
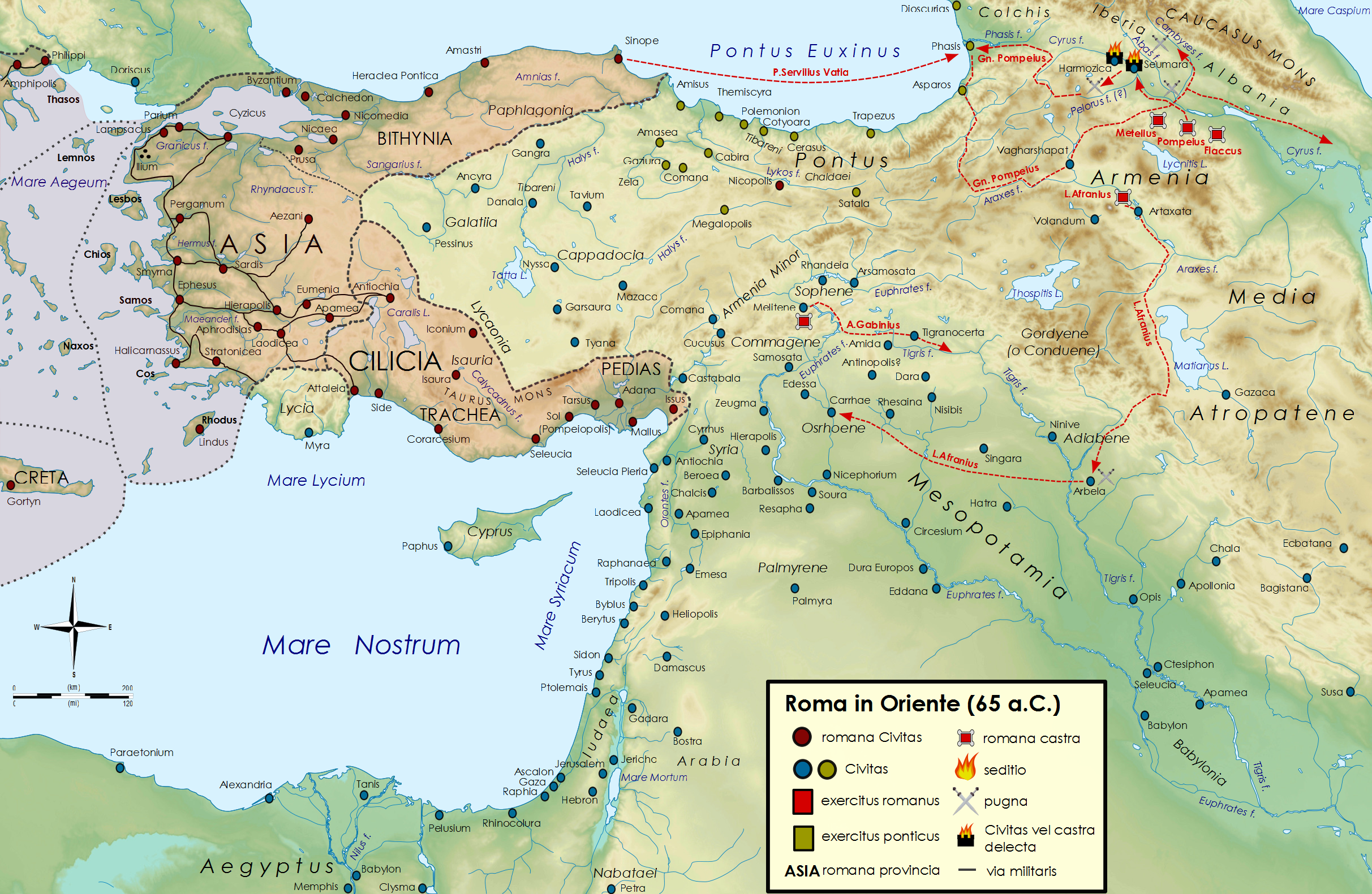
- Pompey's campaign in the East 65 BC
Date	65 BC
Location	Caucasus, eastern Anatolia
Result	Roman victory
Territorial changes	Incorporation of Colchis

Belligerents
Roman Republic	Kingdom of Themiscyra; Kingdom of Iberia; Caucasian Albania

Commanders and leaders
Pompey	Artoces

Caucasian campaign of Pompey (Georgian: პომპეუსის ლაშქრობა კავკასიაში) was a military campaign led by Pompey that took place in 65 BC and was a consequence of the third Mithridatic War fought over Georgian lands and its neighboring frontiers. Rome sought to expand its influence and establish itself as the overlord of the Middle East. After conquering the Kingdom of Pontus and receiving the subjugation of Tigranes II of Armenia the Romans marched on the Kingdom of Iberia, whose king, Artoces had been an ally of Mithridates VI of Pontus, Rome's premier enemy during the 80s, 70s, and early 60s BC.

== Background ==
The war against Mithridates VI, king of Pontus, had now lasted for almost twenty-five years (since 89 BC). Both Lucius Cornelius Sulla Felix and Lucius Licinius Lucullus had fought against him, achieving numerous successes. However, Lucullus' fortune and consensus among his troops had been wavering for too long, so much so that certain complaints about the recent military campaigns conducted in the East, without prior support from the Senate, also reached Rome, where it was decided to replace the Roman proconsul in command of his province, and to send a large part of his soldiers on leave. Lucullus thus found himself exonerated, for having dissatisfied not only his troops, but also for having antagonized the powerful faction of usurers and tax collectors in Asia.

Meanwhile, Tigranes had retreated within his kingdom, reconquering some previously lost parts. while Mithridates also hastened to reconquer part of the ancient territories of Pontus and Lesser Armenia. Lucullus, who had initially attempted to follow him, was forced to turn back due to lack of supplies.

Then it was Mithridates who counterattacked the Romans, even managing to kill many of them in battle. First he went against a legate of Lucullus, named Fabius, who was almost massacred together with his army, if during the battle Mithridates had not been hit by a stone on the knee and by a dart under his eye, forcing the king himself to move away from the battlefield and suspend the fighting, thus allowing Fabius and the Romans to save themselves. Then Fabius was closed and besieged in Cabira and freed only thanks to the intervention of a second legate, Gaius Valerius Triarius, who happened to be in those parts on his march from Asia towards Lucullus.

Therefore, it was the turn of Lucullus' second legate, Triarius, who had come to the aid of Fabius with his army. Triarius, determined to pursue Mithridates, managed to beat the sovereign of Pontus during this first clash, near Comana. Then came winter, which interrupted all military operations on both sides.

Once the winter had passed, Mithridates clashed with Triarius again, going to camp near Gaziura in front of the Roman legate. Mithridates tried to lure the Roman legate into battle and in the end Triarius fell into his trap and was heavily defeated near Zela. Having obtained these two victories, Mithridates retreated to the country that the Romans called little Armenia (on the hills near Talauro), destroying everything that he was not able to transport, in order to avoid being reached by Lucullus in his march. Then Mithridates decided to invade Cappadocia again, managing to conquer almost all of its old dominions. He then proceeded to fortify his kingdom and damaged nearby Cappadocia, while the Romans did nothing, either because they were busy against the pirates of the Mediterranean, or because neither Acilius, nor Lucullus (by now ousted from command), nor Marcius ( new governor of Cilicia), took no action against him.

While Lucullus was occupied with Mithridates and Tigranes II, Gnaeus Pompey managed to cleanse the entire Mediterranean basin from pirates, wresting from them the island of Crete, the coasts of Lycia, Pamphylia, and Cilicia, demonstrating extraordinary discipline and organizational ability (in 67 BC). Cilicia proper (Trachea and Pedias), which had been a pirate den for over forty years, was thus definitively subjugated. Following these events the city of Tarsus became the capital of the entire Roman province. As many as 39 new cities were then founded. The speed of the campaign indicated that Pompey had been talented as a general at sea, with strong logistical skills.

Pompey was then tasked with conducting a new war against Mithridates VI, king of Pontus, in the East (in 66 BC), thanks to the lex Manilia, proposed by the plebeian tribune Gaius Manilius, and politically supported by Caesar and Cicero. This command essentially entrusted him with the conquest and reorganization of the entire eastern Mediterranean, having the power to proclaim which were the client peoples and which were the enemies, with an unlimited power never before conferred on anyone, and attributing to him all the forces military forces beyond the borders of Roman Italy.

Pompey, having understood that it was necessary to continue the war against Mithriadates, made the necessary preparations, recalling the Valerian legion into service. Having arrived in Galatia, coming from the south after crossing the "gates of Cilicia", he met Lucullus on the way back. Meanwhile, Mithridates, since he initially had fewer armed men than Pompey, began to plunder, forcing Pompey to run after him, as well as trying in every way to block his supplies. The king of Pontus, who still had an army of 30,000 infantr and 2,000/3,000 cavalry, had positioned himself along the frontier of his kingdom, and since Lucullus had shortly before devastated that region, there were few supply resources so much so that many of its armed forces were forced to desert. The king, then, being now short of supplies, preferred to withdraw, allowing Pompey to follow him, albeit letting him enter his territories, and thus hoping that the Roman general himself could find himself in the same conditions as him due to the scarcity of supplies. But Pompey had adequately organized his supplies (also building a series of water wells), having conquered the Armenian region of Anaitide shortly before.

Pompey was thus able to continue his march passing through the eastern borders of Mithridates' kingdom, establishing a series of new fortified positions (at regular intervals of 25 km from each other). He therefore designed a circumvallation line that would allow him to besiege the king of Pontus and obtain supplies without major difficulties.

The Roman general Lucullus had led the eastern campaign from 73 BC to 67 BC but after a mutiny of his army he had retreated to Galatia in Asia Minor. In 66 BC, the Roman Senate gave command of the war against Mithridates to Gnaeus Pompeius (better known as Pompey). That same year Pompey effectively defeated Mithridates at the Battle of the Lycus, with the king escaping through Colchis to the Bosporean kingdom north of the Black Sea. A pursuit party was sent after him, they followed him all the way to Colchis but lost his trail. Pompey meanwhile prepared to advance into Armenia against his second enemy, Tigranes II the Great king of the Armenian empire. When he did Tigranes submitted and was allowed to keep Armenia, but not those lands he had won by conquest (parts of Cappadocia, Cilicia, Syria, Phoenicia, and Sophene). Pompey left Armenia under the military supervision of Afranius, he sent Gabinius south-east towards Mesopotamia and he himself marched the main army north (into the valley of the river Cyrnus) towards the Kingdom of Albania. Here he split his troops into three divisions and put them into winter quarters.

== First campaign ==
The Caucasian Albani decided to act before the Romans could invade. Oroeses, king of the Albani, organized a concerted attack on the divided Roman forces. The attacks were to coincide with the Roman feast of Saturnalia to maximize their success. Unfortunately, the capably led veteran Roman forces were more than a match for the Albani tribesmen and their attacks were easily repulsed. Oroeses was forced to submit to terms. Pompey then made preparations for the subjugation of both the Albanian and Iberian kingdoms. Fearing imminent invasion Artoces (probably the Artag of Georgian history) king of the Iberians turned to diplomacy and promised the Romans unconditional friendship. Pompey accepted the terms but because he was alerted by his intelligence service that the Iberians were secretly planning an attack, in the spring of 65 BC he marched his forces into Iberia. Artoces, who was still preparing for his surprise attack on the Romans, was caught off guard.

Pompey's forces quickly captured the pass into Iberia and seized the fortress of Harmozike. Artoces panicked and fled, he took shelter on the left bank of Kura river. He burned the bridge to ensure that the Romans could not cross the river. Pompey subjugated the right bank. Artoces requested a truce promising the Romans that he would restore the bridge and supply them with food. Artoces stayed true to his words but upon restoring the bridge, Pompey crossed it with his forces in an attempt to seize the king.

Artoces withdrew to the Aragvi River and burned a bridge in the same manner. Some of the Iberian militants hid in the woods and fought the Roman forces like partisans, shooting down arrows from the trees, killing any passing Roman soldiers. Reportedly, a sizeable number of women also participated in this irregular warfare. They were defeated when Pompey's forces cut down some of the forest and then burned the rest to the ground.

Pompey pursued Artoces into the center of Iberia and brought him to battle near the river Pelorus. Artoces main strength lay in his archers, but, using tactics reminiscent of the Athenians at the Battle of Marathon, Pompey disabled them by means of a rapid infantry charge, which brought his legionaries to close quarters before the enemy fire could take effect. Greek historian Plutarch called this battle a great battle and noted that Iberian casualties consisted of approximately 9,000 people, while more than 10,000 were taken captive by the Romans.

The Iberians finally lost the war, and their king was forced to turn to diplomacy once more. He sent invaluable objects made of gold to Pompey and asked for a truce. Pompey demanded Artoces's children as hostages and, as the king was taking too much time to think it over, led his soldiers to Aragvi and crossed it so that he left Artoces no choice. He submitted, gave his children as hostages and signed the peace with the Romans. The Kingdom of Iberia was to be a friend and ally of the Roman Republic and accepted the terms of vassalage.

After subduing Iberia, Pompey headed towards the small kingdom of Colchis and subjugated its main stronghold and various local peoples on the way through both cunning diplomacy and the use of force. He met up with the admiral Servilius and his fleet in Phasis and commanded them to blockade Mithridates who was still in his Bosporean kingdom, while he returned to Albania to quell a revolt. Pompey gave the rule of Colchis to Aristarchus, effectively making it a Roman province, part of Bithynia et Pontus.

== Second campaign ==
Pompey's line of march took him south of Iberia, where he no doubt feared serious hindrance from the inhabitants and a shortage of supplies due to the foraging of the previous campaign, and involved a hazardous crossing of the Cyrnus into Albania. Here he used his horses and pack animals as a sort of breakwater to shield his infantry from the full force of the current. The crossing was followed by a long march through rugged desert terrain in pursuit of the Albanian army, a march made all the more difficult by unreliable guides and the fact that many of his soldiers fell ill after drinking too deeply of the chilly waters of the river Cambyses. This led Pompey to take more care over the provision of water and for the next stage of march 10,000 water skins were procured and used.

The Albani were finally caught at the river Abas where a decisive battle was fought. Strabo gives their numbers at 60,000 foot and 22,000 horse with Plutarch giving the same infantry but 12,000 horse, but this must be an exaggeration, since Dio says that Pompey was at pains to disguise his own numerical superiority in order to induce Oroeses to attack. He achieved this by placing his cavalry in front of his infantry and instructed his legionaries to keep out of sight by kneeling and covering up their helmets. It worked, the Albani thought they were just facing his cavalry and charged. The infantry rose, the Roman horse retreated through the infantry lines and then the legionaries broke the Albani charge. According to one account Pompey entered the melee himself and fought King Oroeses brother and slew him. The trap was closed by the cavalry which had wheeled left and right, rode around the back of their own lines, and came round to attack the Albani in the rear. The Albani were decisively defeated.

The victory finally put an end to any threat of armed resistance in the north-east. Many of the tribes of the Caucasus and Caspian sent envoys to conclude peace with Rome.
