= Artsakh =

Artsakh may refer to:

== Places ==
- Artsakh (historical province), in the ancient Kingdom of Armenia
- Kingdom of Artsakh, a medieval Armenian Kingdom
- Nagorno-Karabakh, region in the South Caucasus, also known as Artsakh
- Republic of Artsakh, a breakaway state in the South Caucasus which existed from 1991 to 2023
- Republic of Artsakh (government in exile), the form of the Republic of Artsakh that has persisted past 2023

== Other uses ==
- "Artsakh" (song), a 1999 instrumental folk song by Armenian composer Ara Gevorgyan
- "Artsakh", a single by Armenian American composer and singer Serj Tankian

== See also ==
- Arsak (disambiguation)
- Karabakh (disambiguation)
