= Hypocaust =

Ancient Roman system of underfloor heating

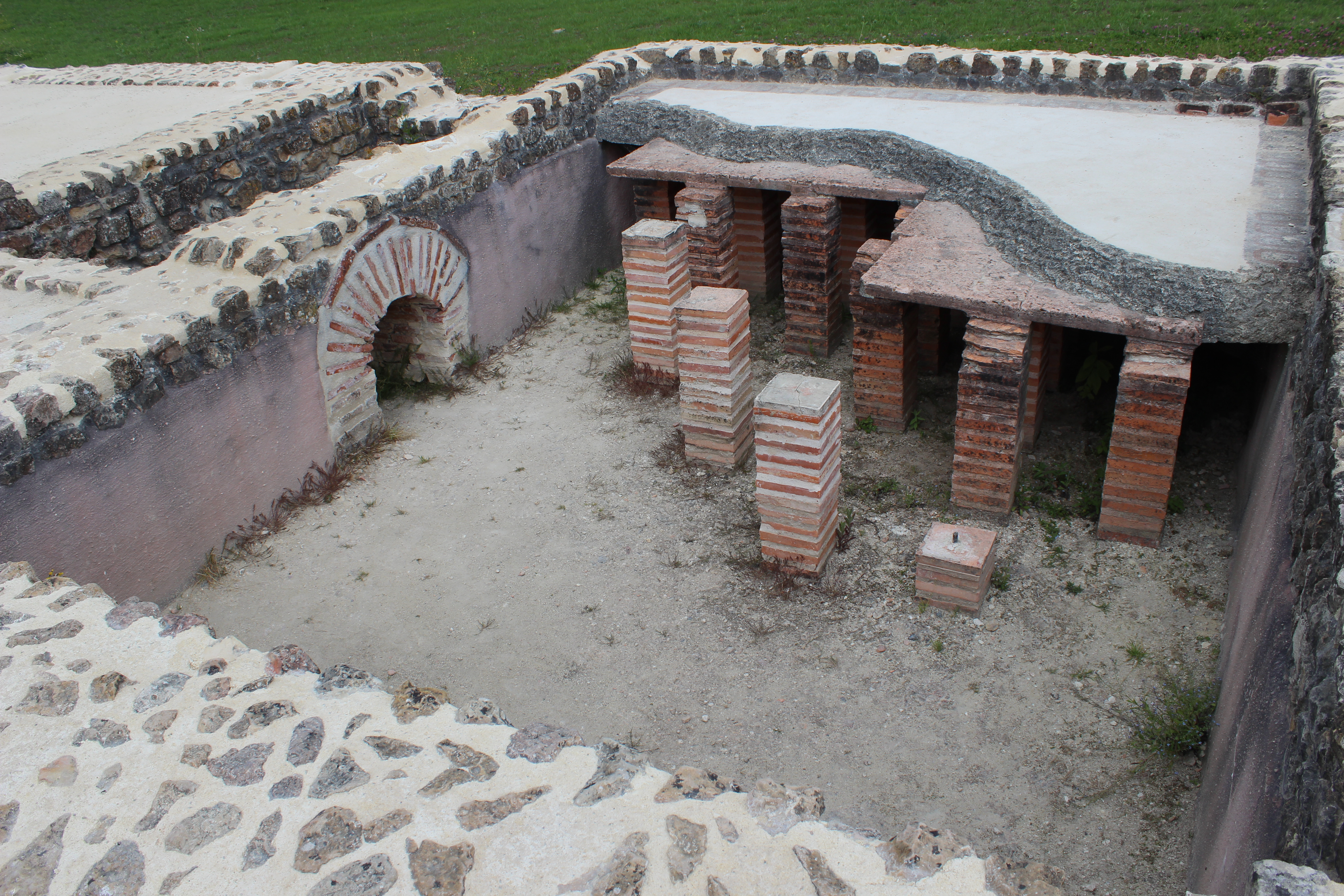
Hypocaust under the floor in a Roman villa in Vieux-la-Romaine, near Caen, France

A hypocaust (Latin: hypocaustum) is a system of central heating in a building that produces and circulates hot air below the floor of a room, and may also warm the walls with a series of pipes through which the hot air passes. This air can warm the upper floors as well. The word derives from Ancient Greek hupó 'under' and kaustós 'burnt' (compare caustic). The earliest reference to such a system suggests that the Temple of Ephesus in 350 BC was heated in this manner, although Vitruvius attributes its invention to Sergius Orata c. 80 BC. Its invention improved the hygiene and living conditions of citizens, and was a forerunner of modern central heating.

== Roman operation ==
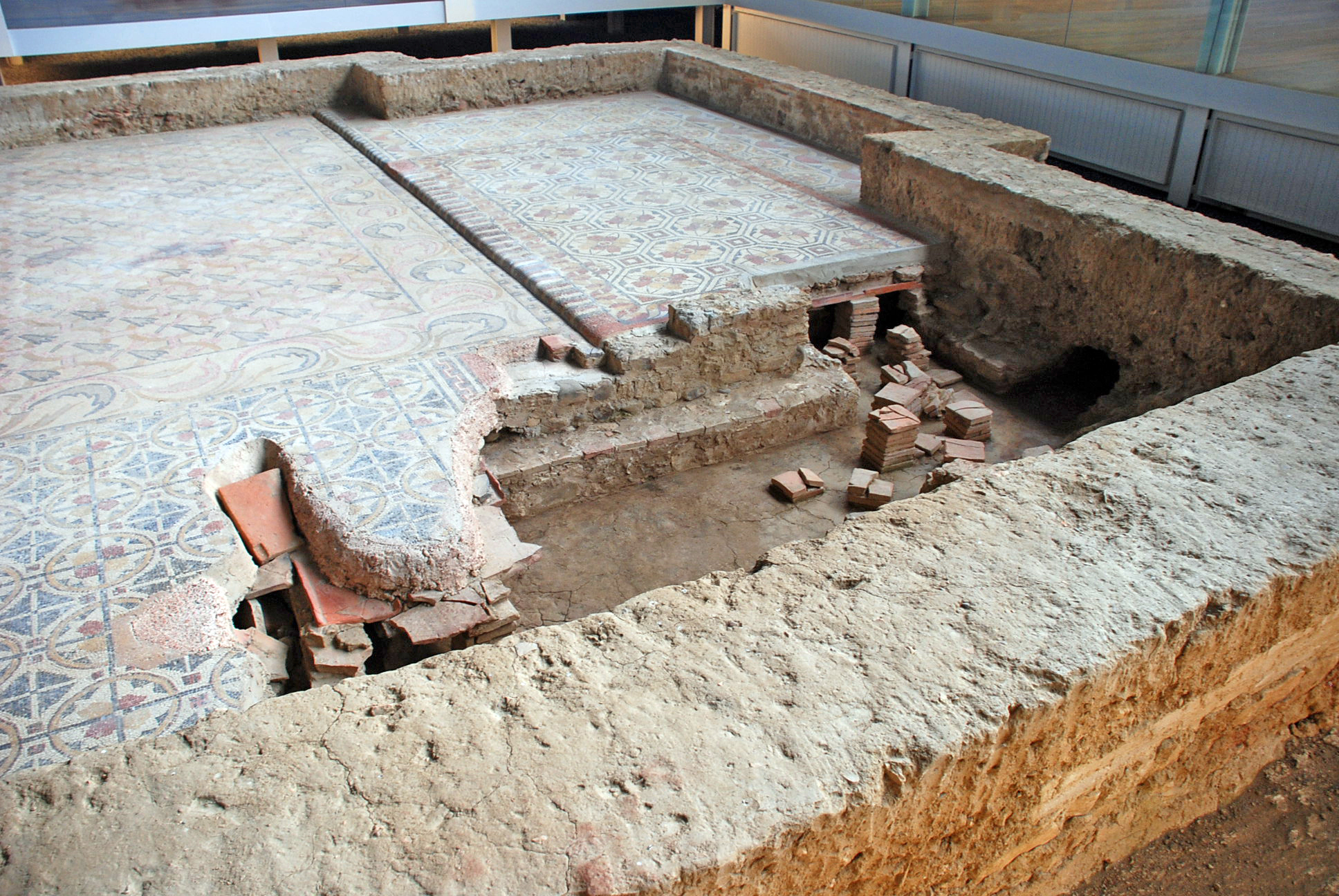
Ruins of the hypocaust under the floor of a Roman villa at La Olmeda, Province of Palencia (Castile and León, Spain)

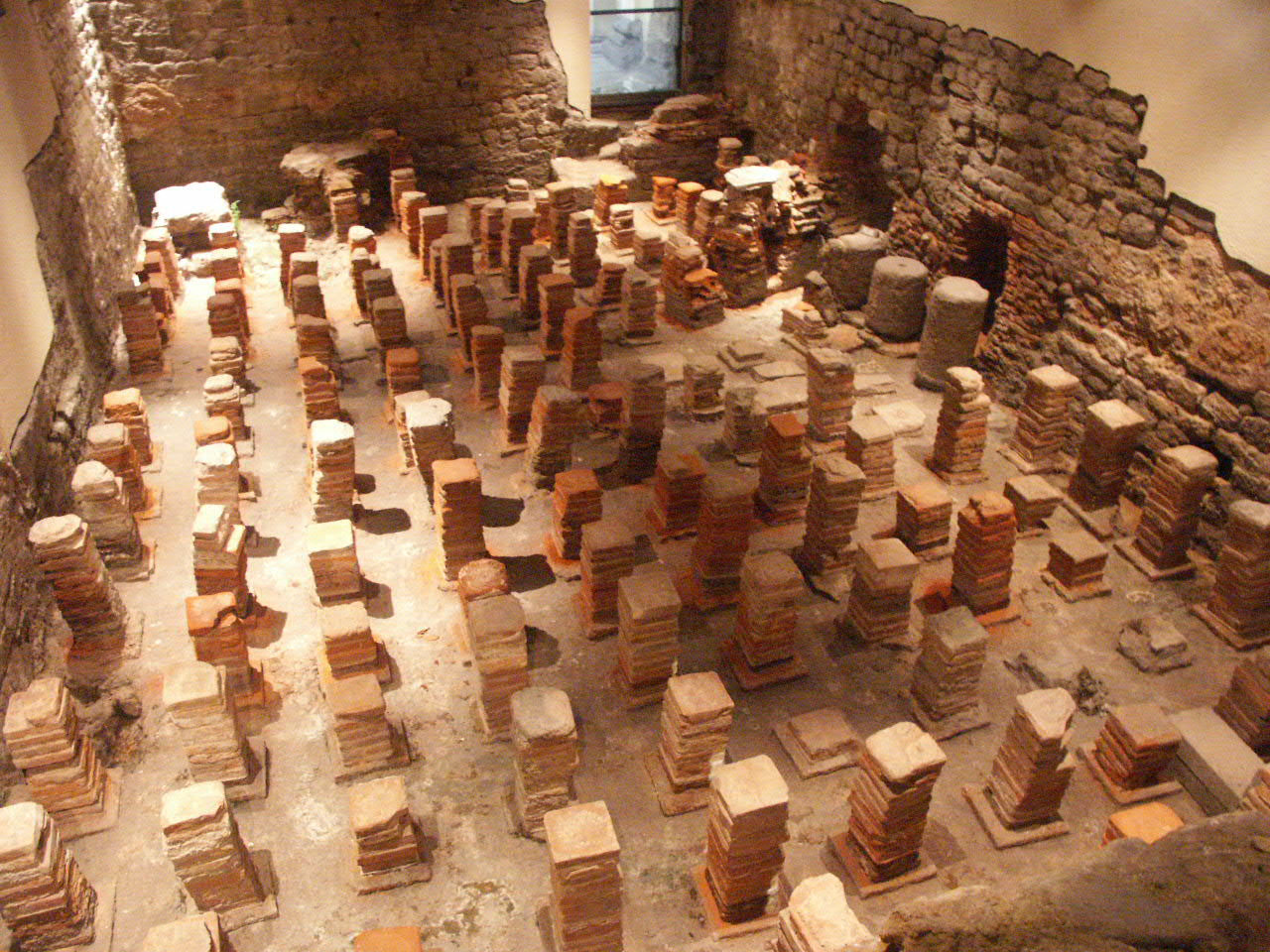
Caldarium from the Roman Baths at Bath, in Britain. The floor has been removed to reveal the empty spaces through which the hot air would flow.

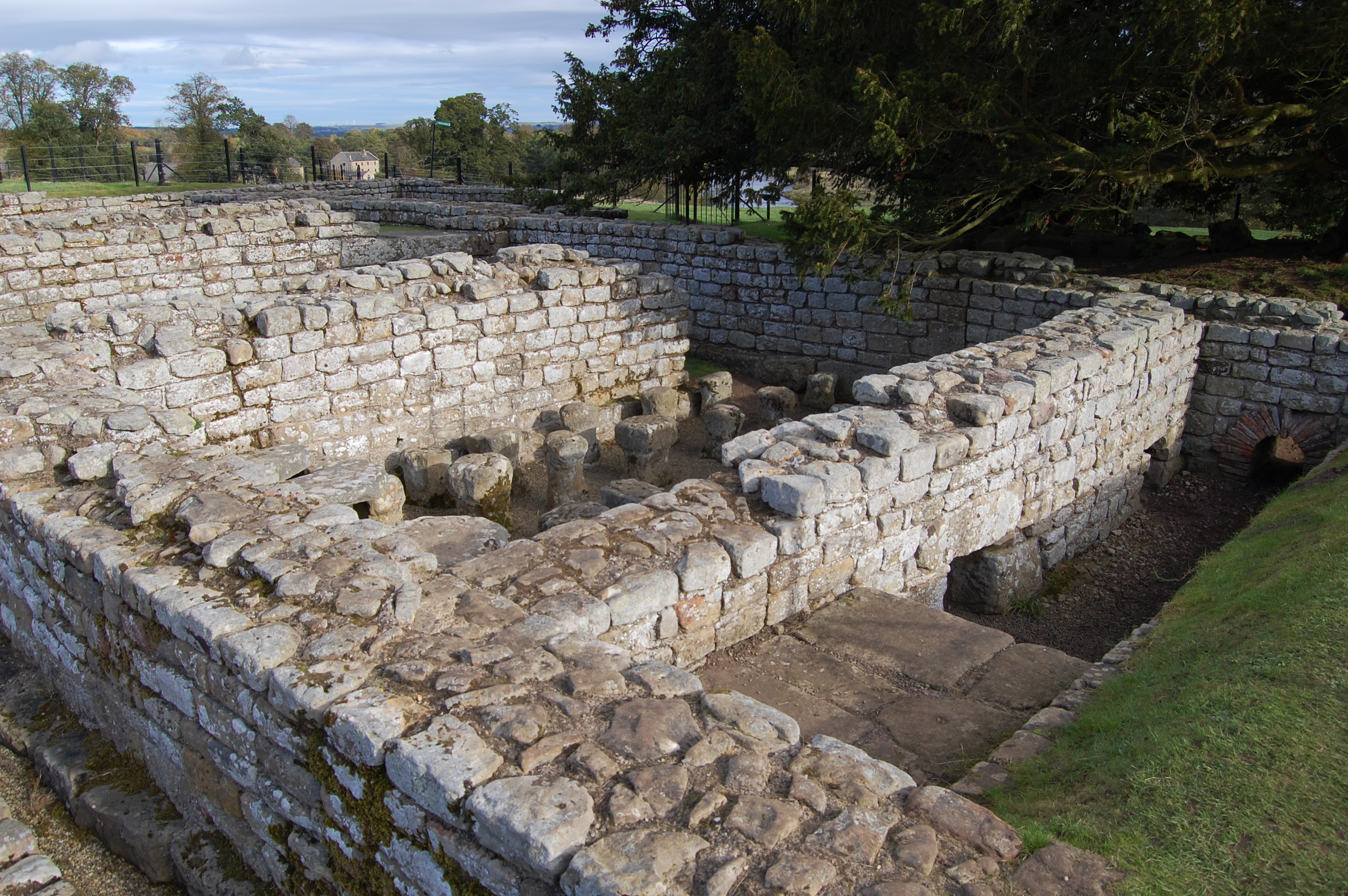
Hypocaust at Chesters Roman Fort

Hypocausts were used for heating hot baths and other public buildings in ancient Rome. They were also used in private homes. It was considered proper and necessary by the wealthier merchant class for their villas, throughout the Roman Empire. The ruins of Roman hypocausts have been found throughout Europe (for example in Italy, England, Spain, France, Switzerland, and Germany) and in Africa as well.

The floor of the hypocaust was raised above the ground by pillars, called pilae stacks. These stacks supported a layer of tiles, followed by a layer of concrete, then the floor tiles of the rooms above. Hot air and smoke from the furnace would circulate through this enclosed area and then up through clay or tile flues in the walls of the rooms above to outlets in the roof, thereby heating the floors and walls of the rooms above. These tile flues were referred to as caliducts.

Rooms intended to be the warmest were located nearest to the furnace below, the heat output of which was regulated by adjusting the amount of wood fed to the fire. It was expensive and labour-intensive to run a hypocaust, as it required constant attention to the fire and a lot of fuel, so it was a feature usually encountered only in large villas and public baths.

Vitruvius describes their construction and operation in his work De architectura in about 15 BC, including details about how fuel could be conserved by building the hot room (caldarium) for men next to that for women, with both adjacent to the tepidarium, so as to run the public baths efficiently. He also describes a device for adjusting the heat by a bronze ventilator in the domed ceiling.

Remains of many Roman hypocausts have survived throughout Europe, western Asia, and northern Africa.

== Non-Roman analogues ==
In 1984–1985, in the Georgian Soviet Socialist Republic, excavations in the ancient settlement of Dzalisi uncovered a large castle complex, featuring a well-preserved hypocaust built between 200 and 400 AD.

Korean houses have traditionally used ondol to provide floor heating on similar principles as the hypocaust, drawing smoke from a wood fire typically used for cooking. Ondol heating was common in South Korean homes until the 1960s, by which time dedicated ondol installations were typically used to warm the main room of the house, burning a variety of fuels such as coal and biomass.

On a smaller scale, in Northern China the kang bed-stove has a long history.

== After the Romans ==
With the decline of the Roman Empire, the hypocaust fell into disuse in the western provinces, but not in the Eastern Roman empire. It is thought that in Britain, from c. 400 until c. 1900, central heating did not exist, and hot baths were rare. However, an evolution of the hypocaust was used in some monasteries in calefactories, or warming rooms, which were heated via underground fires, as in the Roman hypocaust, but retained heat via granite stones. In Eastern Europe, the development of radiant ceramic or stone stoves were also used. In the Iberian Peninsula, the Roman system was adopted for the heating of Hispano-Islamic baths (hammams) of Al Andalus. A derivation of hypocaust, the gloria, was in use in Castile until the arrival of modern heating. After the fuel (mainly wood) was reduced to ashes, the air intake was closed to keep hot air inside and to slow combustion. In colonial British North America, the house of Maryland governor Charles Calvert (now part of the Historic Inns of Annapolis) was constructed in the 1720s with a hypocaust to heat a greenhouse for growing tropical plants.

== See also ==
- Ancient Roman engineering – Engineering accomplishments of the ancient Roman civilization
- Ancient Roman technology – Technological accomplishments of the ancient Roman civilization
- Cocklestove – Tile-covered masonry heater (Kachelofen)
- Masonry heater – Heating device
- Underfloor heating – Form of central heating and cooling
