= Dzalisi =

Coordinates: 41.9631°N 44.6021°E

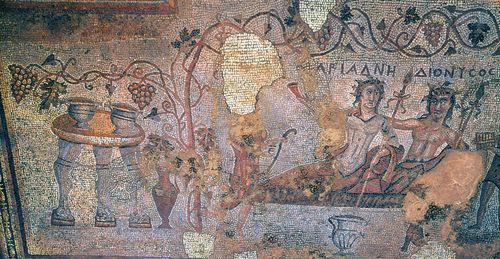
A mosaic from Dzalisi

Dzalisi (Georgian: ძალისი) is a historic village in Georgia, located in the Mukhrani valley, 50 km northwest of Tbilisi, and 20 km northwest of Mtskheta.

It is the Zalissa (Greek: Ζάλισσα) of Ptolemy (AD 90–168) who mentions it as one of principal towns of Iberia, an ancient Georgian kingdom (Geographia; § 10, 3). Archaeological digs have revealed the remains of four palaces and hypocaust baths, acropolis, swimming pool, administrative part, barracks for soldiers, water supply system and burial grounds. One of the villas is notable for its floor mosaics, which, together with the mosaics of Pityus, are, by far, the oldest ones found in the Caucasus. The style of the mosaic dates to around AD 300. Its central part depicts Ariadne and Dionysus in a banquet scene.
