= Artoces =

Artoces of Iberia

King of Iberia
- Reign: 78-63 BC
- Predecessor: Artaxias I
- Successor: Pharnavaz II
- Died: after 63 BC
- Issue: Pharnavaz II
- Dynasty: Artaxiad dynasty of Iberia
- Father: Artaxias I of Iberia
- Mother: sister of Pharnajom

Artoces was a king (mepe) of Iberia (Kartli, eastern Georgia) from 78 to 63 BC. He features in the Classical accounts of the Third Mithridatic War (Appian, Bell. Mithr. 103, 117; Cassius Dio 37.1-2; Eutropius 6.14 [Artaces]; Festus 16; Orosius 6.4.8) and is identified with the Artag (Georgian: არტაგ), Arik (არიკ), Rok (როკ), or Aderk (ადერკ), of the medieval Georgian annals.

According to the Georgian historic tradition, he was the son and successor of Artaxias I of the Artaxiads. The medieval Georgian account of his reign is brief and focuses on the devastation of his kingdom at the hands of Iranians while the Classical sources much closer to the period in question contain a detailed description of Artoces's war with Rome on the side of Mithridates VI of Pontus and Tigranes of Armenia.

Alarmed by the Roman occupation of the neighboring Albania, Artoces promised peace and friendship; but the Roman commander Pompey, informed that he was secretly arming so as to fall upon the Romans on their march in the passes of the Caucasus, advanced in March 65 BC, before resuming the pursuit of Mithridates, to the Iberian strongholds of Harmozica and Seusamora. Artoces, caught by surprise, hastily burnt the bridge over the Cyrus and retreated further in his forested country. Pompey occupied the fortresses and crossed the river, but met a fierce resistance by the Iberian army. Artokes had lost 9 000 dead and 10 000 captured in the fight. In the end, the Romans prevailed, and, when Artoces saw the Pelorus river, apparently the modern Aragvi, also crossed by Pompey, he surrendered, and sent his children as hostages.

Preceded by Artaxias I	King of Iberia; 78–63 BC	Succeeded by Pharnabazus II
