= Mount Bagineti =

Mountain in Georgia

Bagineti
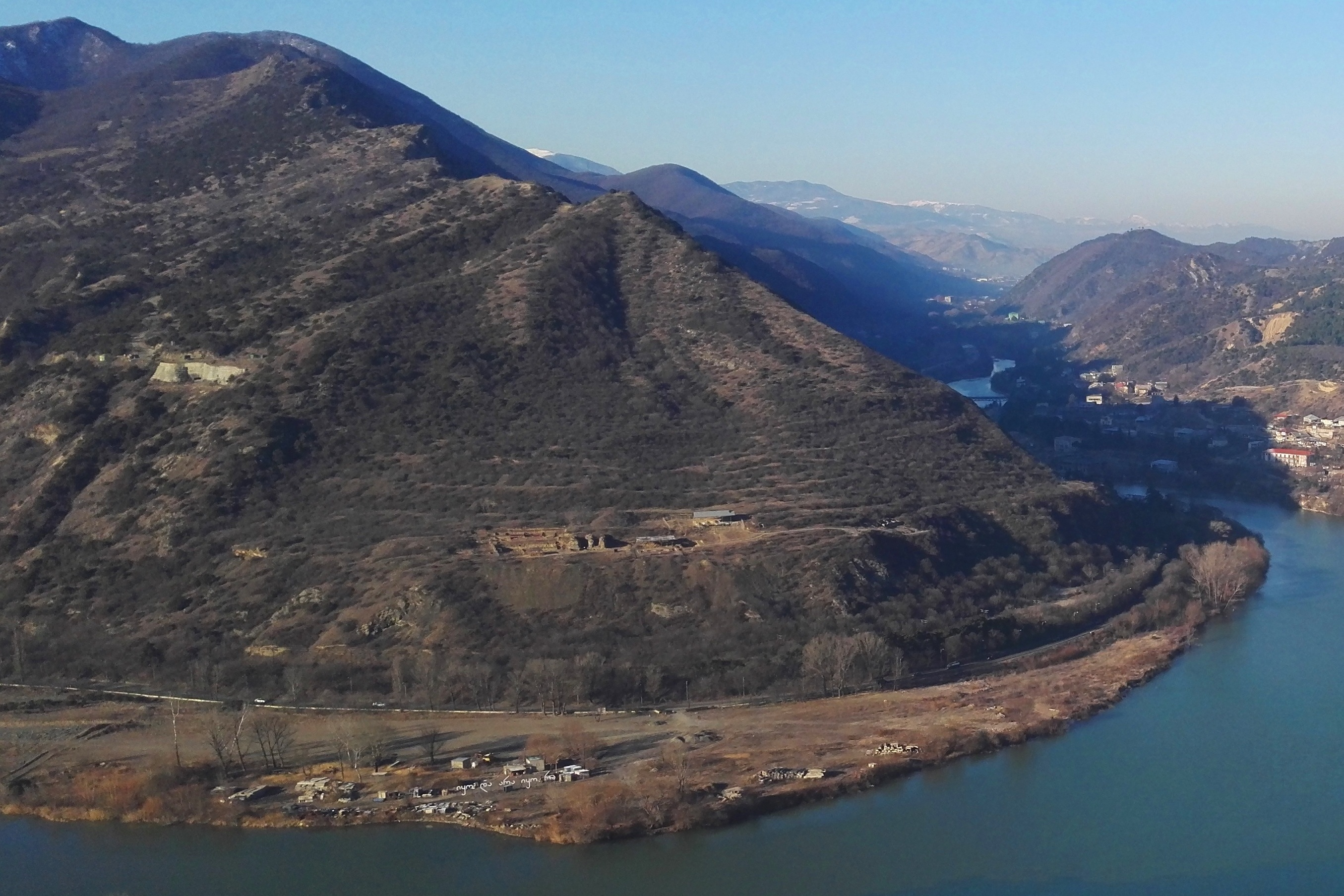
- View of the mountain from the east

Highest point
- Elevation: 662 m (2,172 ft)
- Coordinates: 41°50′16.6″N 44°43′18.2″E

Geography
- Location within Georgia
- Location: Georgia

Mount Bagineti (Georgian: ბაგინეთი) is a mountain (662 m a.s.l.) on the eastern slope of Trialeti Range, a part of Lesser Caucasus Mountains, in the Republic of Georgia, situated at the confluence of rivers Kura and Aragvi, near the ancient city of Mtskheta.

== Legend ==
According to The Georgian Chronicles, the eponymous ancestor of the Georgians, Kartlos, settled at the mountain, built a fortress, his own house, named it by his name, Kartli, and eventually was buried at the top of Bagineti. The country also received its name after the mountain, Kartli.

Later, in the times of the first Georgian king Pharnavaz, an idol of the god Armazi was put on the top of the mountain, and it changed its name to Armazi. The King Pharnavaz was also buried at the top of the mountain. Ruins of the ancient city of Armazi are found at the base of the mountain.
