= Stepan Malkhasyants =

Armenian academic (1857–1947)

- Born: November 7, 1857; Akhaltsikhe, Russian Empire
- Died: July 21, 1947 (aged 89); Yerevan, Armenian SSR, Soviet Union
- Education: Saint Petersburg State University
- Known for: Armenian Explanatory Dictionary
- Awards: Stalin Prize (1946)
- Scientific career
- Fields: Philology, Armenian studies, Oriental Studies
- Workplaces: Armenian Academy of Sciences

Stepan Sargsi Malkhasyants (Armenian: Ստեփան Սարգսի Մալխասյանց; 7 November [O.S. 26 October] 1857 – July 21, 1947) was an Armenian academician, philologist, linguist, and lexicographer. An expert in classical Armenian literature, Malkhasyants created the critical editions and translated the works of many classical Armenian historians into modern Armenian and contributed seventy years of his life to the advancement of the study of the Armenian language.

== Early life and education ==
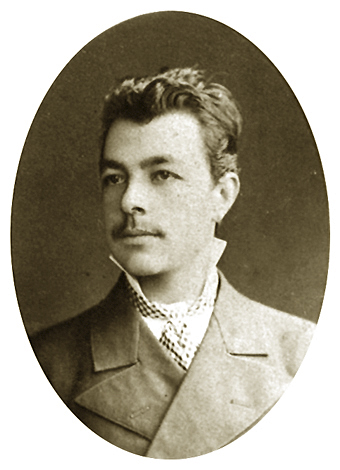
Stepan Malkhasyants from his student years.

Malkhasyants was born in Akhaltsikhe, Russian Empire (now Akhaltsikhe, Georgia), in 1857. He received his primary education at the Karapetian Parochial school in Akhaltsikh. From 1874 to 1878, he attended the Gevorgian Seminary in Vagharshapat (current-day Echmiadzin). Malkhasiants was admitted to the department of Oriental studies at Saint Petersburg State University. He graduated in 1889 with an emphasis in Armenian-Sanskrit and Armenian-Georgian studies.

Following the completion of his studies, Malkhasyants taught Armenian at schools and became a regular contributor to periodicals and academic journals. Returning to the Transcaucasus, he took up a teaching position at the Karapetian Parochial school and later the Yeghiazarian gymnasium (also in Akhaltsikh), the Nersisian, Hovnanian and Gayanian seminaries in Tiflis and at the Gevorgian Seminary. After the founding of Yerevan State University in February 1920, Malkhasyants became a part of the faculty of the department of history and linguistics and was the first instructor to deliver a lecture there. In 1940, Malkhasyants was awarded with his doktor nauk in philology, honoris causa. In 1943 he helped found the Armenian Academy of Sciences and was formally elected into its body.

== Works ==
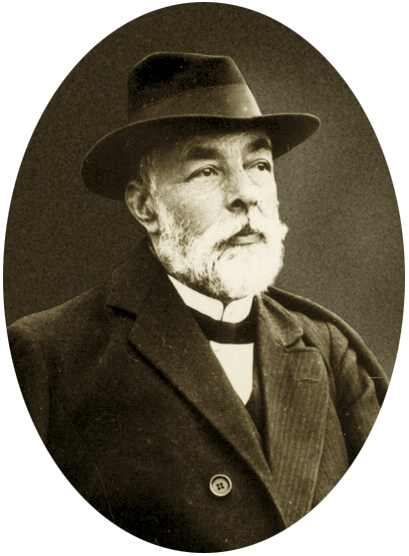
Stepan Malkhasyants.

Malkhasyants took an active interest in the study of classical and medieval Armenian historiography prior to his graduation from Saint Petersburg State. In 1885, he published the first critical edition of the Universal History, written by the eleventh-century historian Stepanos Taronetsi. He later published several other critical texts by Armenian historians, including the primary histories written by Pavstos Buzand (1896), Sebeos (1899), Ghazar Parpetsi (1904) and Movses Khorenatsi (1940). Malkhasyants took a particular interest in Movses Khorenatsi and published over 50 works on the "Father of Armenian history" in the form of books, articles, and monographs. Subsequent works also focused on the grammar of classical Armenian and ashkharabar (modern Armenian). His Russian translation of the eighteenth-century Catholicos Simeon Yerevantsi's history work, Jambr, was published in 1958.

In 1944-1945, Malkhasyants completed a monumental four-volume Armenian-language dictionary, Armenian Explanatory Dictionary (Hayeren Batsadrakan Barraran, Հայերէն Բացատրական Բառարան), which went on to win the Stalin Prize in 1946. The dictionary, which Malkhasiants began putting together in 1922, provides an exhaustive vocabulary list of classical Armenian, middle Armenian, and modern Armenian words, as well as an exploration of the numerous dialects spoken by Armenians.

Malkhasyants also translated some foreign works into Armenian. In addition to Shakespeare's plays, including King Lear and Macbeth, he also translated the writings of Georg Ebers.

He died in Yerevan at the age of 89 in 1947.
