= Pharnavaz II =

King of Iberia
- Reign: 63-30 BC
- Predecessor: Artoces
- Successor: Mirian II
- Dynasty: Artaxiad dynasty of Iberia

Pharnavaz II (Georgian: ფარნავაზ II) (died 30 BC), of the Artaxiad dynasty, was a king (mepe) of Iberia (Kartli, eastern Georgia) from 63 to 30 BC. He is known as Pharnabazus in Classical sources, and is commonly identified with the Bartom or Bratman of the medieval Georgian chronicles.

He succeeded upon the death of his father Artag who had been defeated by the Roman general Pompey in 65 BC. However, Roman hegemony over Iberia proved to be impermanent, and, in 36 BC, the legate Publius Canidius Crassus led his army into Iberia, forcing Parnavaz to make an alliance against Zober, king of neighboring Albania. Canidius and Parnavaz marched to Albania and subdued its people. Incidentally, no Georgian source documents these events reported by Cassius Dio in his Roman History Instead, the Georgian annals concentrate upon the homecoming of Mirvan, the exiled son of Parnajom, who had been brought up in Iran. Mirvan returned to Kartli at the head of an Iranian army, killed Bartom and became a king.

Bartom is said to have adopted Kartam, the descendant of Kuji (the alleged ruler of Egrisi in the time of the first Iberian king Parnavaz). But Kartam had also been killed in battle against Mirvan. Nevertheless, Kartam's pregnant wife – the daughter of Bartom – fled to Armenia where she gave birth to a son named Aderki.

Preceded by Artag	King of Iberia; 63 BC – 30 BC	Succeeded by Mirian II
