= Artaxias I of Iberia =

King of Iberia
- Reign: 90-78 BC
- Predecessor: Parnajom
- Successor: Artoces of Iberia
- Died: 78 BC
- Spouse: sister of Pharnajom
- Issue: Artoces
- Dynasty: Artaxiad dynasty of Iberia
- Father: Artavasdes I of Armenia?

Artaxias I, of the Artaxiad dynasty, was a king (mepe) of Iberia (modern-day Georgia) from 90 to 78 BC. He is known exclusively from the medieval Georgian chronicles which gives his name as Arshak (Georgian: არშაკი).

A son of the king of Armenia, purportedly of Artavasdes I (r. c. 161–post 123 BC), he is reported to have been installed following the nobles’ revolt against the Iberian king P’arnajom of the Pharnabazid dynasty. The rebels justified their choice by emphasizing that he was married to a Pharnabazid princess, probably a sister of P’arnajom. The account of his reign is remarkably short, stating only that his reign was without any major trouble and that he further fortified the city of Tsunda in Javakheti.

Preceded by P’arnajom	King of Iberia; 90–78 BC	Succeeded by Artoces
