= Pharnajom =

King of Iberia
- Reign: 109–90 BC
- Predecessor: Mirian I
- Successor: Artaxias I
- Dynasty: Pharnavazid
- Father: Mirian I
- Mother: Sauromaces I's daughter

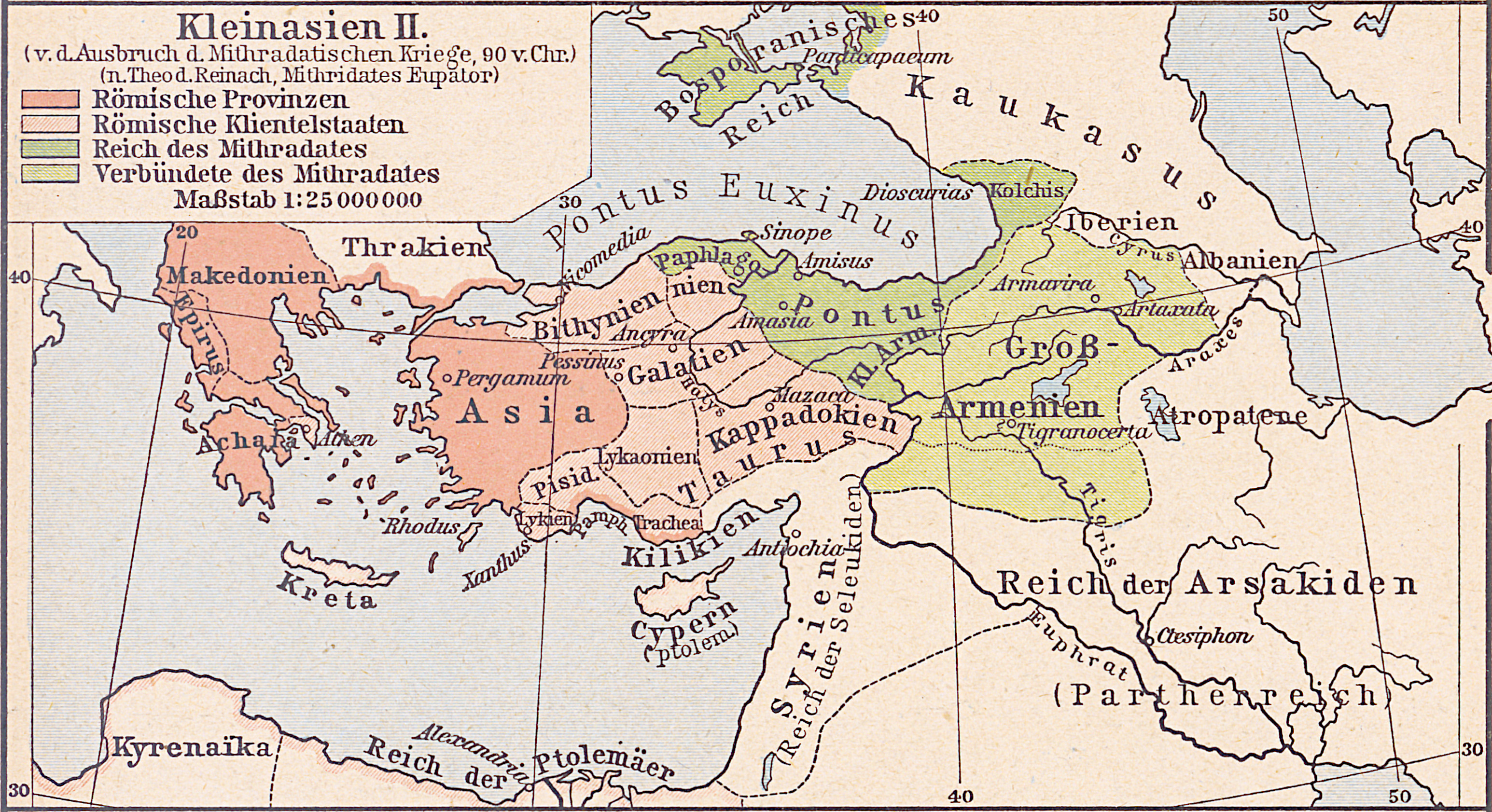
Asia Minor around 90 BC

Pharnajom or Pharnajob (Georgian: ფარნაჯომი, ფარნაჯობი; died 90 BC) was a king (mepe) of Iberia from 109 to 90 BC, the fourth in the P'arnavaziani line. He is known exclusively from the royal list included in the medieval Georgian chronicles.

Pharnajom succeeded on death of his father, Mirian I in 109 BC. He is reported to have added another idol, that of the god Zaden, to the Iberian pagan pantheon, and to have built a fortress to house it.

Prior to 90 BC, Pharnajom converted to Zoroastrianism, abandoning K'art'velian polytheism. He built a fire temple in Nekresi. His nobles sent an ambassador to the king of Armenia promising the throne to his son, Artaxias. At the battle of Tasiri between Pharnajom and his nobles, the king is defeated and killed, and the crown given to Artaxias I of Iberia. Pharnajom's son, Mirian (Mirvan), survives, however, to be taken and brought up at the Parthian court.

== Sources ==
- Baumer, Christoph (2021). History of the Caucasus. Vol. 1: At the Crossroads of Empires. Bloomsbury Publishing. ISBN 9780755639694.
- Thomson, Robert W. (1996), Rewriting Caucasian History: The Medieval Armenian Adaptation of the Georgian Chronicles, p. 42. Oxford University Press, ISBN 0-19-826373-2.
- Rapp, Stephen H. (2003), Studies In Medieval Georgian Historiography: Early Texts And Eurasian Contexts, pp. 282–284. Peeters Bvba ISBN 90-429-1318-5.
- Rapp, Stephen H. (2014). The Sasanian World Through Georgian Eyes: The Iranian Commonwealth in Late Antique Georgian Literature. Routledge.
- Toumanoff, Cyril. Chronology of the Early Kings of Iberia. Traditio 25 (1969), pp. 10–11.

Preceded by Mirian I	King of Iberia; 109–90 BC	Succeeded by Artaxias I
