= Kingdom of Iberia =

Ancient Georgian kingdom of Kartli

Kingdom of Iberia ქართლის სამეფო (Georgian)
- c. 302 BC – 580 AD
- Flag of the kingdom after the Christianization of Iberia

- Colchis and Iberia
- Status: Vassal state of the Seleucid Empire; (302–159 BC): Client state of the Roman Republic; (65–63 BC, 40–36 BC, 30–27 BC): Client state of the Roman Empire; (27 BC – 129 AD, 131–260 AD): Vassal state of Sassanid Persia; (260–265 AD): Client state of the Eastern Roman Empire; (298–363 AD): Vassal state of Sassanid Persia; (363–482 AD, 502–523 AD): Direct Sassanid Persian rule; (523–580 AD): Annexation by Sassanid Persia; (580–588 AD)
- Capital: Armazi; Mtskheta; Tbilisi
- Official languages: Greek–Aramaic (governance, literacy, and culture); Old Georgian (governance, literacy, and native language)
- Religion: Georgian paganism Zoroastrianism; Christianity (from 319)
- Government: Monarchy
- Historical era: Antiquity
  - Reign of Pharnavaz I: c. 302 BC
  - Christianization of Iberia during reign of Mirian III: 319 AD
  - Direct Sasanian control and abolition of the monarchy: 580 AD
Succeeded by
Principality of Iberia

In Greco-Roman geography, Iberia (Note: Ancient Greek: Ἰβηρία Iberia; Latin: Hiberia; Parthian: wurgān; Middle Persian: wiručān) was an exonym for the Georgian kingdom of Kartli, (Note: Georgian: ქართლი) known after its core province. The kingdom existed during Classical Antiquity and the Early Middle Ages, either as an independent state or as a dependent of larger empires, notably the Sassanid and Roman empires. Iberia, centered on present-day eastern Georgia, was bordered by Colchis in the west, Caucasian Albania in the east and Armenia in the south.

Its population, the Iberians, formed the nucleus of the Kartvelians (i.e., Georgians). Iberia, ruled by the Pharnavazid, Artaxiad, Arsacid and Chosroid royal dynasties, together with Colchis to its west, would form the nucleus of the unified medieval Kingdom of Georgia under the Bagrationi dynasty.

In the 4th century, during the reign of King Mirian III, Christianity was made the state religion of the kingdom. Starting in the early 6th century AD, the kingdom's position as a Sassanian vassal state was changed into direct Persian rule. In 580, king Hormizd IV (578–590) abolished the monarchy after the death of King Bakur III, and Iberia became a Persian province ruled by a marzpan (governor).

The term "Caucasian Iberia" is also used to distinguish it from the Iberian Peninsula in Southwestern Europe.

== Name ==
All exonyms are likely derived from gorgān (گرگان), the Persian designation of the Georgians, evolving from Parthian wurgān (𐭅𐭓𐭊𐭍) and Middle Persian wiručān (𐭥𐭫𐭥𐭰𐭠𐭭), rooting out from Old Persian vrkān (𐎺𐎼𐎣𐎠𐎴) meaning "the land of the wolves". This is also reflected in Old Armenian virk (վիրք), it being a source of Ancient Greek ibēríā (Ἰβηρία), that entered Latin as Hiberia. The transformation of vrkān into gorgān and alteration of v into g was a phonetic phenomenon in the word formation of Proto-Aryan and ancient Iranian languages. All exonyms are simply phonetic variations of the same root vrk/varka (𐎺𐎼𐎣) meaning wolf.

Historian Adolfo Domínguez Monedero argues that the name Iberian was given by Ancient Greeks to two different peoples located at the extremities of their world (in the Iberian Peninsula and the Caucasus) due to the mythical wealth associated with them (Tartessos and the Golden Fleece of Colchis).

== History ==
=== Early history ===
Map of the Caucasus region around 290 BCE

In earliest times, the area of Caucasian Iberia was inhabited by several related tribes stemming from the Kura-Araxes culture.

According to Cyril Toumanoff, the Moschians were an early proto-Georgian tribe that played a leading role in the consolidation of Iberian tribes largely inhabiting eastern and southern Georgia. The Moschians may have moved slowly to the northeast, forming settlements as they traveled. One of these settlements was Mtskheta, the future capital of the Kingdom of Iberia. The Mtskheta tribe was later ruled by a prince locally known as mamasakhlisi ("father of the household" in Georgian).

The written sources for the early periods of Iberia's history are mostly medieval Georgian chronicles, which modern scholarship interprets as semi-legendary narratives. One such chronicle, Moktsevay Kartlisay ("Conversion of Kartli"), relates that a ruler named Azo and his people came from Arian-Kartli—the initial homeland of the proto-Iberians, which had been under Achaemenid rule until the fall of the Persian Empire—and settled on the site where Mtskheta was later founded. Another Georgian chronicle, Kartlis Tskhovreba ("The Life of Kartli"), presents Azo as an officer of Alexander's, who massacred a local ruling family and conquered the area, until being defeated at the end of the 4th century BC by Prince Pharnavaz, then a local chief.

The story of Alexander's invasion of Kartli, although legendary, nevertheless reflects the establishment of Georgian monarchy in the Hellenistic period and the desire of later Georgian literati to associate this event with the renowned conqueror.

=== Pharnavaz I and his descendants ===
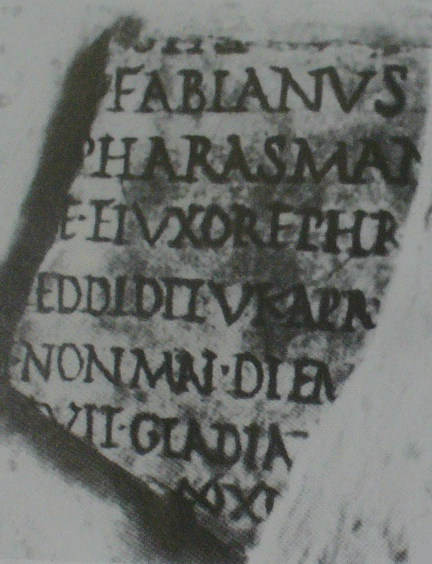
A fragment of the Fasti Ostienses mentioning Pharasmanes II of Iberia.

Pharnavaz, victorious in a power struggle, became the first king of Iberia (c. 302 – c. 237 BC). According to later Georgian chronicles, after repelling an invasion, he subjugated neighboring regions, including a significant part of the western Georgian state of Colchis (locally known as Egrisi), and appears to have secured recognition of the newly founded state by the Seleucids of Syria. Pharnavaz is also credited with building a major citadel, Armaztsikhe, erecting a temple to the god Armazi, and creating a new administrative system by subdividing the country into counties known as saeristavos.

His successors controlled the mountain passes of the Caucasus, with the Daryal Pass (also known as the Iberian Gates) being the most important.

The period following this prosperity was marked by incessant warfare, as Iberia was forced to defend its territories against numerous invasions. Some southern regions of Iberia, conquered from the Kingdom of Armenia in the 2nd century BC, were reunited with Armenia, while Colchian lands seceded to form separate princedoms (sceptuchoi). At the end of the 2nd century BC, the Pharnavazid king Pharnajom was dethroned by his subjects after converting to Zoroastrianism, and the crown was given to the Armenian prince Artaxias, who ascended the Iberian throne in 93 BC, establishing the Artaxiad dynasty of Iberia.

=== Roman period and Roman–Parthian rivalry ===
This close association with the Kingdom of Armenia and the Kingdom of Pontus drew Iberia into a Roman invasion in 65 BC, led by the Roman general Pompey during his war against Mithradates VI of Pontus and Armenia. Rome, however, did not establish permanent control over Iberia. Twenty-nine years later, in 36 BC, Roman forces again marched into Iberia, compelling King Pharnavaz II to participate in their campaign against Albania.

While the western Georgian kingdom of Colchis was administered as a Roman province, Iberia accepted Roman imperial protection while retaining a significant degree of autonomy. A stone inscription discovered at Mtskheta refers to the 1st-century ruler Mithridates I (AD 58–106) as "the friend of the Caesars" and as king "of the Roman-loving Iberians." Emperor Vespasian fortified the ancient site of Arzami near Mtskheta for the Iberian kings in AD 75.

During the following two centuries, Roman influence in Iberia remained substantial. By the reign of King Pharsman II (116–132), Iberia had regained much of its former strength. Relations between Pharsman II and the Roman emperor Hadrian were reportedly strained, although Hadrian is said to have sought reconciliation. Under Hadrian's successor, Antoninus Pius, relations improved considerably: Pharsman is reported to have visited Rome, where, according to Dio Cassius, a statue was erected in his honor and he was granted the right to offer sacrifices.

This period marked a significant shift in Iberia's political status. Rome increasingly regarded Iberia as an ally rather than as a subordinate state, a situation that largely persisted even during periods of Roman conflict with the Parthians.

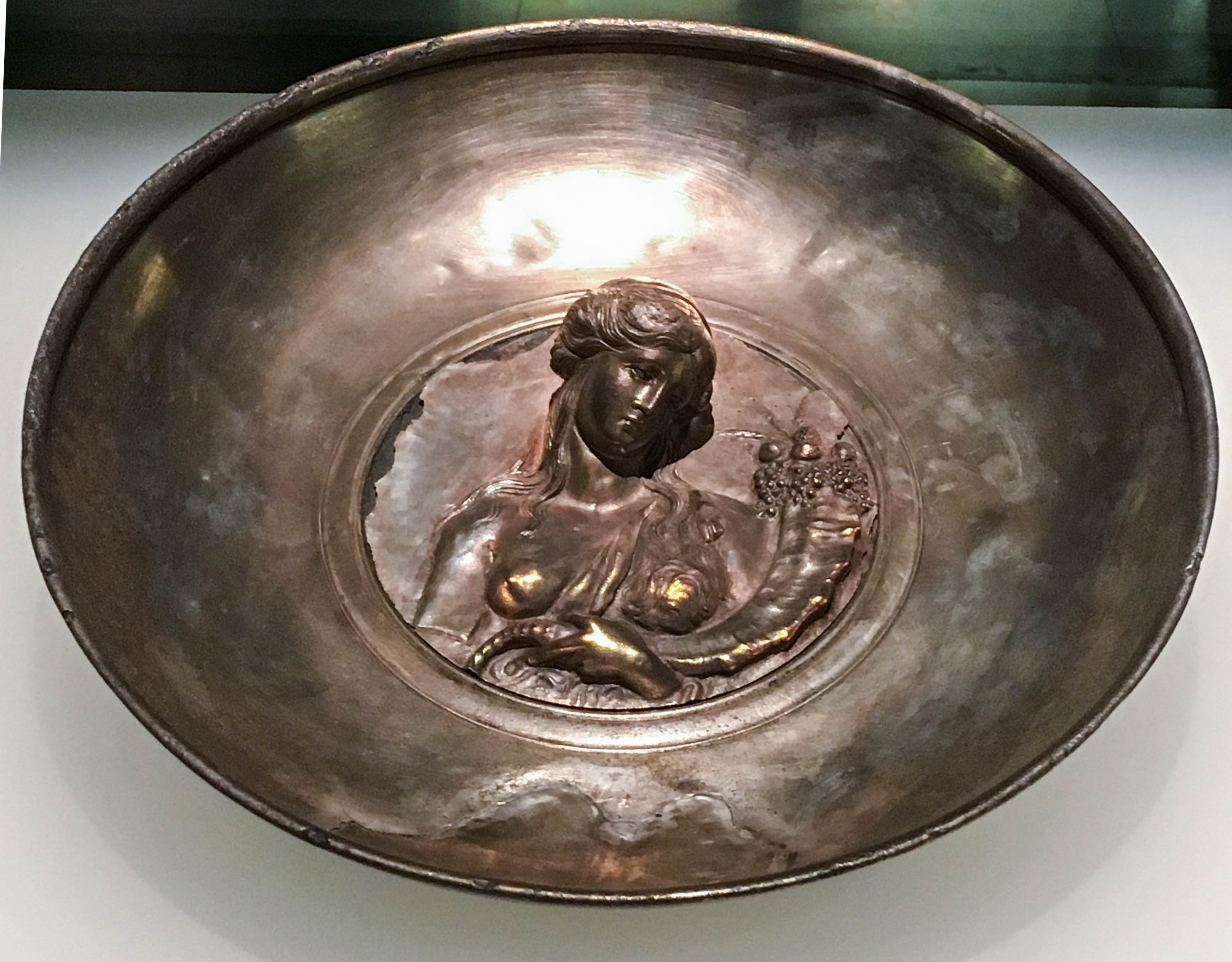
Patera from Mtskheta, likely depicting Fortuna (2nd century AD, Georgian National Museum)

From the first centuries of the Christian era, the cults of Mithras and Zoroastrianism were widely practiced in Iberia. Archaeological excavations of rich burials at Bori, Armazi, and Zguderi have yielded silver drinking cups bearing images of horses standing before fire altars or raising a foreleg above them. The cult of Mithras, distinguished by its syncretic character and its compatibility with local religious traditions—particularly solar worship within Georgian mythology—gradually merged with indigenous beliefs. Some scholars have suggested that Mithras may have served as a precursor to the cult of Saint George in pre-Christian Georgia.

Over time, Iranian religious concepts and cultural practices increasingly influenced the Iberian court and elite. The Armazian script and language, derived from Aramaic, were adopted for official use, as evidenced by a number of inscriptions dating to the Classical and Hellenistic periods found in Colchis. Court ceremonial was modeled on Iranian prototypes, elite dress reflected Iranian styles, and Iranian personal names became common among the Iberian aristocracy. The official cult of the god Armazi was introduced by King Pharnavaz in the 3rd century BC, a development later associated in medieval Georgian chronicles with Zoroastrianism.

=== Between Rome/Byzantium and Persia ===
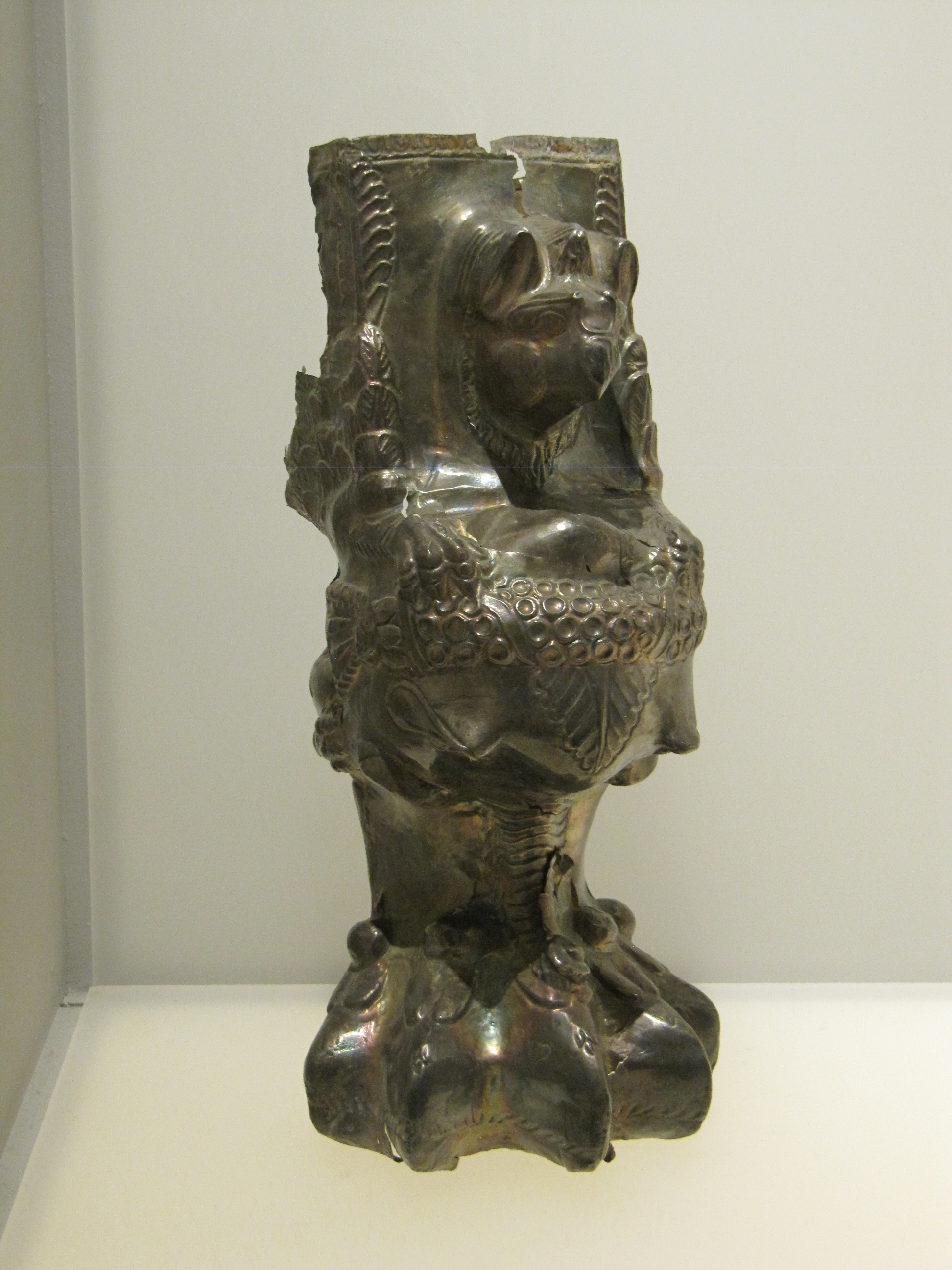
Claw foot of the royal throne found at Mount Bagineti, 2nd century AD. Kept at the Georgian National Museum in Tbilisi.

A decisive turning point in the history of Iberia was the foundation of the Sasanian (or Sassanid) Empire in 224 by Ardashir I. By replacing the weak Parthian realm with a strong, centralized state, this development altered Iberia's political orientation away from Rome. During the reign of Shapur I (241–272), Iberia became a tributary of the Sasanian Empire. Relations between the two states initially appear to have been amicable, as Iberia cooperated with Persian military campaigns against Rome, and the Iberian king Amazasp III (260–265) was listed among the high dignitaries of the Sasanian realm rather than as a subdued vassal.

The expansionist tendencies of the Sasanians soon became evident through their promotion of Zoroastrianism, which was likely established in Iberia between the 260s and 290s. However, under the terms of the Peace of Nisibis in 298, the Roman Empire regained control over Caucasian Iberia as a vassal state. Rome acknowledged Iberian authority over much of the Caucasus and recognized Mirian III, the first ruler of the Chosroid dynasty, as king of Iberia.

=== Adoption of Christianity and Sasanian Persian period ===
Roman influence proved decisive in religious matters, as King Mirian III and leading nobles converted to Christianity around 319, declaring it the state religion of Iberia. This event is associated with the mission of a Cappadocian woman, Saint Nino, who had been preaching Christianity in the Georgian kingdom since 303.

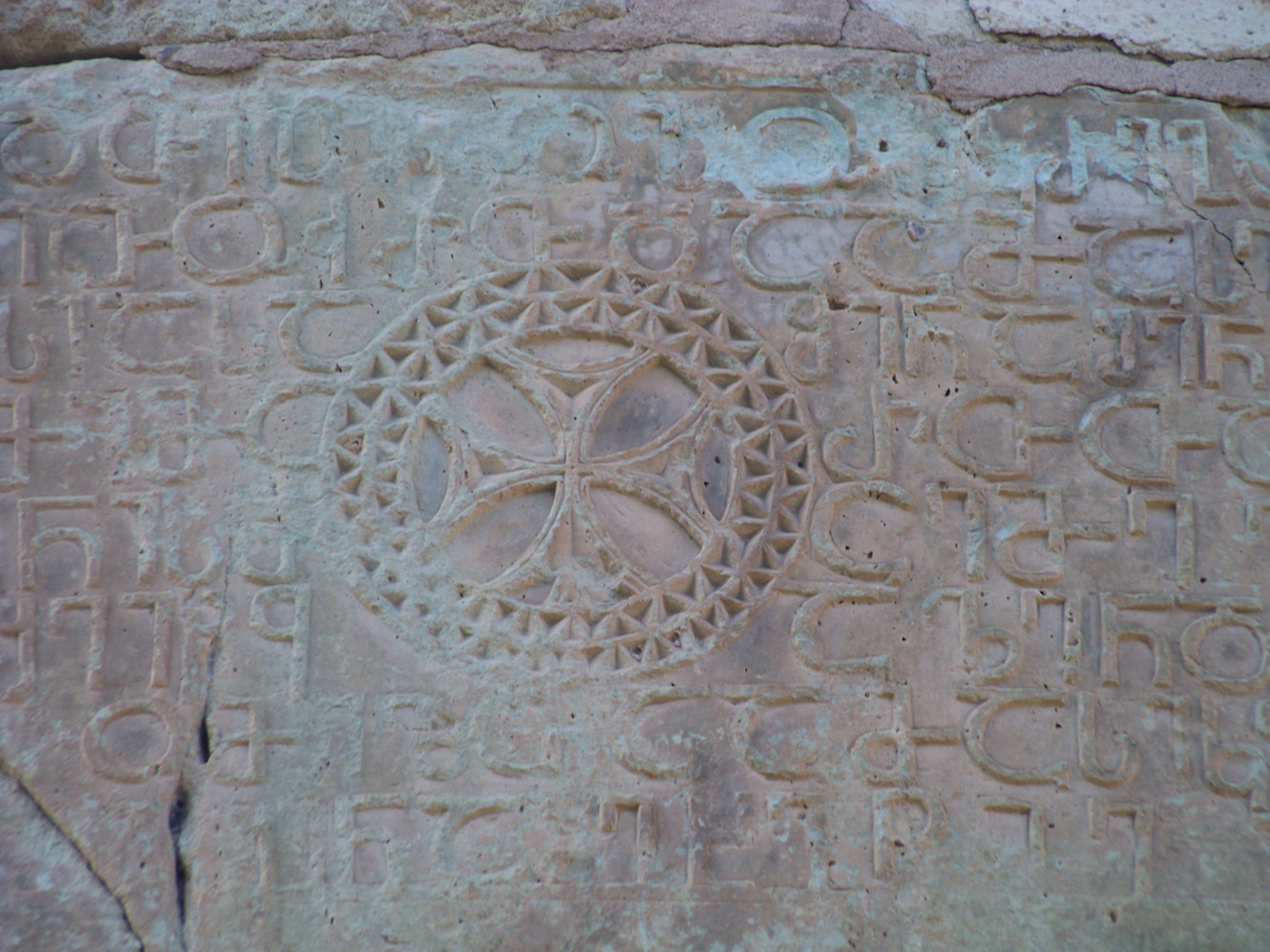
Bolnisi inscriptions, c. 494 AD, Simon Janashia Museum of Georgia, Tbilisi

Christianity became a strong cultural and political link between Georgia and Rome (later Byzantium), influencing state culture and society. Iranian elements in Georgian art gradually declined with the adoption of Christianity in the fourth century.

Following the death of Julian the Apostate in 363 during his failed campaign in Persia, Rome ceded control of Iberia to Persia. King Varaz-Bakur I (Asphagur) (363–365) became a Persian vassal, as confirmed by the Peace of Acilisene in 387. Later, Pharsman IV (406–409) preserved Iberian autonomy and ceased tribute payments to Persia.

Sasanian rulers established a viceroy (pitiaxae/bidaxae) to oversee their vassal, eventually making the office hereditary in the ruling house of Lower Kartli, creating the Kartli pitiaxate and bringing significant territory under Persian influence. Despite remaining part of the kingdom of Kartli, the viceroys became centers of Persian authority. Sasanian policy challenged Iberian Christianity, promoting Zoroaster's teachings. By the mid-5th century, Zoroastrianism was a second official religion in eastern Georgia alongside Christianity.

The early reign of Vakhtang I, known as Gorgasali (447–502), marked a revival of the kingdom. Formally a Persian vassal, he secured northern borders, subjugated Caucasian mountaineers, and brought adjacent western and southern Georgian territories under his control. He established an autocephalic patriarchate at Mtskheta and made Tbilisi his capital. In 482, he led a general uprising against Persia, initiating a twenty-year struggle for independence. Lacking Byzantine support, he was eventually defeated and died in battle in 502.

=== Fall of the kingdom ===
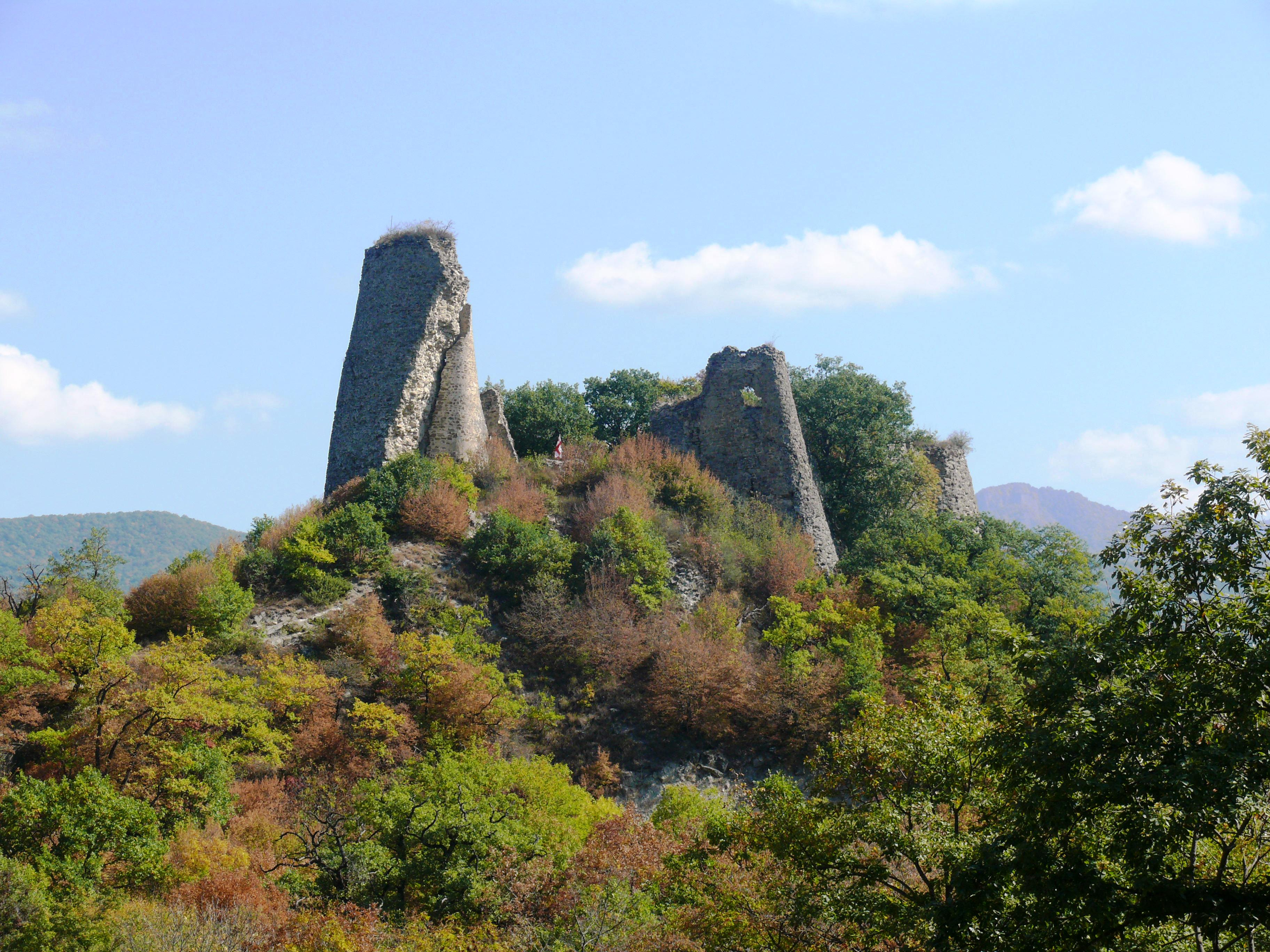
Ruins of Ujarma, once an Iberian stronghold under Vakhtang I.

The continuing rivalry between Byzantium and Sasanian Persia for supremacy in the Caucasus had severe consequences for Iberia. The unsuccessful uprising of 523, led by the Georgians under Gurgen, weakened the kingdom. Thereafter, the Iberian king retained only nominal authority, while real power was exercised by the Persians. In 580, Hormizd IV (578–590) abolished the monarchy following the death of King Bacurius III, converting Iberia into a Persian province administered by a marzpan (governor). Georgian nobles appealed to the Byzantine emperor Maurice to restore the kingdom in 582, but in 591 Byzantium and Persia agreed to divide Iberia: Tbilisi remained under Persian control, while Mtskheta came under Byzantine administration.

At the beginning of the 7th century, the truce between Byzantium and Persia collapsed. The Iberian prince Stephen I (c. 590–627) allied with Persia in 607 to reunite Iberian territories, a goal he largely achieved. However, Emperor Heraclius's campaigns in 627–628 defeated both the Georgians and Persians, establishing Byzantine predominance in western and eastern Georgia until the Arab invasion.

=== Arab period and restoration of the kingship ===
The Arabs reached Iberia around 645 and compelled its eristavi (prince), Stephen II (r. 637–650), to abandon allegiance to Byzantium and recognize the Caliph as suzerain. Iberia became a tributary state, and an Arab emir was installed in Tbilisi circa 653.

By the early 9th century, Ashot I (r. 813–830) of the new Bagrationi dynasty, based in southwestern Georgia, took advantage of the weakening of Arab control to establish himself as hereditary prince of Iberia, holding the Byzantine title kouropalates. His successor, Adarnase IV of Iberia, formally a vassal of Byzantium, was crowned "king of Iberia" in 888. His descendant, Bagrat III (r. 975–1014), united the various principalities to form a consolidated Georgian monarchy.

== Eastern and Western Iberians ==
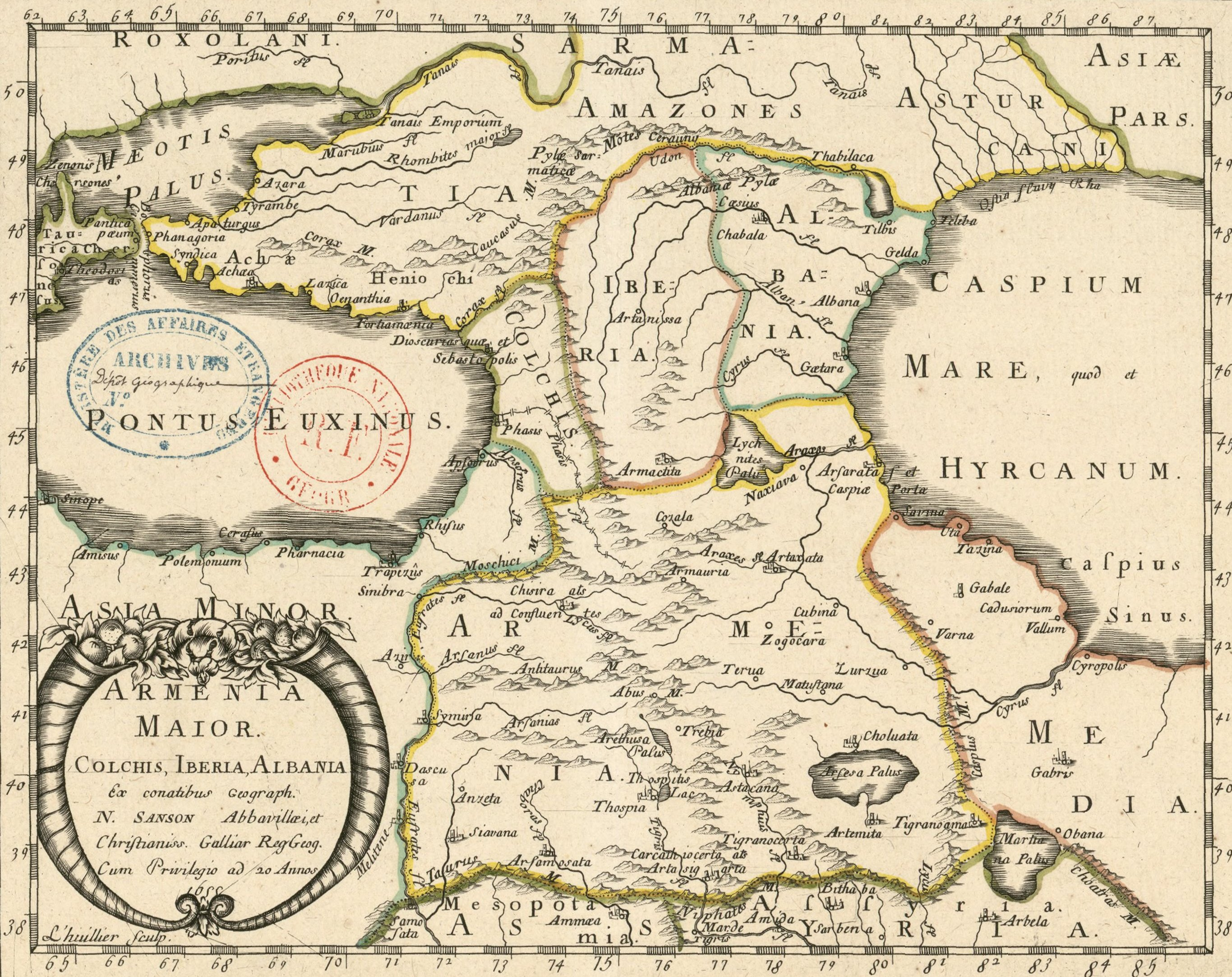
Map of the Kingdom of Iberia and its neighbouring states by Nicolas Sanson (1655)

The similarity of the name with the old inhabitants of the Iberian peninsula, the 'Western' Iberians, has led to an idea of ethnogenetical kinship between them and the people of Caucasian Iberia (called the 'Eastern' Iberians).

It has been advocated by various ancient and medieval authors, although they differed in approach to the problem of the initial place of their origin. The theory seems to have been popular in medieval Georgia. The prominent Georgian religious writer George the Hagiorite (1009–1065) wrote about the wish of certain Georgian nobles to travel to the Iberian peninsula and visit the local Georgians of the West, as he called them.

== See also ==
- Georgian monarchs family tree of Iberia
- Iberian War
- Georgia in the Roman era

== Bibliography ==
- Braund, David (1994). Georgia in Antiquity: A History of Colchis and Transcaucasian Iberia, 550 BC-AD 562. New York: Oxford University Press. ISBN 0-19-814473-3.
- Hitchins, Keith (2001). "Georgia ii. History of Iranian-Georgian Relations". Encyclopaedia Iranica, Vol. X, Fasc. 4. pp. 464–470.
- Spaeth, Barbette Stanley (2013). The Cambridge Companion to Ancient Mediterranean Religions. Cambridge: Cambridge University Press. ISBN 978-0521113960.
- Lang, David Marshall (1966). The Georgians. London: Thames & Hudson.
- Lortkipanidze, Mariam; Japaridze, Otar; Muskhelishvili, David; Metreveli, Roin (2012). History of Georgia in four volumes, vol. I - History of Georgia from ancient times to the 4th century AD. Tbilisi: National Academy of Sciences of Georgia. ISBN 978-9941-19-405-4.
- Mikaberidze, Alexander (2015). Historical Dictionary of Georgia. Rowman & Littlefield. p. 528. ISBN 978-1442241466.
- Preud'homme, Nicolas Joseph (2024). À la porte des mondes. Histoire de l'Ibérie du Caucase. Bordeaux: Ausonius. ISBN 978-2356136084.
- Rapp, Stephen H. (2014). The Sasanian World Through Georgian Eyes: The Iranian Commonwealth in Late Antique Georgian Literature. Routledge.
- Rayfield, Donald (2012). Edge of Empires: A History of Georgia. Reaktion Books.
- Rosen, Roger; Foxx, Jeffrey Jay (2004). Georgia: A sovereign country of the Caucasus (3rd ed.). Odyssey Books & Maps.
- Schleicher, Frank (2021). Iberia Caucasia. Ein Kleinkönigreich im Spannungsfeld großer Imperien. Stuttgart: Kohlhammer.
- Suny, Ronald Grigor (1994). The Making of the Georgian Nation. Indiana University Press. ISBN 0-253-20915-3.
- Thomson, Robert W. (1996). Rewriting Caucasian History. Claredon Press. ISBN 9780198263739.
- Toumanoff, Cyril (1963). Studies in Christian Caucasian History. Washington D.C.: Georgetown University Press.
