= History of Iberia or Georgia, that is All of Sakartvelo =

Essay written by Teimuraz Batonishvili

History of Iberia or Georgia, that is All of Sakartvelo or History of Iveria - (Georgian: ისტორია დაწყებითგან ივერიისა, ესე იგი გიორგიისა, რომელ არს სრულიად საქართველოჲსა ან ივერიის ისტორია) - An essay on Georgia, written by Teimuraz Batonishvili on 1832. History covers the period from ancient times to King Mirian.

== Creation history ==
When Teimuraz Batonishvili moved to St. Petersburg, immediately after meeting Marie Brosset, Teimuraz started working on writing "History of Iveria". His tireless work was slowed down by illness. And when he fell ill in January 1836, he did not stop writing despite the doctors' prohibition, and his trip to Prussia stopped his work for several months.

After returning, he continued to work again. Some parts were already finished in 1837.

With this kind of work, the writing of the history of Iveria continued until the last years of his life. Although it was not left unfinished, it remained unpublished. Brosset writes: "For twenty years, he worked on the creation of an extensive history of the Georgian people... It is only known that the author wanted to take advantage of all foreign materials that were not translated into Georgian and Russian." (Note: М. Броссе, Некролог, Ж, М. Н. Пр. Ст. 39.)

The mentioned essay "History of Iberia or Georgia, that is All of Sakartvelo" After the request of Teimurazi's wife Elena and Brosset's petition before the Academy, D. was published. by Chubinov. St. Petersburg in 1848.

According to Zakaria Chichinadze, he also wrote the second volume of the history of Georgia, which was lost. (Note: ზ. ჭიჭინაძე, „საქართველოს ცხოვრება“, თბ. 1913, გვ. 32.)

== See also ==
Kings of Iveria According to Teimuraz Batonishvili

King	Reign/ Length of Reign		Dynasty
• Ⴀ. Pʽarnavaz I	302 – 237 BC	65	Kʽartʽlosid
• Ⴁ. Saurmag I	237 – 162 BC	75	Kʽartʽlosid-Pharnabazid
• Ⴂ. Mirvan I	162 – 144 BC	18	Kʽartʽlosid-Pharnabazid-Nimrodid
• Ⴃ. Pʽarnajam I	144 – 135 BC	9	Kʽartʽlosid-Pharnabazid-Nimrodid
• Ⴄ. Arshak I	135 – 123 BC	12	Aršakuniani
• Ⴅ. Artag I	123 – 107 BC	16	Aršakuniani
• Ⴆ. Bartom I	107 – 74 BC	33	Aršakuniani
• Ⴡ. Mirvan II	74 – 58 BC	16	Kʽartʽlosid-Pharnabazid-Nimrodid
• Ⴇ. Arshak II	58 – 33 BC	25	Kʽartʽlosid-Pharnabazid-Nimrodid
• Ⴈ. Arshak III	33 BC – 1 AD	32	Kʽartʽlosid-Pharnabazid-Nimrodid
Diarchy: ႨႠ. Aderki I (Aršakuniani), 1 AD – 44 (43); ႨႡ. Kʽartʽam I, 44 – 45 (1½); ႨႢ. Pʽarsman I, 45 – 87 (43); ႨႣ. Azork I, 87 – 119 (32); ႨႤ. Derok I, 119 – 128 (8); ႨႥ. P'arsman II the Good, 128 – 131, 131 – 144 (16); ႨႡ. Bartom II, 44 – 72 (28); ႨႢ. Kaos I, 72 – 87 (14); ႨႣ. Armazel I, 87 – 119 (32); ႨႤ. Amzasp I, 119 – 128 (8); ႨႥ. Mirdat I, 128 – 131 (3), 144 – 147 (2½)
• ႨႦ. Adam I	147 – 151	4	Aršakuniani
• ႨჁ. Queen Ghadana	151 – 165	14	
• ႨႧ. Pʽarsman III	165 – 191	26	Aršakuniani
• Ⴉ. Amzasp II	191 – 200	9	Aršakuniani
• ႩႠ. Rev	200 – 219	18	Aršakuniani
• ႩႡ. Vachʽe	219 – 233	14	Aršakuniani
• ႩႢ. Bakur I	233 – 245	12	Aršakuniani
• ႩႣ. Mirdat II	245 – 259	14	Aršakuniani
• ႩႤ. Aspʽagur I	259 – 266	7	Aršakuniani
