= Style of the Georgian sovereign =

Formal mode of address to a Georgian monarch

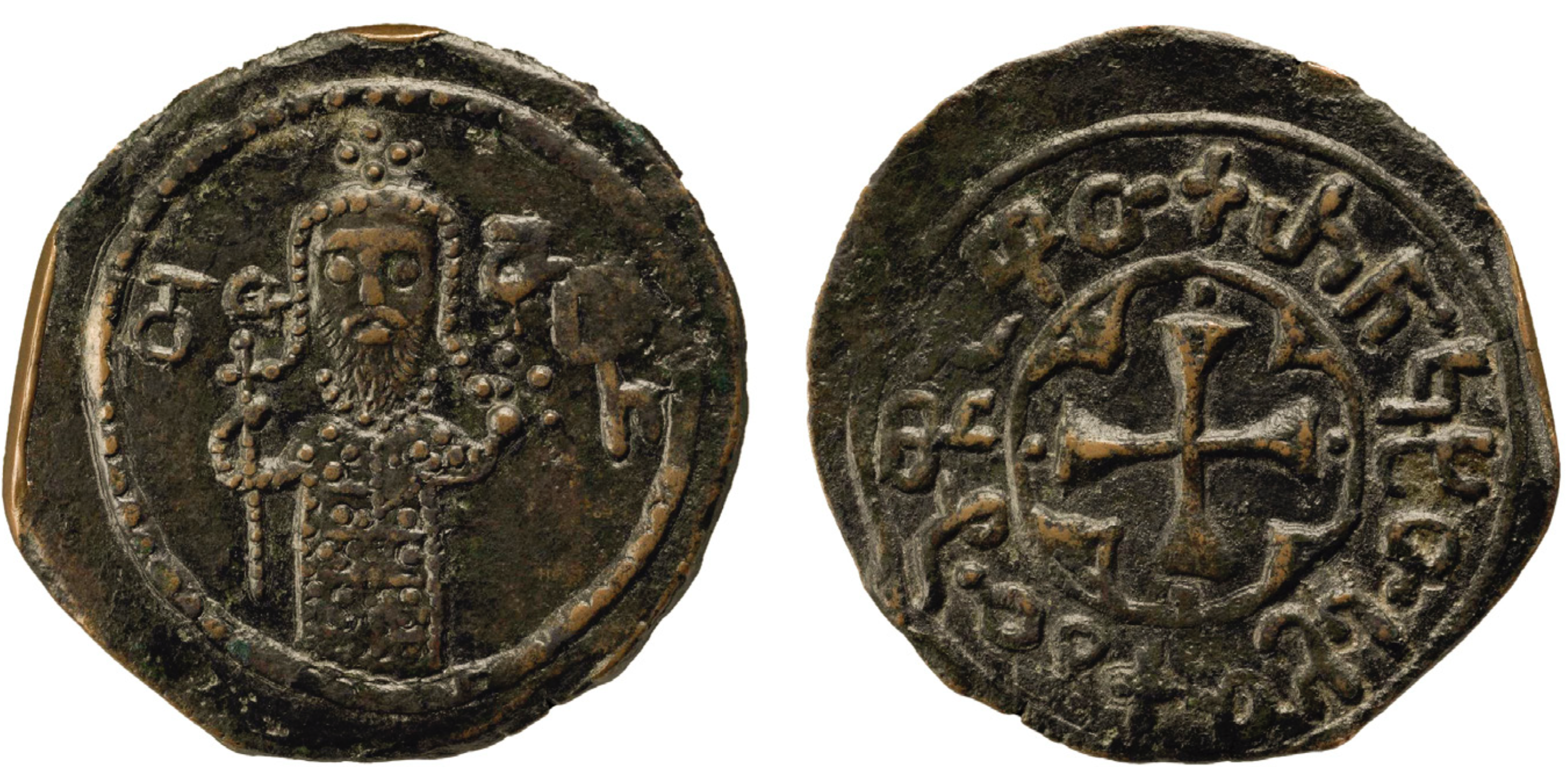
A copper coin of King David IV minted in Georgian Asomtavruli script reads
ႣႧႫႴႵႣႧႫႴႤႠႴႧႵႰႬႩႾႧႱႾႧ
meaning "Jesus Christ, [glorify] King David, of the Abkhazians, Iberians, Ranis, Kakhetians, Armenians". The king is depicted wearing sakkos with an imperial crown having pendilia and holding a cross alongside globus cruciger. A coin shows the king as a true Byzantine emperor. Kept at the British Museum in the United Kingdom since 1857.

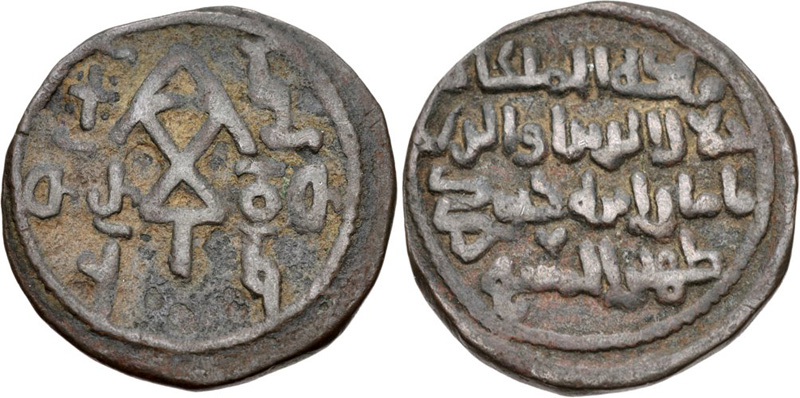
A copper coin of Queen Tamar minted in Georgian Asomtavruli script reads ႧႰႣႧ with ႵႩჃႩ representing Georgian numeral system, meaning "Tamar, David, AD 1200"; the text written in Arabic script reads ملكة الملكات جلال الدنيا والدين تامار ابنة كيوري ظهير المسيح meaning "Queen of Queens, the glory of the world and of the faith, Tamar, daughter of Kywri, champion of the Messiah". Kept at the Simon Janashia Museum of Georgia.

The style of the Georgian sovereign (Georgian: ქართველი მეფის წოდება, romanized: kartveli mepis ts'odeba) refers to the formal mode of address to a Georgian monarch (mepe) that evolved and changed many times since the establishment of the ancient Kingdom of Iberia, its transformation to the unified Kingdom of Georgia and its successive monarchies after the disintegration of the realm.

Pre-Christian Georgian monarchs of the Pharnavazid dynasty were divinely assigned pharnah and its loss usually led to the monarch's imminent death or overthrow in Georgian kingship. Introductory part of the style for the monarchs from the Bagrationi dynasty always started with "By the Grace of God, We, of Jesse, David, Solomon, Bagrationi, Supreme by God, anointed and crowned by God", underlining their divine right and claim for biblical descent. The consolidation of the deified Bagrationi dynasty and its unprecedented political unification of lands, would inaugurate the Georgian Golden Age and creation of the only medieval pan-Caucasian empire that would rule for a thousand years. Georgian monarchs would have intense religious and political competition with the Byzantine emperors, saw themselves as the successors of the emperor Constantine the Great and even as rulers of a new Byzantium based in the Caucasus, whence the clergy would view the Georgian Orthodoxy as an "imperial church" that would fight the heretics. Even though unprecedentedly "Byzantinized Georgia" entertained its powerful neighbor's concepts and models of Constantinopolitan bureaucracy and aristocracy, it was never slavishly adopted or mimicked; rather, it was creatively and deliberately adapted to the local culture and environment. At the same time, the rulers of Christian Georgia would still be embracing the traditional influences of the Persian Shahnameh and Arabic legends that would remain strong and intact; some of their styles would even become Islamic in type. As the Crown would be gathering additional lands the style would continue to expand, but remain distinctly enumerated and include all the subjects of the Georgian monarch. Even after the collapse of the unified kingdom, Georgian kings would continue to emblazon themselves with the former imperial style and they would stake the claim to be the absolute rulers of all-Georgia. This imperial legacy of the Bagrations continues to bear fruit even today, with its self-image as the unrivalled pinnacle of the Georgian politics, culture and society.

According to the chronicler of Queen Tamar, verbally insulting a monarch was punishable with tongue mutilation and decapitation, always carried out by non-Georgian executioners. Even though the capital punishment was extremely rare in high medieval Georgia, the royal court would never pardon the insult towards a monarch. King Vakhtang VI, however, maintained that there was no official punishment for lèse-majesté.

== Style ==
=== Sovereigns of Iberia ===
Style	Sovereign
King of all Kartli and Eguri.	King Pharnavaz I
King of the Iberians.	King Artoces
King of the Iberians.	King Pharnavaz II
King of the Iberians.	King Artaxias II
Great King of Iberia.	King Pharasmanes I
King of the Iberians.	King Mihrdat I
King of Iberia.	King Pharasmanes II
Great King of the Iberians.	King Ghadam
Great King of the Iberians.	King Amazasp II
King of the Iberians.	King Aspacures I
King of Iberia, Somkhiti, Rani, Hereti, Movakani and Colchis.	King Mirian III
King of the Iberians.	King Mihrdat V
King of Iberia, King of the Ten Kings.	King Vakhtang I
King of the Iberians.	King Bacurius III
King of the Iberians.	King Adarnase IV
King of the Iberians.	King David II
King of the Iberians.	King Bagrat II
King of the Iberians, the kouropalates of all the East, the eye of Orthodoxy.	King David III
King of Kings of the Iberians.	King Gurgen

=== Sovereigns of the united Georgia ===
Style	Sovereign
King of the Abkhazians and Iberians, of Tao, and of the Ranis and Kakhetians, and the great kouropalates of all the East.	King Bagrat III
King of the Abkhazians and Iberians, the kourapalates of all the East.	King George I
King of Kings, of the Abkhazians and Iberians, strong and invincible, the nobilissimus of all the East, the kouropalates, the sebastos, the Orthodox king.	King Bagrat IV
King of the Abkhazians and Iberians, the nobilissimus, the sebastos, the caesar of all the East and the West.	King George II
King of Kings, of the Abkhazians, Iberians, Ranis, Kakhetians, Armenians, of Shaki, Alania and the Rus, Sword of the Messiah, emperor (basileus) of all the East, the invincible, servant and defender of God, the Orthodox king.	King David IV
King of Kings, Sword of the Messiah, of the Abkhazians, Iberians, Ranis, Kakhetians and Armenians, king of all the East.	King Demetrius I
King of Kings, sword of the Messiah.	King David V
King of Kings, of the Abkhazians, Iberians, Ranis, Kakhetians, Armenians, Shirvanshah and Shahanshah, master of the East and the North, son of Demetre, sword of the Messiah, son of King of Kings.	King George III
King of Kings, Queen of Queens, empress (autokrator) of all the East and West, champion of the Messiah, of the Abkhazians, Iberians, Ranis, Kakhetians, and Armenians, Shirvanshah and Shahanshah, the great queen, the Glory of the World and of the Faith, daughter of the great King of Kings, sovereign of Christendom.	Queen Tamar I
King of Kings, son of Tamar, of the Abkhazians, Iberians, Ranis, Kakhetians and Armenians, Shirvanshah and Shahanshah, the Sovereign of all the East and the West, sword of the Messiah, lord of the Javakhians, the great king, glory of the world and faith.	King George IV
Queen of Kings and Queens, the glory of the world, kingdom and of the faith, daughter of Tamar, champion of the Messiah.	Queen Rusudan
King of Kings, son of King of Kings Rusudan, of the Abkhazians, Iberians, Ranis, Kakhetians and Armenians, Shirvanshah and Shahanshah, the Sovereign of all Georgia and the North, slave of Qaan, of the ruler of the world, David the king.	King David VI
King of Kings, son of Giorgi, sword of the Messiah.	King David VII
King of Kings, in the name of the Father, the Son and the Holy Spirit.	King David VIII
King, in the name of the Father, the Son and the Holy Spirit.	King Vakhtang III
King of Kings of the Abkhazians, Iberians, Ranis, Kakhetians, Armenians, Shahanshah and Shirvanshah, of the East and the West, of the South and the North, of both countries, of two thrones and crowns, the godlike Suzerain and the Sovereign.	King George V
King of Kings of all.	King David IX
King of Kings of the Abkhazians, Iberians, Ranis, Kakhetians and Armenians, Shahanshah and Shirvanshah, the Suzerain and Sovereign of all the North, the East and the West, descendant of Gorgasali.	King Bagrat V
King of Kings of the Abkhazians, Iberians, Ranis, Kakhetians and Armenians, Shirvanshah and Shahanshah, of all Georgia, of all the East and the West, of the North, the Sovereign and Suzerain of two kingdoms, the ruler of all, the victorious king.	King George VII
King of the Abkhazians, Iberians, Ranis, Kakhetians and Armenians, Shirvanshah and Shahanshah of all the East and North, the Sovereign.	King Constantine I
King of Kings, of many, Shirvanshah, of the Abkhazians, Iberians, Ranis, Kakhetians, Armenians, of all Georgia and the North, of the West and the East, the Suzerain and Sovereign of two golden thrones and all the lands.	King Alexander I
King of Kings, Suzerain and Sovereign of two thrones and kingdoms, of the Abkhazians, Iberians, Ranis, Kakhetians and Armenians, descendant of Nimrod, slave of God, Shahanshah and Shirvanshah, powerful ruler and an absolute sovereign of all the East and the West.	King George VIII
King of Kings, strong and invincible, majestic and protector of the holy kingdom, of the Jikians, Abkhazians, Iberians, Ranis, Kakhetians and Armenians, Shirvanshah, of all the East and the West, of all Georgia, of all the North, the Suzerain and Sovereign of the throne.	King Bagrat VI

=== Sovereigns of Kartli ===
Style	Sovereign
King of Kings, of the Abkhazians, Iberians, Ranis, Kakhetians, Armenians, Shirvanshah and Shahanshah, possessor of the kingdom and majesty, master of all the east and the north.	King Simon I
King of Kings and Sovereign of Kartli.	King George X
King of Kings and Sovereign of Kartli, of the Abkhazians, Iberians, Ranis, Kakhetians, Armenians, Shirvanshah and Shahanshah, the possessor, the master and holder of all the domains of the east and the north.	King Rostom
King of Kings and Sovereign of Kartli.	King Vakhtang V
King of Kings and Sovereign of Kartli.	King Luarsab II
King of Kings and Sovereign of Kartli, by will of God, by mercy of Shah Abbas.	King Bagrat VII
King of Kings of Kartli, by will of God, by order of Shah Abbas.	King Simon II
King of Kings, Suzerain and Sovereign of Kartli, the lord of the principalities, possessor of the crown, clothed and adorned in purple, possessor of the scepter, King Giorgi, son of the great and illustrious sovereign, Vakhtang V.	King George XI
King and Sovereign of Kartli, Lord of all Georgia.	King Vakhtang VI
Queen of Queens.	Queen Tamar II

=== Sovereigns of Kakheti ===
Style	Sovereign
King and Sovereign of Kakheti, Shahanshah and Shirvanshah of the Kartlians, the Kakhetians, and the Armenians, absolute king of all Georgia, son of King of Kings Giorgi, crowned by God and distinguished King of Kings, absolute ruler and sovereign of the lands and territories of the East and the North, the Lord.	King Levan
King of Kings, Suzerain and Sovereign of Kakheti.	King Alexander II
King and Sovereign of Kakheti.	King Teimuraz I
King of Imereti and Kakheti.	King Archil II
King of Kings, Suzerain and Sovereign of Kakheti.	King Heraclius I
King of Kings, Sovereign of Kakheti, son of Great King and High Sovereign of Iran.	King David II
King of Kings, Sovereign of Kakheti, Beglarbeg of Yerevan, Lord of Shamshadin and Qazax.	King Constantine II
King of Kings, Suzerain and Sovereign of Kartli, Kakheti, Lord of Qazax and Borchali.	King Teimuraz II

=== Sovereigns of Imereti ===
Style	Sovereign
King of Kings, Suzerain and Sovereign of the Abkhazians, Iberians, Ranis, Kakhetians and Armenians, Shahanshah and Shirvanshah, of all the East and the West, the South and the North, of both two thrones and kingdoms.	King Alexander II
King of Kings and the Sovereign of the Abkhazians, Iberians, Ranis, Kakhetians and Armenians, Shahanshah and Shirvanshah, of the East and the West.	King Bagrat III
King of Kings, Suzerain and Sovereign of the Abkhazians, Iberians, Ranis, Kakhetians and Armenians, Shahanshah and Shirvanshah, of all the East and the West, the South and the North, of both two kingdoms and countries, the High King, Godly anointed and invincible, the most excellent King of all, of the most brilliant purple crown, son of Great, all-powerful and invincible King of Kings.	King George II
King of Kings, the Sovereign of both two thrones.	King Levan
King of Kings, of the Abkhazians, Iberians, Kakhetians, Armenians, Shahanshah and Shirvanshah, of all the East and the West, the South and the North, the Sovereign of both two thrones and countries, Godly given and anointed, great and invincible, the most excellent King of all, of the brilliant sceptre and a purple crown.	King Rostom
King of Kings, the Sovereign, of the Abkhazians, Iberians, Ranis, Kakhetians, Armenians, Shahanshah and Shirvanshah of all the other kings and countries, strong and invincible, supreme by God and unyielding by God.	King George III
King of Kings, the Sovereign.	King Alexander III
King of Imereti and Kakheti.	King Archil II
King of Kings, the King.	King Alexander V
King of Kings, Suzerain and Sovereign of all Imereti.	King Solomon I
King of Kings of all Imereti.	King David II
King of all Imeretians.	King Solomon II

=== Sovereigns of Kartli—Kakheti ===
Style	Sovereign
King of Kartli, Kakheti and all Georgia, successor sovereign and lord of Samtskhe-Saatabago, the mtavari of Qazax, Borchali, Shamshadin, Qax, Shaki, Shirvan, sovereign and ruler of Ganja and Erivan.	King Heraclius II
King of all Georgia, King of all Kartli, Kakheti and all the other lands, the Lord.	King George XII

== See also ==
- Georgian Crown Jewels
- Monarchism in Georgia

== Notes ==
1. A custom dictated that the new monarch should have had a biological connection to the existing dynasty, in part because kingly pharnah was the prerogative of certain families. King Pharnajom unwisely abandoned Georgian polytheism thus losing the kingship.
2. Kartli and Eguri were known in the classical antiquity as Iberia and Colchis respectively.
3. "Iberians" refers specifically to Kartvelians/Georgians. The term Iberia/Iberian would undergo a transformation, its "all-Georgian" reach would be extended by the Bagrationi monarchs and their contemporaries.
4. Per Stele of Vespasian.
5. Per Fasti Ostienses.
6. This title entered the style in spite to the contemporary Muslim laqab, the Sword of Islam and Sword of Allah. The title was pointedly militant and meant "Defender of Christianity" (Messiah i.e. Jesus Christ). David IV was the first Georgian king to assume the title "Sword of the Messiah".
7. These titles entered the style from Persian shah and was motivated by the aggressive expansionist policies of the Georgian monarchs in and beyond the region. The inclusion of Shirvanshah (lit. the shah/king of Shirvan) and Shahanshah (lit. the shah of shahs/King of kings) in style by the Georgian monarchs was an usurpation of Islamic and Sasanid political ideals. These titles were specifically directed against Persian dynasties. George III was the first Georgian king to assume these titles. They were afforded mostly last place in the style, following the "King of the Armenians" title. They later on would get corrupted, and original meaning be forgotten.
8. The Kingdom of Abkhazia was afforded first place in the style as a memory of sequence of acquisition of authority by King Bagrat III, from being King of Abkhazia first and later on king of all-Georgia. The Georgian royal court was inspired by the Byzantine model of rule of law and the continued rendering of Abkhazia to the first place in the style of the Bagrationi kings was largely due to legal considerations. Also, as Abkhazia was under heavy Byzantine influence, the Georgian monarchs wanted to raise the status of the western region to such a high level to reflect the importance of this area to the Georgian realm. The court would have set up the majority of the royal residences mostly in the western regions of the kingdom, in Abkhazia and Imereti.
9. Queen Tamar and Queen Rusudan were not afforded title "Sword of the Messiah" but "Champion of the Messiah". This circumstance doubtlessly reflect the fact that Tamar and Rusudan, although they were the mepe, they were not an actual heads of the army and battlefield leaders, by virtue of their gender. It is noteworthy that Tamar was never depicted on frescos with a sword. Despite the fact that The Georgian Chronicles explicitly state that when Tamar was recrowned after his father's death, "all by one consent joined in raising to Tamar her father's sword, bestowed on her at the same time as her father's throne", still none of the depictions of the queen show her carrying the sword. The chronicle would explain this by stressing Tamar's hatred of violence.
10. The title "King of the Armenians" entered the style after King David IV annexed Kingdom of Tashir-Dzoraget in 1118, or after he captured Ani in 1124.
11. Where the coins of his father, George II, and grandfather, Bagrat IV, had slavishly imitated Byzantine examples, David IV had taken over the imagery to glorify himself, instead of Mother of God. Per Bagrationi symbolism Virgin Mary was a patron saint of all Georgia, her cult being established as the governing royal image of the whole kingdom. The coins issued by his forebears depicted a bust of the Mother of God on the obverse and inscriptions proclaiming the Byzantine titles of the kings on the reverse.
12. Tamar's choice of terminology in Arabic derives from Islamic coins and was similar to known examples of coins minted by Mamluks in the thirteenth century. Tamar's royal imagery had to cope with the diverse nature of her empire as it had to accommodate both Christian and Muslim subjects, as well as many separate territories. Her great-grandfather, King David IV, right after his victory in the Battle of Didgori and military reconquest of Tbilisi, would initiate universal minting of coins in Arabic for trade and economic reasons. According to Ibn al-Azraq al-Fariqi and Sibt ibn al-Jawzi, David IV would mint the coins with his name alongside names of Allah and Muhammad.
13. A shift toward an Islamic expression of power can be found in the adoption of new royal titles during the reign of King George III, when he, in 1170, added to his titles those of Shirvanshah and Shahanshah. This was the first evidence of these titles being adopted by a Georgian king and must have been taken over from the Shaddadids, whom George had defeated in 1161. Reign of George III can be seen to mark a decisive shift in the nature of Georgian power. Any expression of inferiority to Byzantine Empire had been ended by his grandfather, King David IV, who abandoned the use of any Byzantine titles, but took over Byzantine forms of imagery to promote himself as an independent power. Now George was establishing this more clearly by usurping titles of his rivals into his own as an expression of his dominance over them.
14. The title "King of Ranis and Kakhetians" officially entered the style after King David IV annexed First Kingdom of Kakheti in 1104.
15. Per royal charter sent to Nicolaes Witsen, a mayor of Amsterdam.
16. According to David Marshall Lang, the British Museum acquired the coin from William Cole, 3rd Earl of Enniskillen. The coin's museum number is 1857,1226.7. Its diameter is 35 millimetres and it weighs 10.8 grammes. It is suggested that coin had been minted at Ani after David's conquest of the city.
17. The "two thrones and/or kingdoms" refers to the de facto split and fracture of the unity of the monarchy during the Mongol invasions and establishment of the Kingdom of Western Georgia. The unified kingdom will ultimately collapse de jure in 1490. Some of the kings would continue including them in style even after an official fragmentation of the monarchy.
18. Gurgen was the first Georgian monarch to assume the title "King of Kings". The term would become absolute and universal during and after King David IV. Gurgen's title is elaborated by the Bagratid-commissioned chronicler Sumbat Davitis Dze, explaining him being a king, and a father, of another king. Gurgen ruled the Kingdom of the Iberians, while his son, Bagrat, led the Kingdom of the Abkhazians.

== Bibliography ==
- The Georgian Chronicles, Life of the Georgian kings, royal annals
- Eastmond, A. (1998) Royal imagery in medieval Georgia, Pennsylvania State University, ISBN 978-0-271-01628-3
- Zagareli, A. (1898) Gramoty i drugie istoricheskie dokumenty XVIII stoletia, otnosieschia k Gruzii: Vol. 1, Gruzinskie teksty s 1765 po 1774 god, Komissiia pechataniia gosudarstvennykh gramot i dogovorov, Tip. V. Kirshbauma, Moscow
- Javakhishvili, I. (1929) History of the Georgian Justice, Vol. II, Tiflis
- Rapp, S. H. Jr. (1997) Imagining History at the Crossroads: Persia, Byzantium, and the Architects of the Written Georgian Past, Volume II, University of Michigan
- Rapp, S. H. Jr. (2014) Caucasia and Byzantine Culture, Edited by Dean Sakel, Ankara
- Rapp, S. H. Jr. (2016) The Sasanian World Through Georgian Eyes, Caucasia and the Iranian Commonwealth in Late Antique Georgian Literature, Sam Houston State University, USA, Routledge, ISBN 9781472425522
- Rayfield, D. (2013) Edge of Empires: A History of Georgia, Reaktion Books, ISBN 9781780230702
- Bakhtadze, M. (2015) Georgian titles of the Bagrationi rulers of Tao-Klarjeti, Institute of the Georgian History, Tbilisi State University, ISSN 1987-9970
- Khakhanov, A. (1895) Title, coronation and regalia of the Georgian kings, Tbilisi
- Takaishvili, E. (1909) The Georgian Antiquities, Georgian History and Ethnography, Volume II, Tbilisi
- Takaishvili, E. (1910) The Georgian Antiquities, Georgian History and Ethnography, Volume III, Tbilisi
- Kakabadze, S. (1921) Diplomata ecclesiastica Georgiae occidentalis, Monumenta Georgica, V, Tbilisi State University
- Dundua, T. & Tavadze, L. (2017) Imperial Titulature of the Georgian Kings, Tbilisi State University
- Silogava, V. (1984) Georgian Historical Documents of IX-XIII centuries, Vol. I, Metsniereba Publishing, Tbilisi
- Kartvelishvili, T. Jojua, T. Baindurashvili, Kh. Gelashvili, I. Gogoladze, T. & Shaorshadze, M. (2019) Sources of the XVII century about the Kings of Kartli and Kakheti, Vol. I, Tbilisi, ISBN 978-9941-9677-8-8
- Dolidze, I. (1965) Georgian monuments of Law, V. II, Metsniereba Publishing, Tbilisi
- Paghava, I. (2012) Rediscovering the Specie of Davit IV the Builder (1089-1125), King of Kings and Sword of Messiah, Eds. Bruno Callegher and Arianna D’Ottone, Trieste
- Paghava, I. (2021) Copper Coin with the Effigy of David the Builder and the Titulary of Georgian Monarchs, V. VIII, Mkhedari Publishing
- Paghava, I. & Chanishvili, E. (2021) Numismatic history of David IV the Builder: Money Circulation, Issued Coinage, and Monetary Policy, Tsereteli Institute of Oriental Studies of the Ilia State University, ISSN 2587-4780
- Tavadze, L. (2012) Byzantine imperial style in Georgia, Tbilisi State University, The Institute of the Georgian History, Tbilisi
- Gamkrelidze, G. (2010) War and Arms in Iberia and Colchis, Sulakauri Publishers, Tbilisi, ISBN 978-99941-15-242-9
- Catalogue of Georgian Numismatics; CoGN (2013) Tbilisi State University, Shota Rustaveli National Science Foundation
- Brosset, Marie-Félicité (1851). "Quatrième rapport.". Rapports sur un voyage archéologique dans la Géorgie et dans l'Arménie: exécuté en 1847-1848 sous les auspices du prince Vorontzof, leutenant du Caucase (in French). St.-Pétersbourg: l'Académie impériale des sciences.
- TITUS (Online Version) Historical Materials from Southern Georgia, Text collection: HMSG, XV century archives
