= Unification of the Kingdom of Georgia =

10th-century Caucasian political movement

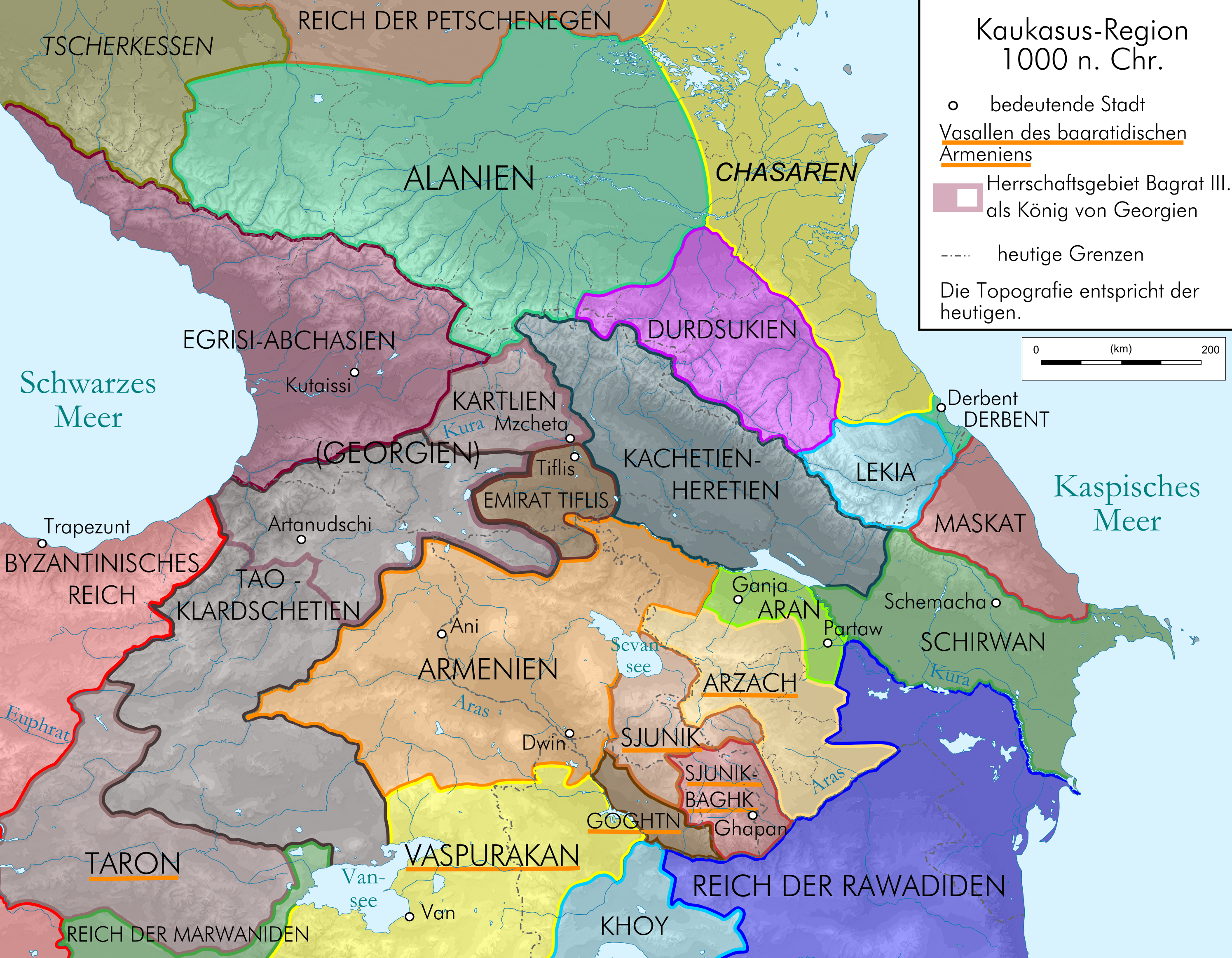
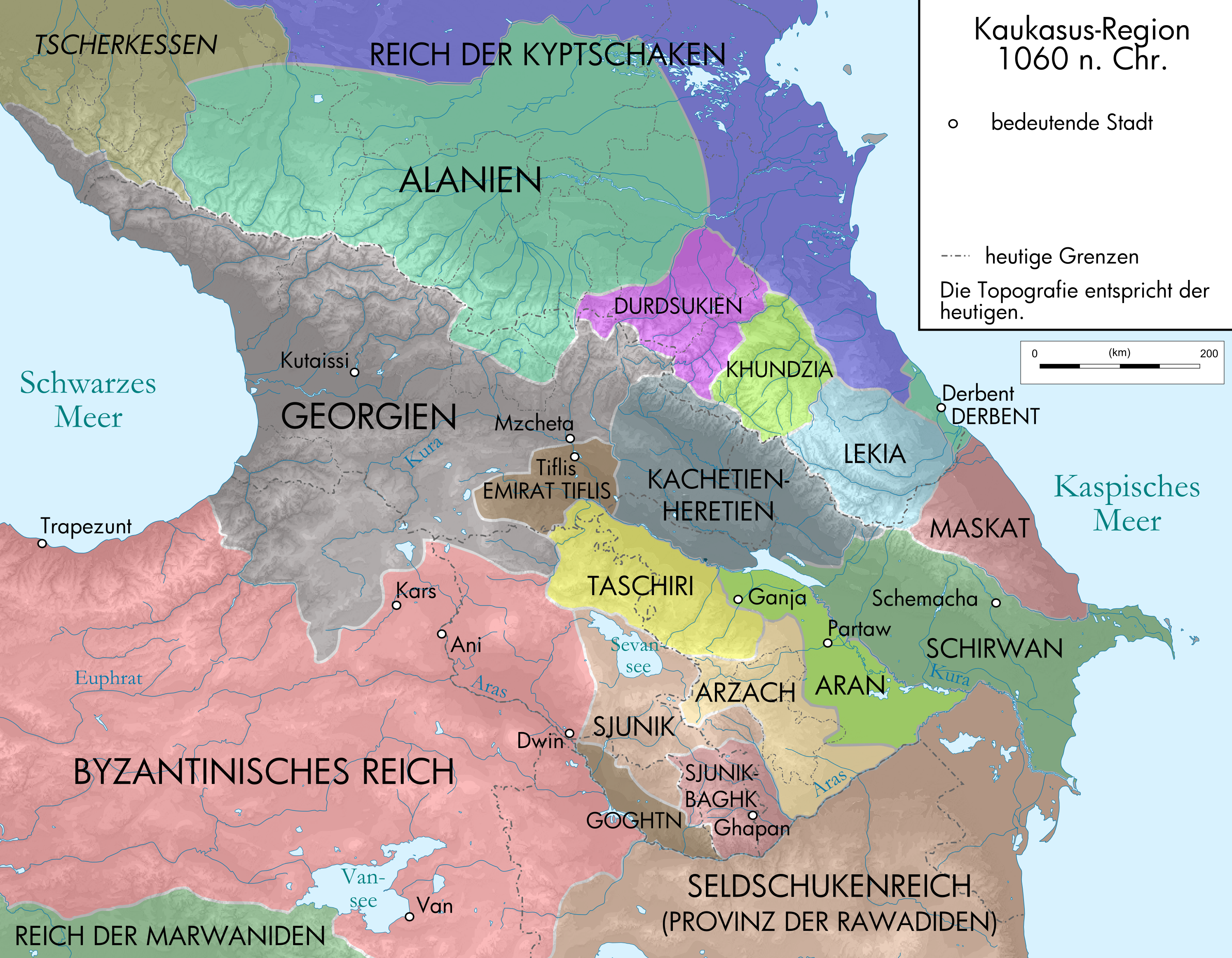
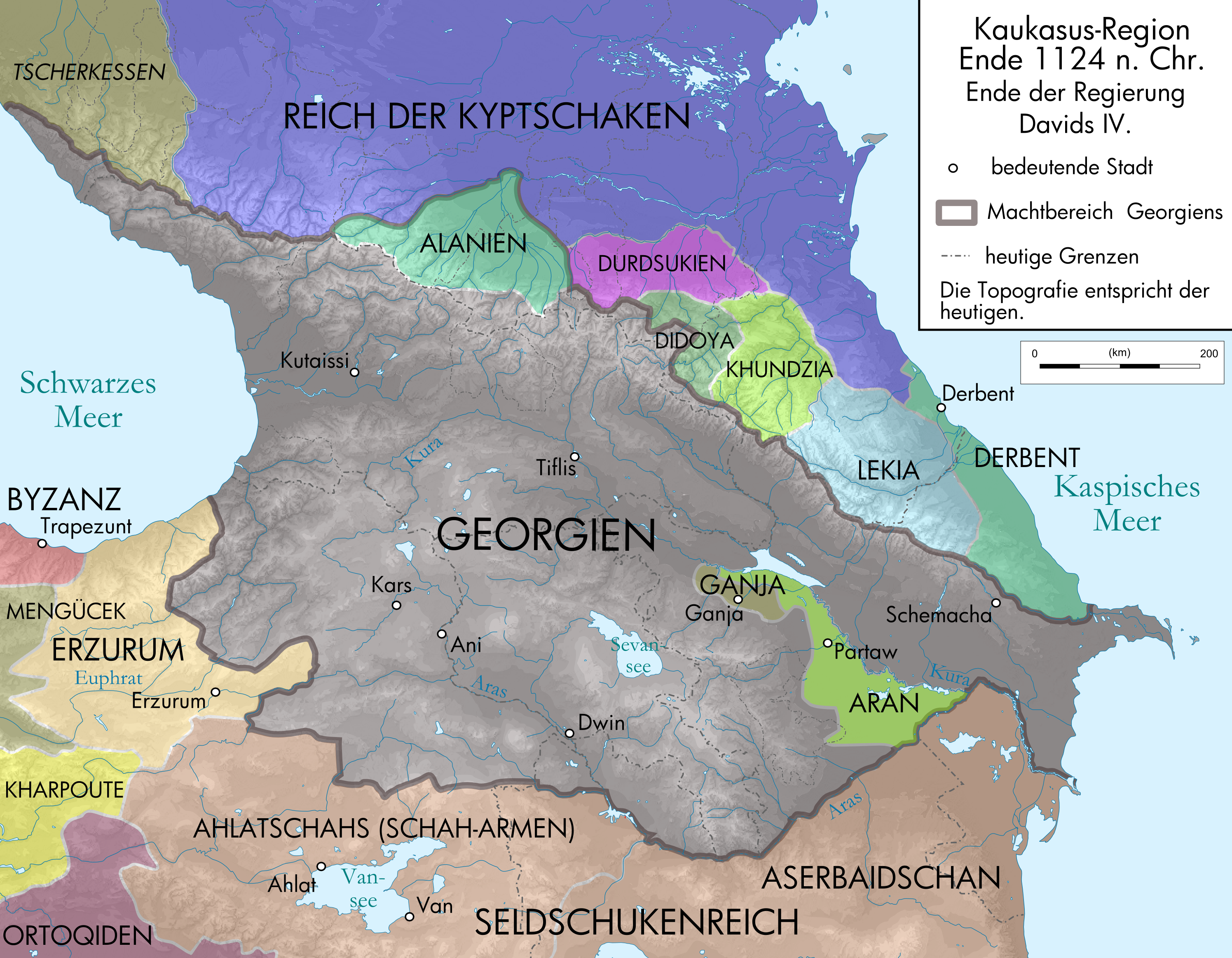
- Map of the Caucasus in 1000, 1060 and 1124
- Native name: საქართველოს სამეფოს გაერთიანება (Georgian)
- Date: c. 1008 (first phase); 1104—1122 (second phase)
- Location: Transcaucasia
- Participants: First phase: Kingdom of the Iberians (Note: Also known as the Kingdom of Tao-Klarjeti.); Principality of Tao; Kingdom of Abkhazia; Duchy of Kartli; Principality of Kakheti; Kingdom of Hereti; Second phase: Kingdom of Kakheti-Hereti; Emirate of Tbilisi; Kingdom of Tashir-Dzoraget
- Outcome: Kingdom of Georgia established; Georgian Golden Age; Byzantine–Georgian wars over theme of Iberia; Georgian–Shaddadid wars and collapse of Shaddadids; Georgian–Seljuk wars and collapse of the Great Seljuk rule in the Caucasus; Establishment of Empire of Trebizond

The unification of the Kingdom of Georgia (Georgian: საქართველოს სამეფოს გაერთიანება, romanized: sakartvelos samepos gaertianeba) was the 10th-century political movement that resulted in the consolidation of various Georgian crowns into a single realm with centralized government in 1008, the Kingdom of Georgia, or Sakartvelo. It was originally initiated by the powerful local aristocracy of the eristavs, due to centuries-long power struggles and aggressive wars of succession between the Georgian monarchs, arising from their independent ruling traditions of classical antiquity and their Hellenistic-era monarchical establishments in Colchis and Iberia.

The initiative was supported by David III the Great of the Bagrationi dynasty, the most powerful ruler in the Caucasus at the time, who would put prince royal Bagrat, his kin and foster-son, on the Iberian throne, who would eventually be crowned King of all-Georgia. David's Bagratid successors would become the champions of national unification, just like the Rurikids or the Capetians, but despite their enthusiasm, some of the Georgian polities that had been targeted for unification did not join the unification freely and would actively fight against it throughout this process, mostly seeking help and support from the Byzantine Empire and the Abbasid Caliphate. Even though the 1008 unification of the realm would unite most of western and central Georgian lands, the process would continue to the east, and eventually reach its total completion under King David IV the Builder. This unprecedented political unification of lands and the meteoric rise of Bagrationi power would inaugurate the Georgian Golden Age and creation of the only medieval pan-Caucasian empire, attaining its greatest geographical extent and dominating the entire Caucasus in the 11th, 12th and 13th centuries.

The centralizing power of the crown started to weaken in the 14th century, and even though the tide turned back under King George V the Brilliant, the reunification turned out to be short-lived; the unified realm would evaporate after invasions by the Mongols and Timur that would result in its total collapse in the 15th century.

== Background ==
The Sasanian Empire dismantled the eastern Georgian monarchy and annexed the Kingdom of Iberia in 580, making it a Sasanian province ruled by the Persian marzbans and later, demoted in rank, by native Iberian princes. Even though the Iberian presiding princes would seek and receive some support from the Byzantine emperors, their capabilities were still limited. In the 8th century Arabs would invade Georgian lands and establish Emirate of Tbilisi in the central-eastern Georgia, while Georgian dynastic princes would flee to Uplistsikhe and Kakheti. In 888, Adarnase IV would restore the Georgian kingship in the name of the Kingdom of the Iberians, a monarchy that was concentrated on the historical southern Georgian lands of Tao and Klarjeti. The western Georgian Kingdom of the Abkhazians would be experiencing the dynastic succession crisis, while warmongering and emerging easternmost Georgian power of Principality of Kakheti would be in constant conflict with the Iberian neighbors. At the same time, the Georgian Orthodoxy was expanding and reaching the most eastern regions by 950, when Queen Dinar of Hereti renounced monophysitism, thus making all Georgian polities unified ecclesiastically, making political union inevitable. This was the very time when the concept and a compelling definition of Georgia was introduced by the writer and ecclesiastical lawyer Giorgi Merchule in 951 in his "Vita of Gregory of Khandzta".

ქართლად ფრიადი ქუეყანაჲ აღირაცხების, რომელსაცა შინა ქართულითა ენითა ჟამი შეიწირვის და ლოცვაჲ ყოველი აღესრულების.
We can consider as Greater Georgia wherever mass and prayers are said in Georgian [language].

Giorgi Merchule advanced the definition of the nation based upon religious and linguistic considerations. This trend would also continue under Georgian Sabaite monk John Zosimus who would attribute divine, unique and sacred role to the Georgian language, that, as he believed, would be a tongue to be used on the Last Judgment. The Georgian liturgical language was a national unifier when political and cultural unity was still very elusive. The Church's active participation should not be neglected as an ecclesiastical jurisdiction was extended to some regions prior to the establishment of political hegemony. An all-Georgian realm construct was also solidified with Georgian possessing its own script. Eventually, with an immense ideological support from the clerics, the Georgian unification would come from a resurgent Bagrationi family based in the Kingdom of the Iberians and King George II of Abkhazia, and his policy of unifying Georgian polities by interdynastic marriages and intrigues, resulting in his daughter, princess Gurandukht of Abkhazia marrying Gurgen, King of Kings of the Iberians, bearing Bagrat, the first all-Georgian king.

== Initiative and David III ==
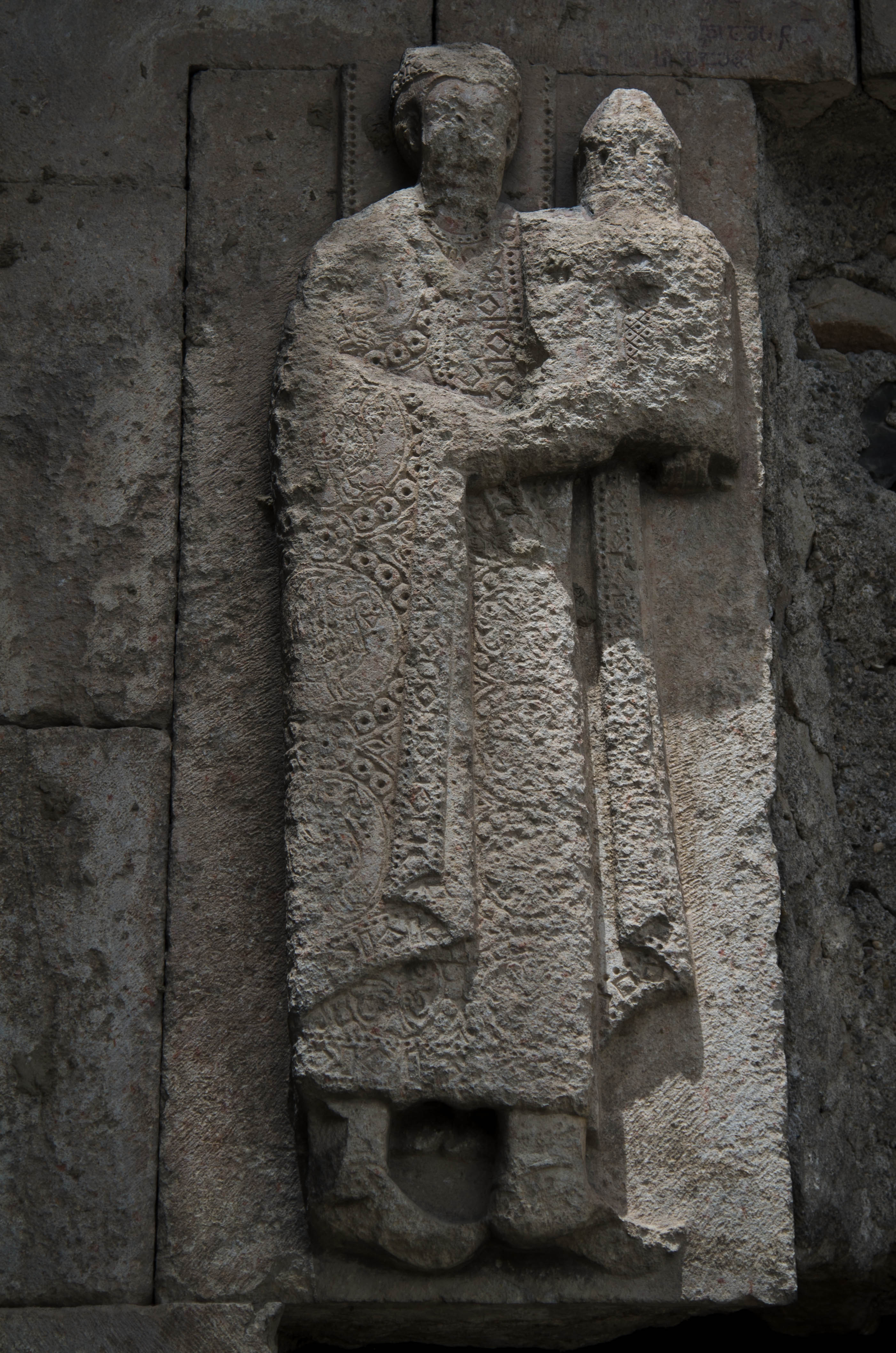
Under David III, his ancestral land of Tao became the political and ecclesiastic centre of Georgia. He was the first Georgian ruler since Sassanid times to mint coins. David III, childless, took advice from a powerful feudal lord of neighboring Kartli to lead and pave the way for Georgian unification.

Georgian monarchies continued being torn apart by their local rulers and rival states. Right after yet another attack by the Principality of Kakheti on Iberian citadel of Uplistsikhe, part of the aristocracy led by one the most powerful and instrumental Georgian feudal lords, the eristavi, Ivane Marushisdze, who envisaged a unified Georgia with centralized monarchy, addressed and urged childless Prince of Tao, David III, to end the chaos by taking control of all central Georgian lands and its core region of Kartli and to put his kin, prince Bagrat on throne, thus laying future foundation for a unification process of various lands into a single crown. If David III were to designate Bagrat his heir, Marushisdze reasoned, the extensive realm of David would be merged with lands of Bagrat, thus creating a formidable all-Georgian enterprise.

მაშინ მოვიდეს კახნი და მოადგეს უფლისციხესა. და იყო მათ ჟამთა ერისთავი, ქართლისა ივანე მარუშისძე, კაცი ძლიერი და ერმრავალი. ამან წარავლინა მოციქული წინაშე დავით კურაპალატისა; აწჳა, რათა გამოილაშქროს ძალითა მისითა, აღიღოს ქართლი: ანუ დაიმჭიროს თჳთ, ანუ უბოძოს ბაგრატს, ძესა გურგენისსა, ასულისწულსა გიორგი აფხაზთა მეფისასა, რომელსა ეყოდა დედულად აფხაზეთი და ქართლი. ესევე ივანე მარუშისძე ეძებდა ბაგრატს მეფედ.
And then the Kakhetians invaded, and approached Uplistsikhe. And there was eristavi of Kartli, Ivane Marushisdze, a man of strength and with abundance of warriors. He sent an apostle to David [III] kouropalates; he told him to invade and conquer Kartli with his strength, and take it; hold it, and give it to Bagrat, son of Gurgen [King of the Iberians], son of a daughter of George [II], King of the Abkhazians, who should own Abkhazia and Kartli. Ivane Marushisdze saw Bagrat as a King.

The bet of aristocracy on David III was no surprise as he was the major power in Caucasian and Byzantine commonwealth. David rose from an obscure non-royal branch of the Bagrationi family to glory thanks to his military valor and skills. His unique position was the perfect pretext for the Georgian aristocracy to push David for unification. David accepted the aristocratic call. In 975 David adopted prince Bagrat and invaded Kartli. David took young Bagrat, his biological parents Gurgen and Gurandukht, to Uplistsikhe, then besieged by Kakhetian forces. The Kakhetians realized that all western and southern Georgia had now united against them. They had to accept David’s presentation of Bagrat as his "heir".

შემოკრიბნა ქართველნი აზნაურნი და უბრძანა. ესე არს მკჳდრი ტაოსი, ქართლისა და აფხაზეთისა, შვილი და გაზრდილი ჩემი, და მე ვარ მოურავი ამისი და თანაშემწე; ამას დაემორჩილენით ყოველნი. და დაყვნა დღენი მცირედნი და წარვიდა ტაოს.
He [David] gathered all Georgian aznauris and ordered. He [Bagrat] is an heir of Tao, Kartli and Abkhazia, my son whom I brought up, I am his governor and helper; all of you will obey him. And he [David] stayed there couple of days, and left for Tao.

David acted decisively to ensure Bagrat also inherited the Abkhazian throne. By his mother Gurandukht, young Bagrat was nephew and heir to the blind and childless king Theodosius III of Abkhazia. A little later that same year, in 975, three years prior even to the death of Theodosius III, with the support of local aristocrats, David invited King Smbat II of Armenia to accompany him, Bagrat and Gurandukht to Kutaisi, Abkhazia's capital, where Bagrat was solemnly anointed king of Abkhazia, as Bagrat II. Theodosius remained king only in name and was sent to Tao, David's domain, to live out until his death.

იწყო განგებად და საურავად და განმართებად ყოველსა საქმესა მსგავსად პაპისა მისისა, დიდისა გიორგი მეფისა, გინა თუ უმეტესადრე ვთქუა, რამეთუ ყოვლითურთ მიემსგავსებოდა ქცევასა გამზრდელისა თჳსისასა, დიდისა მეფისა დავით კურაპალატისასა.
He [Bagrat] started to rule per all the deeds of his grandfather, Great King George [II of Abkhazia], to say more, he was much alike of the behavior of his foster-father, Great King David [III] kouropalates.

== Unified realm ==
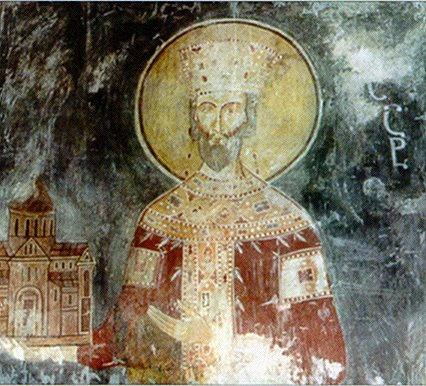
Bagrat's reign was characterized with ruthlessness, energy and luck, that he had outdone even King Vakhtang I, as after 500 years, Georgia was united, centralized and free of foreign domination. Aged 52, Bagrat died in 1014. His son George, just like himself, would be a boy king ascending to the unified Georgian throne.

David III was ruthless and followed aggressive expansion of his realm. The conspirators poisoned his communion wine on the eve of Good Friday, in 1000 or 1001. Whoever hired the murderers, emperor Basil II, or even resentful Georgian nobles, the legacy of David's unification process in the history of Georgian statehood was enormous. Prince Bagrat was made King of Abkhazia officially in 978. When his father, Gurgen, died in 1008, Bagrat’s claim to the Abkhazian and Iberian thrones, was undisputed. He became the first ruler of all-Georgian monarchy, as King Bagrat III, and officially styled as the "King of the Abkhazians and Iberians". It was only a matter of time before monarchies of Kakheti and Hereti also submitted to his unified Georgian realm, while the emirate of Tbilisi lingered on.

და შემდგომად ამისა რაოდენთამე წელთა გარდაიცვალა ესე გურგენ მეფეთ-მეფე, მამა ამის ბაგრატ მეფისა და ძე ბაგრატ მეფე რეგუნისა. მოიწყუნა და განაგნა ყოველნი საქმენი აფხაზეთისანი. ურჩნი თჳსნი შეცვალნა დიდებისაგან და ადგილთა მათთა დაადგინნა ერთგულნი და მოსწრაფედ მორჩილნი ბრძანებათა მისთა. და წარემატა ყოველთა მეფეთა აფხაზეთისა და ქართლისათა ყოვლითა განგებითა. და განამრავლა ლაშქარი თჳსი უმეტეს ყოვლისა ჟამისა. ბაგრატ მეფემან კურაპალატმან დაიპყრა ყოველი კავკასია თჳთმპყრობელობითა ჯიქეთითგან ვიდრე გურგენადმდე, და ადარბადაგანი და შირვანი მოხარკე ყო სომხითისა ჴელმწიფებითა. მეფე სპარსთა მეგობარ და ერთგულ ყო სიბრძნითა და ძლიერებითა თჳსითა, უფროს სახლეულთა თჳსთასა, და ბერძენთა მეფესაცა შიში აქუნდა ამისი ყოვლადვე.
And later in couple of years died King of Kings Gurgen, father of King Bagrat, and son of King Bagrat [II] Regueni. He [Bagrat III] organized all the matters of Abkhazia. He changed the rebellious nobles and put in place loyal and fast doing servants of his orders. And he succeeded all the deeds of the kings of Abkhazia and Kartli. And multiplied he his army of all times. King Bagrat the kouropalates conquered all the Caucasus with his sovereignty, from Jiketi to Gorgan, and made Adurbadagan and Shirvan as his tributaries through sovereign rule over Somkhiti. He [Bagrat], with his wisdom and strength, made the King of the Persians as his loyal friend, and the King of the Greeks [Byzantines] was greatly afraid of him [Bagrat] too.

Bagrat III, being precociously far-sighted and ruthless, would continue the expansion of his unified realm and the suppression of the rebellious separatist aristocracy, including purging his own cousins so no rival Bagrationi could ever claim the Georgian throne.

== See also ==
- Style of the Georgian sovereign
- Collapse of the Kingdom of Georgia

== Notes ==
1. The term "Sakartvelo" (i.e. "the place inhabited by Kartvelians") literally means "all-Georgian kingdom", "all Georgia", "whole Georgia" or "Greater Georgia". Term is still used in modern times as the official name of the country. The origins of the term is still debated but the name was used way before 1008 Georgian unification and political centralization and it used to describe "neo-Kartli", "Greater Kartli" or "Kartli-in-exile", referring to those south-western lands of Kartli in and around Byzantine Anatolia where Georgians lived in exile during the Arab invasion of Kartli. The term was coined in pre-Bagratid times. The traditional 11th century dating of the term's invention is incorrect, even though in later centuries "Sakartvelo" did acquire the meaning of "all-Georgia" as a single political and socio-cultural entity. The term was embraced and promoted by the Bagrationi monarchs and their chroniclers for celebration of their dynastic success. The earliest use of "Sakartvelo" dates c. 800 in the works of Juansheriani describing the events of Marwan II's invasions of Georgian lands. The term "Sakartvelo" attained widespread universal usage in the second half of the 13th century.
2. An exertion of aristocratic power of the eristavs in medieval Georgia in king's election was dependent on their choice and support. There was a major balance of power between the king and his nobles. The Georgian kings did not have the universal, absolute power of the Byzantine emperors, and they had none of the centralized structures of government that allowed Byzantium to be ruled directly from Constantinople. Instead, the Georgian court had to travel around the realm all year, and royal power had to be negotiated or fought for with the local aristocracy. The eristavs played an important role in the Georgian monarchy since pre-Christian times, established by the first foundational king Pharnavaz I, so their position in the hierarchy would legitimize and explain their local power. Even though the king was the center of power in the kingdom, the eristavs were in close physical contact with their king, unlike the Byzantine model where the emperor enjoyed inaccessibility to other mortals and their untouchability. An ultimate acceptance of the king by the local aristocracy as the primary source of power and authority was very significant. The royal power would derive directly from the king, but was then shared with the eristavs. During the royal coronation ceremony of a new Georgian monarch, specifically the eristavs were the ones who would be girding the royal sword of state, thus investing the king with his symbols of power.
3. The Georgian kingship and royal authority is an ancient institution that originated during the Hellenistic period. The Georgian monarchy was very flexible, at times interspersing, however, strongly dynastic, and had more in common with ancient Iranian models of authority than of Roman or Byzantine. Four dynasties dominated the Georgian realm, prior to unification or after, the Pharnavazids (299 BC-AD 189), the Arsacids (189-284), the Chosroids (284-580) and finally, the Bagratids (888-early nineteenth century). The Bagrationi monarchs would hegemonize the Georgian political scene for a thousand years, down to annexation of realm by the Russian Empire in the 19th century.
4. David's armies would rescue the Byzantine emperor Basil II the Bulgar Slayer and the empire's Anatolian possessions from the rebel Bardas Skleros. David, with another Georgian, the hiero-strategos ("monk-warrior") John Tornike would lead 12,000 Georgian cavalrymen with Byzantine and Armenian soldiers at the Battle of Pankaleia defeating the emperor's rebels. Basil II would later reward David with a life-long, if not hereditary, grant of the vast lands in the south-eastern Anatolia.

== Bibliography ==
- Rapp Jr., Stephen H. (2016). The Sasanian World Through Georgian Eyes, Caucasia and the Iranian Commonwealth in Late Antique Georgian Literature. Sam Houston State University and Routledge. ISBN 9781472425522.
- Rapp Jr., Stephen H. (October 2000). "Sumbat Davitʿis-dze and the Vocabulary of Political Authority in the Era of Georgian Unification". Journal of the American Oriental Society. 120 (4): 570. doi:10.2307/606617.
- Rapp Jr., Stephen H.; Crego, Paul (2018). Languages and Cultures of Eastern Christianity: Georgian. Routledge. ISBN 978-1-351-92326-2.
- Rapp Jr., Stephen H. (2003). Studies in Medieval Georgian Historiography: Early Texts and Eurasian Contexts. Peeters Publishers. ISBN 978-90-429-1318-9.
- Rapp Jr., Stephen H (2017), "Georgia before the Mongols", in Ludden, David (ed.), Oxford Research Encyclopedia of Asian History (1 ed.), New York, NY: Oxford University Press, doi:10.1093/ACREFORE/9780190277727.013.282, ISBN 978-0-19-785173-9
- Rayfield, Donald (2013). Edge of Empires: A History of Georgia. Reaktion Books. ISBN 9781780230702.
- Suny, Ronald Grigor (1994). The Making of the Georgian Nation, Second Edition. Indiana University Press. ISBN 978-0-253-20915-3.
- The Georgian Chronicles, Life of the Georgian kings, royal annals
- Eastmond, Antony (1998). Royal imagery in medieval Georgia. Pennsylvania State University. ISBN 0-271-01628-0.
- Melikishvili, Giorgi (1973). საქართველოს ისტორიის ნარკვევები : რვა ტომად [History of Georgia in Eight Volumes]. Vol. 2. Soviet Georgia.
