= Rev I =

King of Iberia from 189 to 216

King of Iberia
- Reign: 189–216
- Predecessor: Amazasp II
- Successor: Vache
- Spouse: Sephelia
- Issue: Vache
- Dynasty: Arsacid dynasty
- Father: Vologases II
- Mother: daughter of Pharasmanes III

Rev I the Just (Georgian: რევ I მართალი, romanized: rev I martali) was a king (mepe) of Iberia (natively known as Kartli, i.e., eastern Georgia) from 189 to 216. His reign inaugurated the local Arsacid dynasty.

The name "Rev" derives from Middle Iranian Rēw, itself from the Avestan adjective raēva, meaning "rich, splendid, opulent".

He is known exclusively from the medieval Georgian annals which make him a son of the king of Armenia, whom the historians Cyril Toumanoff and Stephen H. Rapp identifies with the Arsacid, Vologases II (r. 180–191). Rev was enthroned by the rebellious Iberian nobles who deposed his maternal uncle, Amazasp II, last of the Pharnabazids. Rev is reported to have married a "Greek" princess Sephelia who is said to have brought an idol of Aphrodite to Iberia, but there is no indication of a local cult of this Greek goddess having ever existing.

The Georgian chronicle Life of the Kings says that Rev, albeit pagan, was sympathetic to the doctrines of Christianity and came to be known as martali, or "the Just" for his patronage of a local embryonic Christian community. Toumanoff illustrated that this sobriquet is a direct translation of dikaios, an epithet frequently used in the titulature of the Arsacid kings of Parthia.

== Sources ==
- Rapp, Stephen H. (2003). Studies in Medieval Georgian Historiography: Early Texts and Eurasian Contexts. Peeters. ISBN 978-2-87723-723-9.
- Rapp, Stephen H. (2014). The Sasanian World through Georgian Eyes: Caucasia and the Iranian Commonwealth in Late Antique Georgian Literature. Farnham: Ashgate Publishing. ISBN 978-1-4724-2552-2.
- Russell, James R. (2004). Armenian and Iranian studies. Harvard Armenian Texts and Studies. Vol. 9. Harvard University Press. ISBN 978-0935411195.
- Toumanoff, Cyril (1969). "Chronology of the early kings of Iberia". Traditio. 25. Cambridge University Press: 1–33. doi:10.1017/S0362152900010898. JSTOR 27830864. S2CID 151472930. (registration required)

Preceded by Amazasp II	King of Iberia; 189–216 AD	Succeeded by Vache
