= Ghadana of Armenia =

Queen of Caucasian Iberia and consort to Pharasmanes II

Ghadana of Armenia (fl. 135) was queen consort of Iberia by marriage to Pharasmanes II, and regent during the minority of her grandson Pharasmanes III in 135.

She was an Armenian princess and daughter of King Vologases I. Through her marriage to Pharasmanes II, she became Queen of Caucasian Iberia.

After his death, their son Ghadam ruled for three years. In 135, Ghadam was succeeded by his one-year-old son Pharasmanes III. Ghadana then acted as regent for her grandson because of his youth.
