= Fasti Ostienses =

Calendar of Roman magistrates and events from 49 BC to AD 175

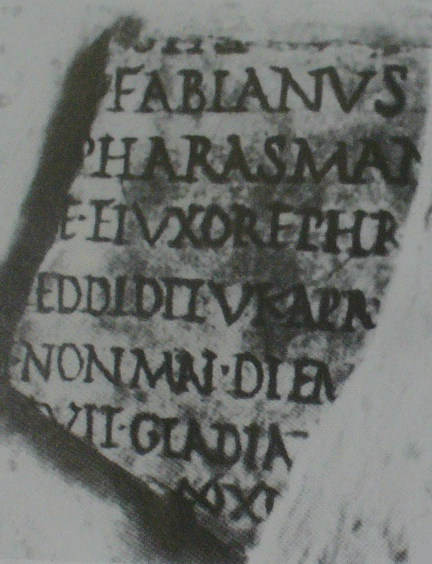
A fragment of the Fasti Ostienses that mentions King Pharasmanes II. PHARASMAN'[ES REX IBERORVM CVM FILIO] E ET VXORE PHR[CVI IMP(ERATOR) ANTONINVS AVG(VSTVS) REGNVM] REDDIDIT Translation: Pharasman[es, the king of Iberia with the son] and his wife Phr[to whom the emp[eror] Antoninus Aug[ustus], the kingdom] restored.

The Fasti Ostienses are a calendar of Roman magistrates and significant events from 49 BC to AD 175, found at Ostia, the principal seaport of Rome. Together with similar inscriptions, such as the Fasti Capitolini and Fasti Triumphales at Rome, the Fasti Ostienses form part of a chronology known as the Fasti Consulares, or Consular Fasti.

The Fasti Ostienses were originally engraved on marble slabs in a public place, either the Ostian forums, or the temple of Vulcan, the tutelary deity of Ostia. The fasti were later dismantled and used as building materials. Since their rediscovery, they have become one of the primary sources for the chronology of the early Roman Empire, along with historians such as Tacitus, Suetonius, and Cassius Dio.

== History ==
The term fasti originally referred to calendars published by the pontifices, indicating the days on which business could be transacted (fasti) and those on which it was prohibited for religious reasons (nefasti). These calendars frequently included lists of the annual magistrates. In many ancient cultures, the most common way to refer to individual years was by the names of the presiding magistrates. The annually-elected consuls were the eponymous magistrates at Rome, and so lists of the consuls going back many years were useful for dating historical events. Over time such lists also became known as fasti.

Located at the mouth of the Tiber, Ostia was the chief seaport of Rome from the earliest period until the third century AD, when it was overtaken by Portus. The Fasti Ostienses were inscribed in a public place somewhere in the city, although precisely where is uncertain; perhaps in the local forum, or on the walls of the temple of Vulcan, the location of which has not been identified. In either case, they were probably superintended by the Pontifex Volkani, the priest of Vulcan at Ostia. The surviving fragments of the Ostienses mention this appointment several times. The carving of the Ostian fasti may have begun as early as the dictatorship of Sulla, in 81 BC, but the earliest surviving portion records the events from 49 to 44 BC. The last extant year is AD 175, but there are many gaps, and most of the surviving years are damaged.

It is not clear at what time the fasti were dismantled for reuse as building material; they may have been abandoned as early as the Severan dynasty, but more likely this occurred following the advent of Christianity as the state religion toward the end of the fourth century, or still later, when the city came under threat from raids from both land and sea during the fifth century. However, from the ninth century to the nineteenth, the old city was effectively abandoned, and regarded largely as a source of material for construction elsewhere.

== Contents ==
For each year, the Ostienses provide a list of the consuls, including both of the ordinares, the consuls who entered office at the beginning of January, and traditionally gave their names to the year, followed by all of the suffecti, consuls who took office following the resignation or death of their predecessors in the course of the year. Under the Republic, consules suffecti were elected only if one of the ordinares died, or was forced to resign. But in imperial times, it became common for the emperors to appoint two, four, or even six pairs of consuls during the course of a year.

Part of the reason for increasing the number of consuls was to show favour to the Roman aristocracy, for whom holding the consulship for even a short period was a great honour; but the more practical reason was to fill the large number of important positions in the imperial bureaucracy that were traditionally held by ex-consuls.

Typically, each pair of consuls would enter office at the beginning, or Kalends, of a month, although sometimes consuls would take office on the Ides or Nones, or on rare occasions between these dates. Most of the emperors held the consulship several times, typically serving as one of the ordinares, and then resigning, often as early as the Ides of January.

In addition to the consuls, the Ostienses listed the local duumviri jure dicundo, the chief magistrates of Ostia, who were also tasked with carrying out the census every fifth year. Prefects are also mentioned in a few years, but these also appear to have been local officials, often bearing the names of the same families who regularly supplied the city's duumvirs.

Inserted between the Roman consuls and Ostian magistrates, the Ostienses describe important occasions, such as events relating to the emperor or the imperial family, the deaths of notable individuals, and the dedication of statues and temples. The main focus is on events at Rome, although several events of local significance to Ostians are also recorded, including the appointment of new Priests of Vulcan, and the donation of congiaria.

Although the surviving portions of the fasti cover a period of nearly two hundred and twenty five years, only about eighty-five years are partially preserved. Moreover, contrary to the Fasti Capitolini, these fasti did not record the consuls' filiations, making prosopography of the Empire more difficult. Nonetheless, the Fasti Ostienses are immensely valuable as a source for the names and chronology of many of the consuls who held office under the empire.

== Transcription ==
The following tables give the magistrates and events from the most recent reconstruction of the Fasti Ostienses. The years provided in the columns on the left are based on modern scholarship; the original inscription does not provide years. Portions of names and text in square brackets have been interpolated. Periods (full stops) have been supplied for abbreviations. Missing text is indicated with an ellipsis in brackets, [...]. These tables use modern conventions for distinguishing between I and J, and between U and V. Otherwise, the names and notes are given as spelled in the fasti.

=== Magistracies ===
- Coss. = consules, consuls
- Suf. = consules suffecti
- IIviri = duumviri, duumvirs
- c. p. q. = censoria potestate quinquennales, with the authority to take the quinquennial census
- Praef. = praefecti, prefects
- p. c. = patronus coloniae, patron of the colony
- p. p. c. = patronus perpetuus coloniae, perpetual patron of the colony
- Kal. = ex Kalendis, from the Kalends, or a. d. ⟨number⟩ Kalendas, the 'x' day before the Kalends (the first day of each month).
- Non. = ex Nonis, from the Nones, or a. d. ⟨number⟩ Nonas, the 'x' day before the Nones (the seventh day of March, May, July, and October, and the fifth of all other months).
- Id. = ex Idibus, from the Ides, or a. d. ⟨number⟩ Idus, the 'x' day before the Ides (the fifteenth day of March, May, July, and October, and the thirteenth of all other months).

=== Praenomina ===
The following praenomina appear in the Fasti Ostienses. Most were regularly abbreviated.

- A. = Aulus
- Ap. = Appius
- C. = Gaius
- Cn. = Gnaeus
- Faustus (not abbreviated)
- L. = Lucius
- M. = Marcus
- M'. = Manius
- P. = Publius
- Q. = Quintus
- Ser. = Servius
- Sex. = Sextus
- T. = Titus
- Ti. = Tiberius

=== First century BC ===
Year BC	Year AUC	Magistracy	Magistrates	Other text
49	705	Coss.	[...] [...]	Pompeiu[s urbem reliquit]
48	706	Coss. IIviri	[C.] Caesar [P. Servilius] M. Acil[ius] [...]	Pompeius Al[exandriae occisus] habitatio po[pulo remissa]
47	707	Coss. IIviri	[Q.] Fufius [P. Vatinius] Q. Vitell[ius] [...]	
46	708	Coss. IIviri	C. Caesar [M. Aemilius] A. Vitelli[us] [...]	annus or[dinatione Caesaris] mutatus aed[es Veneris Genetricis] dedicata ep[ulum et congiarium dat[um] naumachia [...]
45	709	Coss. Suf. IIviri	Q. Fabius [C. Trebonius] [C. Caninius] Q. Vitelli[us] [...]	
44	710	Coss. Suf.	C. Caesar [M. Antonius] P. [Cornelius]	Caesar pare[ns patriae occisus] Populo legavit viritum HS CCC et hortos tr[ans Tiberim ...]
			Years 43 BC to AD 1 missing	

=== First century AD ===
Year AD	Year AUC	Magistracy	Magistrates	Other text
2	756			[...] tecta est hominu[m plus ...g] inta millia can[delis ardentibus obviam processe[runt magistratus] Ostiensium pulla[ti corpus tulerunt] oppidum fuit orn[atum ...] [e]odem anno fi[...]
			Years 3 to 5 missing	
6	760	Coss. Suf. Kal. Jul. IIviri c. p. q. Praef.	[M. Aemilius Lepidus] [L. Arruntius] [L. N]onius Asprenas; Agrippa Caesar [...] A. Egrilius Rufus; L. Cre[pereius?]	
			Years 7 to 13 missing	
14	768	Coss. IIviri	[Sex. Pompeius] [Sex. A]pp[u]lei[us] [...]anius Gemellus II [...]ranius Pollio	[August. I]II Ti. Caesar cens. [egerun]t c. s. c. R. k. XXXXI DCCCC [XXXVII?] xi]v. K. Sept. Augustus [excessit]
15	769	Coss. Suf. Kal. Jul. IIviri	[Drusus Caesa]r Ti. f. C. Norbanus [M. Ju]nius Silanus [...]menius Veiento [A. Egril?]ius Rufus	
16	770	Coss. Suf. IIviri c. p. q.	[Sisenna Statilius Tau]rus; L. Scribon. Libo [C. Vibius] Rufinus [C. Pomponi]us Graecinus [A. Egrili?]us Rufus [P. Paetin]ius Dexter	[...] populo patuit
17	771	Coss. Suf. IIviri	[L. Pomponius Flaccu]s; C. Caeliu[s] [C. Vibius] Marsu[s] [L. Volusei]us Procul[u]s [A. Egrilius?] Rufus Major [...]us Severus	[vii. K. Jun. Germ]anic. Caes[a]r [triumphavi]t ex German.
18	772	Coss. Suf. Kal. Febr. Suf. iii. Kal. Mai. Suf. Kal. Aug. IIviri	[Ti. Caesar III] Germ]anicus Caesar II [L. Sei]us Tubero [M. Livi]neius Regulus [C. Rube]llius Blandus [M. Vip]stanus Gallus; C. Volusius Flaccus II; P. Sabidius II	
19	773	Coss. Suf. Kal. Jul. IIviri	M. Junius Silanus; L. Norbanus Balbus; P. Petronius; P. Lucilius G[amal]a II; M. Suellius M[...]s II	vi. Idus Dec. justitium ob excessum G[er]manici
20	774	Coss. IIviri	M. Valerius Messalla; M. Aur[elius Cotta] M.Valerius [...] C. Avian[ius ...]	v. K. Jun. Drusus [Caesar] triumphavit ex Ill[yrico] vii. Idus Jun. Nero to[g.] sumpsit cong. d.
21	775	Coss.	Ti. Caesar IV [Drusus Caesar II]	
			Years 22 and 23 missing	
24	778	Coss. Suf. Kal. Jul.	Ser. Co[rnelius Cethegus] [L. Visellius Varro] [C. Calpurnius Aviola] [P. Cornelius Scipio]	
			Years 25 to 28 missing	
29	783	Coss. Suf. Kal. Jul. IIviri	C. [Fufius Geminus] [L. Rubellius Geminus] [A. Plautius] [L. Nonius Asprenas] [...] [...]	
30	784	Coss. Suf. Kal. Jul. IIviri	M. V[inicius] [L. Cassius Longinus] [L. Naevius Surdinus] [C. Cassius Longinus] P. Paetinius Dexter II; L. Julius Carbo	iiii. Idus Mart. arcus Dru[si] dedicatus iiii. K. Mai. in locum Dext[ri] IIvir A. Egrilius Rufus pontifex Volkani creatu[s] et A. Host[ili]us Gratu[s] IIvir pronuntiatus
31	785	Coss. Suf. vii. Id. Mai. Suf. Kal. Jul. Suf. Kal. Oct. IIviri c. p. q.	Ti. Caesar A[ug]ustus V Faustus C[or]nel. Sul[la] Sex. Tedius [Cat]ullu[s] L. Fulcinius [Tr]i[o] P. Memmius R[egulus] Q. Fabius Lo[ngus] M. Naevius Opt[atus]	xv. K. Nov. Sejanus s[trang.] K. Nov. Strabo [Sejani] f. strang. vii. K. No[v. Apicata] Sejani se occidi[t ...] Dec. Capito Aelia[nus et] Junilla Sejani f. [in Gem.] iacuerunt
32	786	Coss. Suf. Kal. Jul. IIviri	Camill. Arrunt. Cn. Domit. Aheno[b.] A. Vitellius; L. Bucius Proculu[s] P. Manlius Bassus	
33	787	Coss. Suf. Kal. Jul. IIviri	L. Livius Ocella Sulpicius Galb[a] [L. C]ornelius Sulla; L. Salvius Otho; C. Octaviu[s] P. Lucilius [Gamala IIII?] C. Naevius [...]	[... A]ug. conjur. Sejan[i] [exstincta e]t compl[ures] [in s]calis [Gemoniis iacuer.] [... D]ec. Lami[a praef. urb. exc.]
34	788	Coss. Suf. Kal. Jul. IIviri	[Pa]ullus Fabius Persic. L. Vi[tellius] Q. Marc. Barea Sor. T. Rustius Gallu[s] D. Otacilius Rufu[s] A. Egrilius Rufus	
35	789	Coss. Suf. Kal. Jul.	[C. Cestius] M. Servilius Noni[anus] [D. V]alerius As[iaticus] [P. Gab]inius S[ecundus]	
36	790	Coss. Suf. Kal. Jul. IIviri c. p. q. Praef.	[...] [...] [C. Vettius Rufus] M. Porcius Cato; T. Sextius African. A. Egrilius Rufus; Q. Fabius Longus [II] A. Egrilius Rufus [f.?] in locum A. Egrili Rufi	K. Nov. pars circi inter vitores arsit ad quod T[i.] Caesar HS public [dedit] M. Naevius Optatus pon[t.] Volkani creatus xvi K. Au[g.]
37	791	Coss. Suf. Kal. Jul. Suf. Kal. Sept. IIviri	Cn. Acerronius; C. Pontiu[s] C. Caesar; Ti. Claudius Nero Ger[m.] A. Caecina Paetu[s] C. Caninius Rebilu[s] C. Caecilius Montan[us] Q. Fabius Longus I[II]	xvii. K. Apr. Ti. Caesar Miseni excessit iiii. K. Apr. corpus in urbe perlatum per mili[t.] iii. Non. Apr. f. p. e. e. K. Mai. Antonia diem suum obit. K. Jun. cong. d. LXXV xiiii. [K.] Aug. alteri LXXV
38	792	Coss. Suf. Kal. Jul.	M. Aquila Julianus; P. Nonius Aspren[as] Ser. Asinius Celer; Sex. Nonius Quintilian.	iiii. Idus Jun. Drusilla excessi[t] xii. K. Nov. Aemiliana arser.
			Years 39 to 52 missing	
53	807	Coss. Suf. Kal. ... Suf. Kal. ... IIviri	[...] [...] [Q. Caeci]na Primus [P.] Trebonius [P. Calvis]ius Ruso [...] Sergius Florus [...]	
54	808	Coss.	[M. Asinius Marc.] M'. Aci]lius Aviol[a]	
			Years 55 to 65 missing	
66	820	IIviri c. p. q.	[A. Egrilius Ru]fus II [... us]	[...]m. arsit
			Years 67 to 70 missing	
71	825	IIviri c. p. q.	Q. Sallinius [... I]I; P. Luci[lius Ga]mala f.	[T. C]aesarem V[espasian. Au]g. f. im[p. ...]mit
72	826	Coss. Suf. Kal. ... Suf. Kal. ...	[Imp. Caesar V]espasian[us Aug. IIII] [T. Caesar I]mp. II; C. Licin[ius Mucian. III] [T. Flavius Sabi]n. II [M. Ul]pius Tr[ajanus]	
			Year 73 missing	
74	828	Coss. Suf. Id. Jan. Suf. Id. Mart. Suf. Id. Mai.	Imp. Caesar Vesp[a]sianus V T. Caesar Aug. f. [III] Ti. Plautius Silvan. Aelianus [II] L. Junius Vibius Crispus [II] [Q. Petil. Cerial. II] [T. Clod. Marcellus II]	
			Years 75 to 80 missing	
81	835	IIviri c. p. q.	[...] [...]us	[... on.]
82	836	Coss. Suf. Suf. Kal. Jul.?	[Domitianus VIII] [T. Flavius] Sabin. [... In]noc. [...]an. [... Mettius Mo]dest. [P. Valerius Patruinus] [L. Antonius Saturnin.]	
			Year 83 missing	
84	838	Suf. Kal. Mai. Suf. Kal. Sept.? Suf. ... IIviri	[... L. Julius U]rsus [C. Tullius Capito] [C. Cornelius Ga]llican. [... G]allus [...Celsus] [...]	[... Imp. Domitianus congiarium divisit] LXXV
85	839	Coss. Suf. Kal. Mart. Suf. Kal. Mai. Suf. Kal. Jul. Suf. Kal. Sept. Suf. Kal. Nov. IIviri	[Domitianus XI] [T. Aurelius Ful]vos II [C. Rutilius Gallic. II] [L. Vale]rius Mess. II [M. Arrecinus Clemens II] [L. Baebius Honor]atus [P. Herennius Pollio] [M. Herennius Po]llio f. [D. Aburius Bassus] [Q. Julius Bal]bus [C. Salvius Liberalis] [... Ore]stes [... Secu]ndin. [...]	
86	840	Coss. Suf. Id. Jan. Suf. Kal. Mart. Suf. Kal. Mai Suf. Kal. Sept.	[Domitianus XII] [Ser. Cornelius Dolabe]lla [C. Secius Campan]us [...] [Q. Vibius Secu]nd. [Sex. Octavius Fronto] [Ti. Julius Candid]us [A. Lappius Maximus] [L. Javolenus Prisc]us	[...]m
			Year 87 missing	
88	842	Coss. Suf. Id. Jan. Suf. Kal. Mai.	[Domitianus XIIII] [L. Minucius] Rufus [D. Plotius Gr]ypus [C. Ninnius Hasta] [L. Scribonius] Frugi	
			Years 89 and 90 fragmentary	Taren[t] viii. K. Mai. [...] [... o]deum in ca[mpo Martio]
91	845	IIviri c. p. q.	C. Cuperiu[s ...] C. Arriu[s ...]	[...]ar[l]s in [fundo?] Volusiano arb[os ful] mine icta con[itum per] aedilicios
92	846	Coss. Suf. Id. Jan. Suf. Kal. Mai. Suf. Kal. Sept. IIviri	Domitianus XVI; Q. Volusi[us Saturninus] L. Venuleius A[pronianus] L. Stertinius Avitus; Ti. J[ulius Polemaean.] C. Julius Silanus; Q. Aru[lenus Rusticus] L. Terentius Tertiu[s] [...]acus	
93	847	Coss. Suf. Kal. ... Suf. Kal. ... Suf. Kal. ...	[Sex. Pompeius Collega] [Q. Peducaeus Pris]cus [T. Avidius Quietus] [L. Dasumius Hadri]anus [C. Cornelius Rurus [...]us [L. Julius Marinus?] [... Tuccius Ceria?]lis	[... Imp. Domitianus congiar. divisit LX]XV [...]er [...]i[...] [in locum] Q. Dom[iti ... defuncti] [P. Ost]iensis Mac[edo pontif. Volkani] [et aedium sacrarum? creatus est]
94	848	Coss. Suf. Kal. Mai. Suf. Kal. Sept. IIviri	[L. Nonius Aspre]nas; T. Sextius Ma[gius Lateranus] D. Valerius Asiaticus; A. Ju[lius Quadratus] L. Silius Decianus; T. Pomp[onius Bassus] A. Caesilius Honorin[us] [...]	Ostis crypta Terent[iana] restituta est
95	849	Coss. Suf. Id. Jan. Suf. Kal. Mai. Suf. Kal. Sept. IIviri	Domitianus XVII; T. Flavius [Clemens] L. Neratius Mar[cellus] A. Lappius Maxim. II; P. Duce[nius Verus] Q. Pomponius Rufus; L. Baebiu[s Tullus] [P. Lucretius Cinna] L. Naevius Proc[ulus]	
96	850	Coss. Suf. Kal. Mai. Suf. Kal. Sept. IIviri c. p. q.	C. Manlius Valens; C. Antistius Ve[tus] Q. Fabius Postumin. T. Priferniu[s Paetus] Ti. Caesius Fronto; M. Calpurniu[s ...] [...] II [...]	xiiii. K. Oct. Domitianus o[ccisus] eodem die M. Cocceius N[erva] Imperator appellatu[s est] xiii. K. Oct. s. c. fact[um ...]
97	851	Coss. Suf. Kal. Mart.? Suf. Kal. Mai. Suf. Kal. Jul. Suf. Kal. Sept. Suf. Kal. Nov.	[Imp. Nerva Caesar Aug. III] [M. Verginius Rufu]s III [... Arrius Antoninus II] [C.? Calpurn]ius Piso [M.] Annius Verus [L. Neratius Priscus] [L. Do]mitius Apollinar. Sex. [Hermetidius Campan.] Q. Atiliu[s Agricola] [...] [...]	[Imp. Nerva Caesar? Germani]cus [... Traja]num [... a]dop[tavit]
98	852	Coss. Suf. Id. Jan. Suf. Kal. Febr. Suf. Kal. Mart. Suf. Kal. Apr. Suf. Kal. Mai. Suf. Kal. Jul. Suf. Kal. Sept. Suf. Kal. Nov.	[Imp. Nerv]a Caesa[r Aug. Germ. IIII] [Imp. Nerva Caesar Trajanus II] Cn. Domiti[us Tullus II] Sex. Julius Fron[tinus II] L. Julius Ursus [II] T. Vestricius Spu[rinna II] C. Pomponius [Pius] A. Vicirius Martia[lis] [L. Maecius Postumus] [C.] Pomponius Ru[fus] [Cn. Pompeius Ferox] [Q. Bittius Proculus] [P. Julius Lupus]	
			Year 99 missing	
100	854	Coss. Suf. Id. Jan. Suf. Kal. Mart.? Suf. Kal. Mai.? Suf. Kal. Jul. Suf. Kal. Sept. Suf. Kal. Nov.	[Imp. Nerva Trajanus Au]g. [III] [Sex. Julius Frontinus III] [L.] Julius Ur[sus III] [...]cius Macer; C. Cilnius Proculus [L. Her]ennius Saturnin. L. Pompon. Mamilian. [Q.] Acutius Nerva; L. Fabius Tuscus; C. Julius Cornutus; C. Plinius Secundus; L. Roscius Aelianus; Ti. Claudius Sacerdo[s]	[...] consummat[... ab Im]p. Trajan[o]

=== Second century ===
Year AD	Year AUC	Magistracy	Magistrates	Other text
101	855	Coss. Suf. Kal. Febr. Suf. Kal. Apr.	[Imp. Ne]rv[a Trajanus Aug. IIII] [Q. Articuleius Paetus] Se[x. Attius Suburanus Aemilian.] Q. Servae[us Innocens] [M. Maecius Celer]	[... in locum ... Cl]emens IIvi[r c. p. q. factus]
102	856	Coss. Suf. Kal. Mart. Suf. Kal. Mai.? Suf. Kal. Sept.? IIviri	[L. Julius Servianus II] [L. Li]cinius Sura [II] [L. Fabius] Just[us] [L. Publi]lius Cels[us] [L. Antonius Albus] [M. Juniu]s [Homullus] Cn. Se[ntius] Clodianus; P. V[...]	[Imp. Nerva Trajanus Aug. Ger. contionem ad] vocavit [qua cogno]min[atus est Dacicus et deos in] tribuna[li precat]us est v[... K. Jan. Imp. Trajanus] de Dacis [triump]havit
103	857	Coss. Suf. Id.? Jan. Suf. ...	[Imp. Nerv]a Trajan[us Aug. G]er. Dacic. V M'. La[berius Maximus II] Q. [Glitiu]s Agr[icola II] [P. M]etiliu[s Nepos] Q. Baebi. [M. Flavius Ap]er; C. Mettiu[s Modestus] [A]nnius Mela; P. Calpurn[ius Macer]	[... Fe]br. Imp. Nerva Traja[nus Aug. Ge]rmanic. Dacicus c[ong.] dedit?] viii. K. Jan. [...] [...] victor fu[...] [...]at co[epit]
104	858	IIviri	[...]us Veru[s]	[v]etustate corr[uptum ...] [...] restitutum [...] [... J]ulias
105	859	Coss. Suf. Kal. Mai. Suf. xvi. Kal. Aug. Suf. Kal. Sept. IIviri	[Ti. Julius C]andidus II; A. Julius Quadratus [II] C. Julius Bassus; Cn. Afranius Dexte[r] Q. Caelius Honoratus loco Dextri; M. Vitorius Marcellus; C. Caecilius Strabo; A. Livius Priscus; L. Licinius Valerianus	pr. Non. Jun. Imp. Nerva Trajanus Aug. in Moesia pro fectus viii. K. Jul. Afranius Dexter cos. in domo sua exanimis inventus in locum P. Ostiensis Mace donis defuncti M. Acilius Priscus Egrilius Plaria nus p. c. pontif. Volkani et aedium sacrar. creatus est
106	860	Coss. IIviri c. p. q. Praef.	L. Ceionius Commodus; Sex. Vettulenus Civica Cerialis [M. Acilius Priscus Egriliu]s Plarianus p. c. [...] [...]us p. c.	[...]i[...] [... caput] Decibali [...] [... in sca]lis Gemoni[is ...] [Imp. Nerva Trajanus Caes. A]ug. Germ. Dac[icus]
107	861	Coss. Suf. Kal. Mart. Suf. Kal. Mai. Suf. Kal. Sept. IIviri	[L. Licinius Sura III] [Q. Sosius S]enecio II [L. Acilius] Rufu[s] [C. Minicius Fundanus] [C. Vette]nnius Seve[rus] [C. Julius Longinus] [C. Valeriu]s Paull[inus] [...]nus [...]us Honoratus [...]	vii. K. Ju[n.? Imp.] [Trajanus [... co]ngiarium ded[it ...] [... Imp. Trajanus lusionem p]rimam muneris [secundi edere coepit diebus ...] pp. CCCXXXII s. [... lusionem secundam edere c]oepit diebus XII [pp. ...]
108	862	Coss. Suf. Kal. Mai. Suf. Kal. Sept. IIviri	[Ap. Annius Gallus] [M. Atilius] Bradua [P. Aelius Hadrianus] [M. Treb]atius Priscus [...] Q. Pompe]ius F[alco] A. Manlius Augustalis; C. Julius Proculus	[Imp. Trajanus lusionem tertiam? muneris] secundi edere coepit quam consummavit iii. K. Apr. diebus XIII pp. CCCXL pr. Non. Jun. Imp. Trajanus munus secundum edere coepit
109	863	Coss. Suf. Kal. Mart. Suf. Kal. Mai. Suf. Kal. Sept. IIviri	[A.] Cornelius Palma II; P. Calvisius Tullus; L. Annius Largus; Cn. Antonius Fuscus; C. Julius Philopappus; C. Aburnius Valens; C. Julius Proculus; M. Valerius Euphemianus; C. Valerius Justus	x. K. Jul. Imp. Nerva Trajanus Caes. Aug. Germ. Dacicus thermas suas dedicavit et publicavit viii. K. Jul. aquam suo nomine tota urbe salientem dedicavit K. Nov. Imp. Trajanus munus suum consummavit diebus CXVII gladiatorum pp. XXXX DCCCCXLI s. iii. Id. Nov. [I]mp. Trajanus naumachiam suam dedicavit [in] qua dieb. VI pp. CXXVII s. et consumm. viii. K. Dec.
110	864	Coss. Suf. IIviri	[M. Peducaeu]s Priscinus; Ser. Scipio Orfitus [C. Av]idius Nigrinus; Ti. Julius Aquila [L.] Catilius Severus; C. Erucianus Silo; A. Larcius Priscus; Sex. Marcius Honoratus; P. Naevius Severus; D. Nonius Pompilianus	
111	865	Coss. Suf. Kal. Mai. Suf. Kal. Sept. IIviri c. p. q.	[C. Cal]purnius Piso; M. Vettius Bolanus; T. Avidius Quietus; L. Eggius Marullus; L. Octavius Crassus; P. Coelius Apollinaris; C. Nasennius Marcellus III p. c. [C.] Valerius Justus II	
112	866	Coss. Suf. Id. Jan.? Suf. ... IIviri	[Imp. Nerva Trajanu]s Caes. Aug. Germ. Dac. VI; T. Sextius Africanus [...] Licinius Ruso [Cn. Cor]nelius Severus; Q. Valerius Vegetus [P. Sterti]nius Quartus; T. Julius Maximus [C. Clau]dius Severus; T. Settidius Firmus [... L]ongus Grattianus Caninianus [... F]adius Probianus	[K. Ja]nuar. Imp. Trajanus forum suum et [bas]ilicam Ulpiam dedicavit iii. K. Febr. Imp. [Tra]janus ludos commisit theatris tribus [dieb]us xv. in is missilia triduo et K. Martis [cir]censes [miss]us XXX qua die senatui et equestri [ord]ini [epulum d]edit vii. K. Julias Imp. Trajanus [...]iam edere coepit iiii. K. Septembr. [Marciana Aug]usta excessit divaq. cognominata [eodem die Mati]dia Augusta cognominata iii. [Non. Sept. Mar]ciana Augusta funere censorio [elata est ...]Imp. Trajanus reliqua paria [...]ae edere coepit qui dies vindemi [alis nominatus] xi. K. Sept. aedis Volkani vetustate corrupta [restituta or]nato opera dedicata est.
113	867	Coss. Suf. Kal. Mart. Suf. Kal. Mai. Suf. Kal. Sept.	[L. Publilius Celsus] II; C. Clodius Crispinus [Ser.] Cornelius Dolabella [L. Stertini]us Noricus; L. Fadius Rufinus [Cn. Corneli]us Urbicus; T. Sempronius Rufus	[... M]aias consummata sportula III [lusionibus] pp. MCCII iiii. Id. Mai. Imp. Trajanus [templum Ve]neris in foro Caesaris et [columna]m in foro suo dedicavit pr. Id. Mai.
			Year 114 missing	
115	869	Suf. ... Suf. Kal. Sept. IIviri	[P.Afrani]us [Flavianus?] [M. Pompeius Mac]rinu[s] [T.] Vibius [Varus] L. Furius Manlianus; Ti. Clau[dius ...]	[...]ida v. V. [...] K. Nov. noc[tu? ...] [Id. Dec. terrae m]otus fuit [... K.] Jan. Umm[idia] [Quadratilla] Q. Asini Mar[celli] consular[is ...] [...]r K. Januar. incendium ortum in v[ico? ...] et praedia complura deusta sun[t]
116	870	Coss. Suf.	[L. Lami]a Aelianus; Sex. Carminiu[s Vetus] Ti. Julius Secundus; M. Egnatiu[s Marcellinus] D. Terentius Gentianus; Q. Co[rnelius Annianus] L. Statius Aquila; C. Juliu[s Berenicianus]	[i?]x. K. Mart. laureatae missae ad sen[atum ab Imp.] Trajano Aug. ob q[u]am causam Par[thicus appell.] [e]t pro salute eius s. c. f. et supp. [per omnia delu] [b]ra et ludi facti V IIII pr. K. M[art. ... circ.] miss. XXX pr. Non. Mai. epist[ulae missae ad senat.] ab Imp. Trajano Aug. proc[edente]
			Years 117 to 124 missing	
125		879		[Imp. Caesar Trajanus Hadria]nus Aug. mu[nus edere] [coepit gladi]ator. pp. [...]II xiiii. K. Maias composit[a sunt] [II lusio]nibus et munere dier. XXXVIII gladiatoru[m pp.] [...]XXVIII bestiae confectae n. II CCXLVI VII K. Junias [Augustus p]r. lusione, muneris Veneri edere coepit pugnat. [diebus ...]II pr. Non. Jun. lusionem secundam edere coep. pugnat. [diebus ...]III gladiator. pp. CLXXXXV bestiae confectae n. CCCCXXXXIII
126	880	IIviri c. p. q. Praef.	[Imp. Caesar Trajanus Hadr]ianus Aug. II [...]r p. c. [A. Egrilius Plarianus?] pater [...]du[...]	[Imp. Caesar Trajanus Hadri]anus Aug. munu[s] [edidit ... t]emplum divoru[m] [... dedicavit ob quam] causam in circo [... munus editu]m et consumm[at.] [... pp.] MDCCCXXXV
127	881	Coss. Suf. Kal. Apr. Suf. Kal. Mai. Suf. Kal. Oct. IIviri	[T. Atilius Titianus] [M. G]avius Sq[uilla G]allicanus; P. Tullius Varr[o] [...] J[un]ius Paetus; Q. Tineius Rufus [M.] Licinius Nepos; L. Aemilius Juncus [Se]x. Julius Severus; M. Antistius Flavianus; L. Valeriu[s ...]	v. Non. Mart. Augustus profe[ct]us ad Italiam circum[circa ...] I[d.?] Aug. reversus xiii. K. Nov. lud[i] votivi deceannale[s facti pro] salute Aug. dieb. X xiii. K. Nov. in circo p. f. XXX viiii. K. Febr. templum Sarapi quod [...] Caltilius P[...] sua pecunia exstruxit dedicatum [es]t
128	882	Coss. Suf. Kal. Febr. Suf. Kal. Apr. Suf. Kal. Jul. Suf. Kal. Oct.	L. Nonius Asprenas Torquatus II [M. A]nn[ius Libo] L. Caesennius Antoninus; M. Mettius Rufus; Q. [Pomponius Maternus] L. Valerius Flaccus; M. [Junius Homullus?] A. Egrilius Plarianus; Q. [...]	K. Jan. Imp. Caesar Trajanus Hadrianu[s Aug.]
			Years 129 to 139 missing	
140	894	Suf. Kal Jul. Suf. Kal. Sept. Suf. Kal. Nov. IIviri	[...] [...] M. [Barbius Aemilianus] [T. Flavius Julianus] A. Egril[ius ...]li[...] [...]	[...]or [...] v. K. Mart. Imp. Ant[oninus Aug. congiar.] de[dit LXXV eodem die Imp.] Antoninus Au[g. familia? glad]iator[ia ...] pp. CCXXVII s. vi. K. [Maias] statu[a Aur]eli Cae[saris ... dedicata est] xvi. et xv. K. Jul. ludi [Taurei] qu[inque]nnal[es in circo Flaminio facti] xiii. K. Nov. Antoni[nus Aug. tota sua] famili[a adsistente celebravit] ieiunium Cereris x[... K. Nov. Fausti]na Aug[usta excessit eodem. die a] senatu diva app[ellata et s. c. fact]um fun[ere censorio eam efferendam] ludi et circenses [delati sunt ... I]dus N[ov. Faustina Augusta funere] censorio elata e[st? statuae aureae atq. argenteae positae s. c.] de puellis Fausti[nianis factum ... C. Bruttius Praesens praef. urbis] excessit vi. K. Mai. sta[tua M. Aurel]i Ca[esaris ...] publice po[sita]
141	895	Coss. Suf. Kal. Mart. Suf. Kal. Mai. Suf. Kal. Jul. Suf. Kal. Nov.? IIviri	[T. H]oeni[us Severus] [M. Peducaeus Priscinus] [...] [...] [...] [...]sian[us? ...] [L. Annius] Fabianus [...] [...]	[...] Pharasman[es rex Iberorum ... cum filio] [...]e et uxore Phr[... cui Imp. Antoninus Aug. regnum] [amplius] reddidit v. K. Apr. [...] [...]i. Non. Mai. diem [qua ...] [...]vit gladiat[orum ...] [...]MXI [v]ocitatae sunt [...] [...]ea exornata [...] [...]t dedicavit X[... K. Nov. ara et statuae Imp.] [Antonio Aug. et d]ivae Faustinae [ob insignem eorum] [concor] [diam in foro de]dicatae
142	896	Coss. Suf. Kal. Apr.? Suf. Kal. Jul. Suf. Kal. Sept. Suf. Kal. Nov.?	[L. Cuspius Pacumeius Rufus] L. [Statius Quadratus] [Granius?] Castus [...] [M. Corneli]us Fronto [L. Laberius Priscus] [L. Tusidiu]s Campester [Q. Cornelius Senecio Annianus] [Sulpicius] Julianus	
			Years 143 and 144 missing	
145	899	Suf. Kal. Sept. Suf. Kal. Nov. IIviri	[L.] Petronius Sabinus; C. Vicriu[s Rufus] C. Fadius Rufus; P. Vicrius [...] P. Turranius Aemilianus fil. L. Pomponius Pri[...]	[...]as Annia Faustina M. Aurellio Caesari nupsit [...] [Imp. A]ntoninus Aug. congiar. dedit C iii. Id. Mai. dies promi[ssos] [... ed]ere coepit vii. et vi. K. Jul. ludi Taurei quinquennales [facti] [in] circo Flaminio xvii. K. Oct. de Cornelio Prisciano in sen. [jud.] [cor]am factum quod provinciam Hispaniam hostiliter [inq]uietaverit
146	900	Coss. Suf. ... Mart. Suf. ... IIviri q. c. p.	[Sex. Eru]cius Clarus II; Cn. Claudius Seve[rus] loco Clari Q. Licinius Modest[inus] [P.] Mummius Sisenna; T. Prifernius Paet[us] Cn. Terentius Junior; L. Aurelius Gall[us] Q. Voconius Saxa; C. Annianus Ver[us] L. Aemilius Longus; Q. Cornelius Procu[lus] A. Egrilius Agricola p. p. c. D. Nonius Pompilian. p. p. c.	[...] Mart. Erucius Clarus praef. urbis dece[ssit ...]m[...] [M]ai[a]s agon quin[q. Jovis Capitolini commissus ...] Idus Jun. [but]hysia fuit et circenses more a[go]nis iii. et pr. Id. Jun. [gy]mnicum consummatum [... P.? Au]fidius Fortis p. p. c. ob dedicatione statuarum argent. [Ho]noris et Virtutis ludos per triduum sua pec. edidit
147	901	Coss. Suf. IIviri	[C. Prastin]a Messalinus; L. Annius Largus [A. C]laudius Charax; Q. Fuficius Cornutus [...] Cupressenus Gallus; Cornelius Quadratus [Se]x. Cocceius Severianus; Ti. Licinius Cassianus [in lo]cum Cassiani C. Popilius Pedo [L.] Plinius Nigrinus; P. Annius Annianus	[...] K. Febr. Imp. Antoninus Aug. pontem Agrippae dedic. [...]x. K. April. aqua magna fuit pr. K. Dec. Aurelio Caesar. [ex A]nnia Faustina filia nata est K. Decem. Aurelius Caesar [trib] pot. iniit et Faustina Aug. cognominata est
148	902	Coss. Suf.	[L Octavi]us Salvius Julianus; C. Bellicius Torquatus [...] Satyrius Firmus; C. Salvius Capito [L.] Coelius Festus; P. Orfidius Senecio [C.] Fabiu[s] Agrip[pin]us; M. Ant[o]nius Zeno	
			Year 149 missing	
150?	904?	IIviri	[...]us L. [...]	[...] K. Jun. [...] [... Ju]n. ludi Taur[ei quinquennales in circo] [Flaminio fa]cti vii. K. Oct. i[eiunium Cereris? celeb.] [... i]n senatu [...]
151	905	IIviri	[...]I; C. Mamilius Martia[lis]	[...]mm[...] [...] xi. Ka[l. J]un. cong. dedit [...] [... Sa]riolenus Junianus Labe[rius] [Priscus ...] deportati sunt
152	906	Coss. Suf. IIviri	[M'. Acilius Glabrio] [M. Va]lerius Homullu[s] [L. Claudius Modestus] [L.] Dasumius Tus[cus] [C. Novius Priscus] [L.] Julius Romu[lus] [P. Cluvius Maximus] M. Servilius Sila[nus] [...]s M. Julius Sever[us]	[... Cornificia soro]r M. Aureli Caes. excessi[t] [... ex An]nia Faustinus filius n[atus] [... Imp. Antoninus] Aug. pontem Cesti [vestutate collapsum? r]estituit [...]us ob dedicationem basili[cae] [... quam pec]unia sua extruxit famili[a] [glad. munus venatio]ne legitima edidit in qua [...] [... fu?]erunt duo praeterea statu[as] [dedic. Genii et Fort. po]puli Ostiensis quas pos. s. p. in [foro] [ex v. s. ...]i pr. K. Junias Juliano et Torq[uato cos.]
153	907	Coss. Suf. IIviri	[C. Bruttius Praesens] A. Junius Rufinu[s] [Sex. Caecilius? Max]imus; M. Pontius Sabin[us] [P. Septumius Ape]r; M. Sedatius Severian[us] [... Gal]lus; C. Catius Marcel[lus] [...] Fortis; L. [...]	[...]i Aug. quod appellatu[r] [ful]mini ictum [...]
154	908	Coss. Suff.	[L. Aurelius Commod]us; T. Sextius [Lateranus] [...] Paetus; M. N[onius Macrinus] [M. Valerius Etrus]cus; L. [Aemilius Juncus] [Ti. Claudius Julia]nus; Sex. [Calpurnius Agricola] [... C. Julius Severus] [T.] Jun[ius Severus]	
			Years 155 to 157 missing	
158	912	Coss. Suf. IIviri	[Sex. Pedius Hirr]utus; L. Ju[nius ...] [... in loc]um Pedi Hirruti [...] [... P]roclianus; D. [...]	[... Imp. ...]us Aug. congiar[ium dedit ...] [...] cum quinque [...]
			Year 159 missing	
160	914	Coss. Suf.	[Ap. Annius Atilius Bradua] [T. Clo]dius Vibius Varus [... Postu]mius Festus [... in locum? ... C. Septimius S]everus [M. C]ensorius Paulus [... Nin]nius Hastianus [... N]ovius Sabinius	[... jejunium Cere]alis qq. celebra [tum est ...] [... Q. Lollius Urbicus praef. u]rb. excess[it]
			Years 161 to 163 missing	
164	918			[... v]ocitatae sunt [...] [...]ea exornata [...] [...]t dedicavit x[... K. Nov. ...] [statuae? ... d]ivae Faustinae [...] [... de]dicatae
165	919	Coss. Suf.	[M. Gavius Orfitus] L. [Arrius Pudens] [...] Castus [...] [M. Claudi]us Fronto [...] [... Tusidiu]s Campester [...] [...] Julianus [...]	[... lud]us magnus incend[io consumptus ...] [... munus ...]e commissum x. K. Ma[...] [...]ov IAI[...] [...] est [...] Non. M[art. ...] [...] April. [...] [...]s pr[...] [... Au]gu[stus]
			Years 166 to 173 missing	
174	928	IIviri	[...] [...]ianus	[c]oep. [... muneris] sui [... ed]ere coep.
175	929	Coss. Suf. IIviri	[L. Calpurnius Piso] [C. Salvius Jul]ianus [...]anus [...]ianus [...] filio [...] [...]	[... Imp. M. Antoninus] Augustus [... congiarum dedit CX]X dilato [...] muneris [... pp.] II DCCLVII [...] di[...] repetit [...] consum[mat ...] gregar[iorum ...] profec[t ... quinquen] nale [...] na[...] Ju[...]

== See also ==
- List of Roman consuls
- List of ancient Roman fasti
- Roman calendar

== Bibliography ==
- Theodor Mommsen et alii, Corpus Inscriptionum Latinarum (The Body of Latin Inscriptions, abbreviated CIL), Berlin-Brandenburgische Akademie der Wissenschaften (1853–present).
- Harper's Dictionary of Classical Literature and Antiquities, Harry Thurston Peck, ed. (Second Edition, 1897).
- Oxford Classical Dictionary, N. G. L. Hammond and H. H. Scullard, eds., Clarendon Press, Oxford (Second Edition, 1970).
- Ladislav Vidman, Fasti Ostienses: Edendos, Illustrandos, Restituendos Curavit, second edition, Československá Akademie, Prague (1982).
- Bernhard Brehmer, "Fasti Ostienses", in Brill's New Pauly (2006).
- Christer Bruun, "Civic Rituals in Imperial Ostia", in Ritual Dynamics and Religious Change in the Roman Empire, pp. 123–141, Koninklijke Brill NV, Leiden (2009).
