= Pharnavazid dynasty =

Georgian kings of Kartli (Iberia)

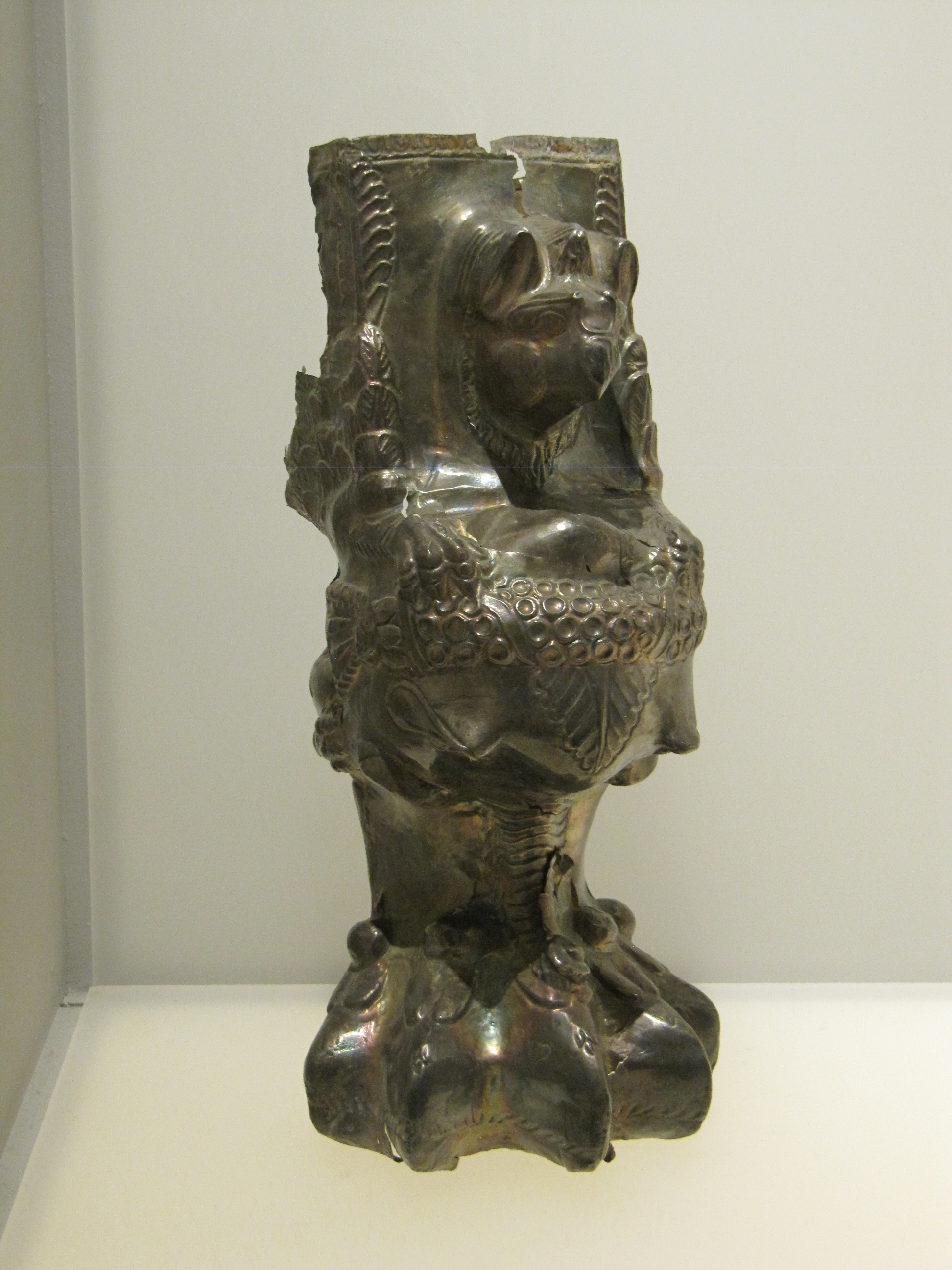
- Claw foot of the royal throne found at Mount Bagineti, 2nd century AD. Kept at the Georgian National Museum in Tbilisi.
- Country: Kingdom of Iberia; Colchis; Kingdom of Armenia
- Founded: 3rd century BC
- Founder: Pharnavaz I
- Final ruler: Amazasp II; Aspacures I (through female line)
- Style: Style of the Georgian sovereign
- Estate: Kingdom of Iberia
- Cadet branches: Arsacid dynasty of Iberia (through female line)

The Pharnavazid (Georgian: ფარნავაზიანი, romanized: parnavaziani) is the name of the first dynasty of Georgian kings of Kartli (Iberia) preserved by The Georgian Chronicles. Their rule lasted, with intermissions, from the 3rd century BC to the 2nd century AD. The main male line is reported to have become extinct early on and followed by houses related to it in the female line. By the close of the 2nd century AD, the Pharnavazid rule came to an end and the Arsacid dynasty took over the crown of Iberia.

== History ==
According to the early medieval Georgian chronicle, The Life of the Georgian Kings, the dynasty descended from Pharnavaz I, the founder of the Kingdom of Iberia, who ousted Azo, a ruler allegedly left by Alexander the Great to govern the country. Pharnavaz, whose story is saturated with legendary imagery and symbols, is not attested directly in non-Georgian sources and there is not definite contemporary indication that he was the first of the Georgian kings. However, the Georgian dynastic tag Parnavaziani ("of/from/named for Parnavaz"), which the early Armenian histories have preserved as P’arnawazean (Faustus 5.15; 5th century) and P’arazean (Primary History of Armenia 14; probably the early 5th century), is an acknowledgment that a king named Pharnavaz was understood to have been the founder of a Georgian dynasty. It seems more feasible that as the memory of the historical facts faded, the real Pharnavaz "accumulated a legendary façade" and emerged as the model pre-Christian monarch in the Georgian annals.

Although Alexander's expedition into the Georgian lands is entirely fictional, Georgian and Classical evidence suggests that the kings of Iberia cultivated close relations with the Seleucid Empire, a Hellenistic successor to Alexander's short-lived empire centered on Syria, and at times recognized its suzerainty, probably aiding, as Professor Cyril Toumanoff has implied, their overlords in holding in check the Orontid dynasty of neighboring Armenia.

Pharnavaz is supposed by Toumanoff to have ruled from 299 to 234 BC. His son, Saurmag (r. 234–159 BC), is reported to have died without a male heir, and the dynasty survived in the female line through the marriage of Saurmag's daughter to Mirian (I) (r. 159–109 BC), of the Nimrodids. The Nimrodids, in Georgian Nebrot'iani (ნებროთიანი), which means the "race of Nimrod", is not a dynastic name but the term applied by the medieval Georgian annalists to the ancient Iranians. Hence, the dynasty, although in the female line only, continues to be called by the chronicles as P’arnavaziani ("Second Pharnabazid" as suggested by Toumanoff).

The dynasty, in the person of Mirian's son, P’arnajom (r. 109–90 BC), was dispossessed of the crown by a branch of the Armenian Artaxiads whose ascendancy in Iberia lasted from 90 to 30 BC when the Pharnabazids were able to resume the throne. By that time, the South Caucasus had been brought under Roman hegemony. However, Iberia succeeded in detaching itself from the Roman dominion in the last decade of the 1st century BC and emerged as a more powerful state in the 1st century AD. Pharasmanes I of Iberia (r. AD 1–58) energetically interfered in the affairs of Armenia which was then a bone of contention between Rome and Parthia and installed his brother, Mithridates (AD 35–51), on the throne of Armenia. In 51, however, Pharasmanes instigated his son, Rhadamistus, to remove Mithridates and occupy the Armenian throne, only to be expelled from his kingdom in 55. Pharasmanes's successor, Mihrdat I (58–106) forged an alliance with Rome to defend the Iberian frontiers from Alans, nomads from the north. Armazi stele of Vespasian discovered at Mtskheta, capital of Iberia, speaks of Mihrdat as "the friend of the Caesars" and the king "of the Roman-loving Iberians." In 75, the Roman Emperor Vespasian helped the king of Iberia to fortify the acropolis of Armazi.

Once the scions of Parthian Arsacids had consolidated their hold over Armenia in the 2nd century AD, their branch replaced the Pharnabazids in Iberia. According to the Georgian chronicles, this happened when the nobles staged a revolt against Amazaspus (II) (r. 185–189) and with help of the king of Armenia, probably Vologases II (r. 180–191), who is reported to have been married to Amazasp's sister, deposed and killed their monarch. Vologases installed his son and Amazasp's nephew, Rev (I) (r. 189–216) on the throne of Iberia, inaugurating the local Arsacid dynasty.

== Pharnavazid kings of Iberia ==
=== First dynasty ===
- Pharnavaz I of Iberia, 302–236/4 BC
- Sauromaces I of Iberia (son), 234–159 BC

=== Second dynasty ===
- Mirian I of Iberia (son-in-law and adopted son), 159–109 BC
- Pharnajom of Iberia (son), 109–90 BC
- Interruption, 90-30 BC
- Mirian II of Iberia (son), 30–20 BC
- Artaxias II of Iberia (son), 20 BC–AD 1

=== Third dynasty ===
- Pharasmanes I of Iberia (son of Kartam, descendant of Pharnavaz I's sister and Sauromaces I's daughter), 1–58
- Mihrdat I of Iberia (son), 58–106
- Amazasp I of Iberia (son), 106–116
- Pharasmanes II of Iberia (son), 116–132
- Ghadam of Iberia (son), 132–135
- Pharasmanes III of Iberia (son), 135–185
- Amazasp II of Iberia (son), 185–189

== Pharnavazid kings of Armenia ==
- Mithridates I (brother of Pharasmanes I), 35–37; 42–51
- Rhadamistus (nephew, brother-in-law and son-in-law), 51–53; 54–55
