= Amazasp II =

King of Iberia from c. 185 to c. 189

King of Iberia
- Reign: 185–189
- Predecessor: Pharasmanes III
- Successor: Rev I the Just
- Dynasty: Pharnavazid dynasty
- Father: Pharasmanes III

Amazasp II (Georgian: ამაზასპ II, sometimes Latinized as Amazaspus) was a king (mepe) of Iberia (Kartli, modern central and eastern Georgia) and the last in the P'arnavaziani line according to the medieval Georgian chronicles. A son and successor of P'arsman III, he is assumed to have ruled in the latter quarter of the 2nd century, from 185 to 189 according to Cyril Toumanoff.

The name Amazasp derives from Middle Persian *Hamazāsp, ultimately from Old Persian Hamāzāspa. Although the precise etymology of *Hamazāsp/Hamāzāspa remains unresolved, it may be explained through Avestan *hamāza-, "colliding/clashing" + aspa-, "horse" i.e. "one who possessed war steeds".

The Georgian chronicles describe, in detail, Amazasp's victory over the invading Alans and his reciprocal raid into the Alan lands. His four-year-long reign is reported to have terminated in a revolt of his nobles supported by Armenia and the Alans. Amazasp was killed in battle and succeeded by his rebel nephew, Rev I.

In 1996, an incomplete Greek inscription mentioning "Amazaspos, great king of the Iberians" was discovered at Bagineti in Mtskheta, the ancient capital of Iberia. According to Tinatin Kaukhchishvili's reconstruction of the damaged text, Amazasp appears to have been married to the daughter of Vologases, king of Armenia. This can be either Amazasp II or the earlier Iberian king Amazasp I, while Vologases is Vologases I (r. 117–138/140) or Vologases II (r. c. 180–191). Another related Greek inscription unearthed at Bagineti mentions Queen Drakontis, identified by David Braund with the queen mentioned in the first inscription. These inscriptions also bring into light a high courtier of Amazaspus, the "rearer" or "foster-father" (τροφεύς) Anagranes.

Preceded by P'arsman III	King of Iberia; 185–189	Succeeded by Rev I
