= Pharasmanes II =

2nd-century king of Iberia (Kartli)

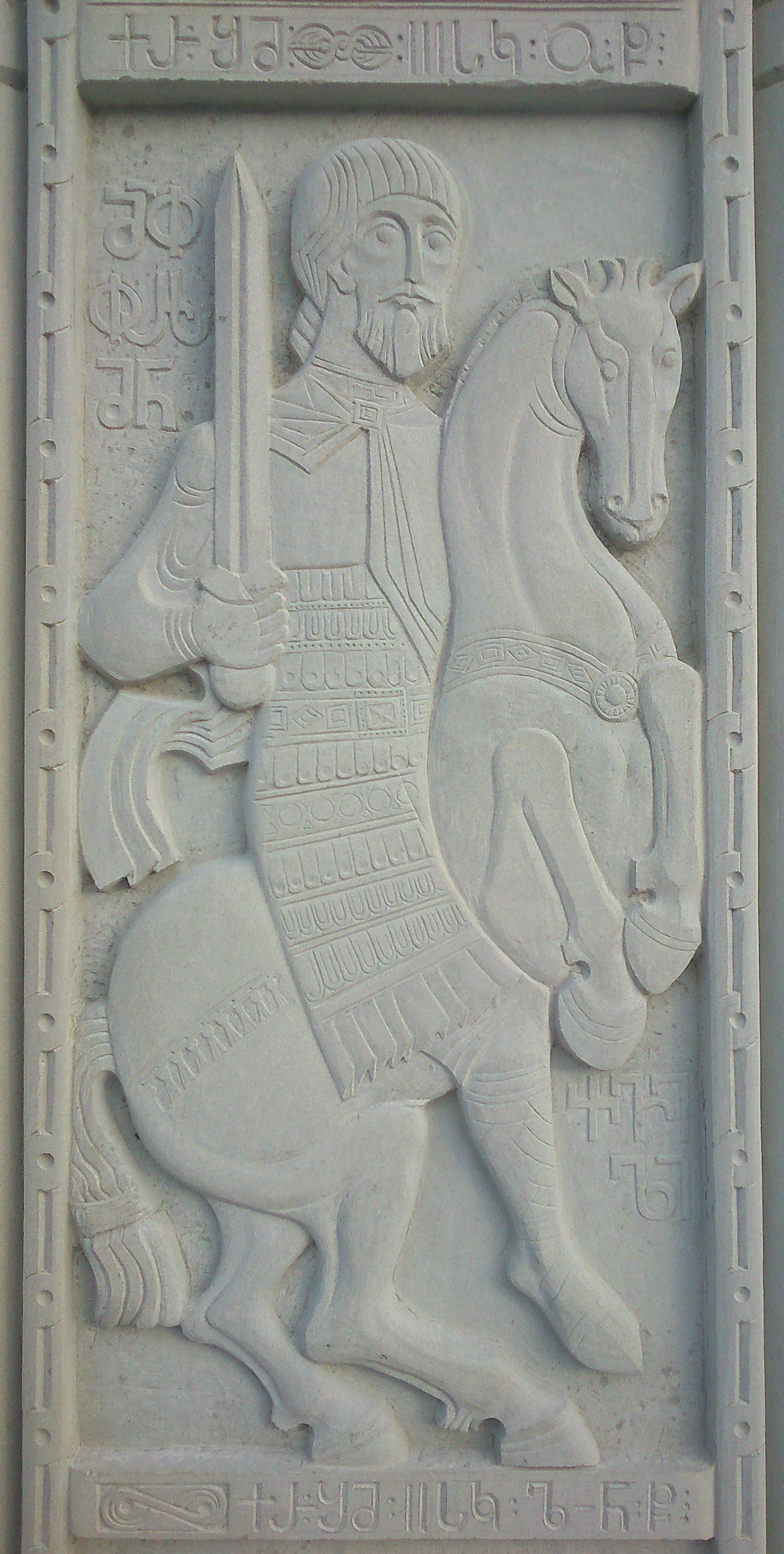
- Relief of King Pharasmanes II

King of Iberia
- Reign: 116–132
- Predecessor: Amazasp I
- Successor: Ghadam
- Died: 132
- Spouse: Ghadana
- Issue: Ghadam
- Dynasty: Pharnavazid dynasty
- Father: Amazasp I of Iberia
- Religion: Georgian paganism

Pharasmanes II the Valiant or the Brave (Georgian: ფარსმან II ქველი) was a king (mepe) of Iberia (Kartli) from the Pharnavazid dynasty, and a contemporary of the Roman emperor Hadrian (r. 117–138). Professor Cyril Toumanoff suggests AD 116–132 as the period of Pharasmanes' reign. He is mentioned in several Classical accounts.

== Life ==
The medieval Georgian annals report Pharasmanes' joint rule with Pharasmanes Avaz, diarchs (one source has the extra pair: Rok and Mihrdat), but several modern scholars consider the Iberian diarchy unlikely as it is not corroborated by the contemporary evidence. Pharasmanes is reported to have been the son of his predecessor, King Amazasp I. He is said to have married Ghadana, daughter of King Vologases I of Armenia. According to the medieval Life of Kings, the traditional friendship of the two dyarchy soured at the instigation of the Iranian wife of Mihrdat. Toumanoff regards this information a back-projection of the historically recorded enmity of Pharasmanes I of Iberia and his brother Mithridates of Armenia. The chronicle then continues a story of an Armenian-Roman alliance and their invasion of the Iranian-backed Iberia in which Pharasmanes finds his death.

== Reign ==
The Georgian Royal Annals describe Pharasmanes in the following way:

ფარსმან ქუელი იყო კაცი კეთილი და უხუად მომნიჭებელი და შემნდობელი, ასაკითა შუენიერი, ტანითა დიდი და ძლიერი, მჴნე მჴედარი და შემმართებელი ბრძოლისა, უშიში ვითარცა უჴორცო და ყოვლითავე უმჯობესი ყოველთა მეფეთა ქართლისათა, რომელნი გარდაცვალებულ იყვნეს უწინარეს მისსა.
Pharasmanes the Valiant was a man of kindness and abundance and compassion, beautiful of his age, of big and strong body, courageous horseman and inspirational warrior, fearless as fleshless and all the greater with everything of all the kings of Kartli, who were dead before him.

The contemporary Classical authors, with more solid historical background, focus on Pharasmanes’ uneasy relations with Rome. He refused in 129 to come and pay homage to the emperor Hadrian.

According to the Aelius Spartianus, one of the authors of Augustan History:

And when some of the kings came to him, he treated them in such a way that those who had refused to come regretted it. He took this course especially on account of Pharasmanes, who had haughtily scorned his invitation.

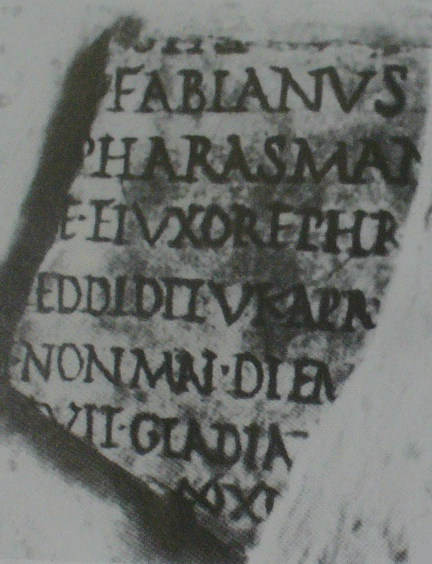
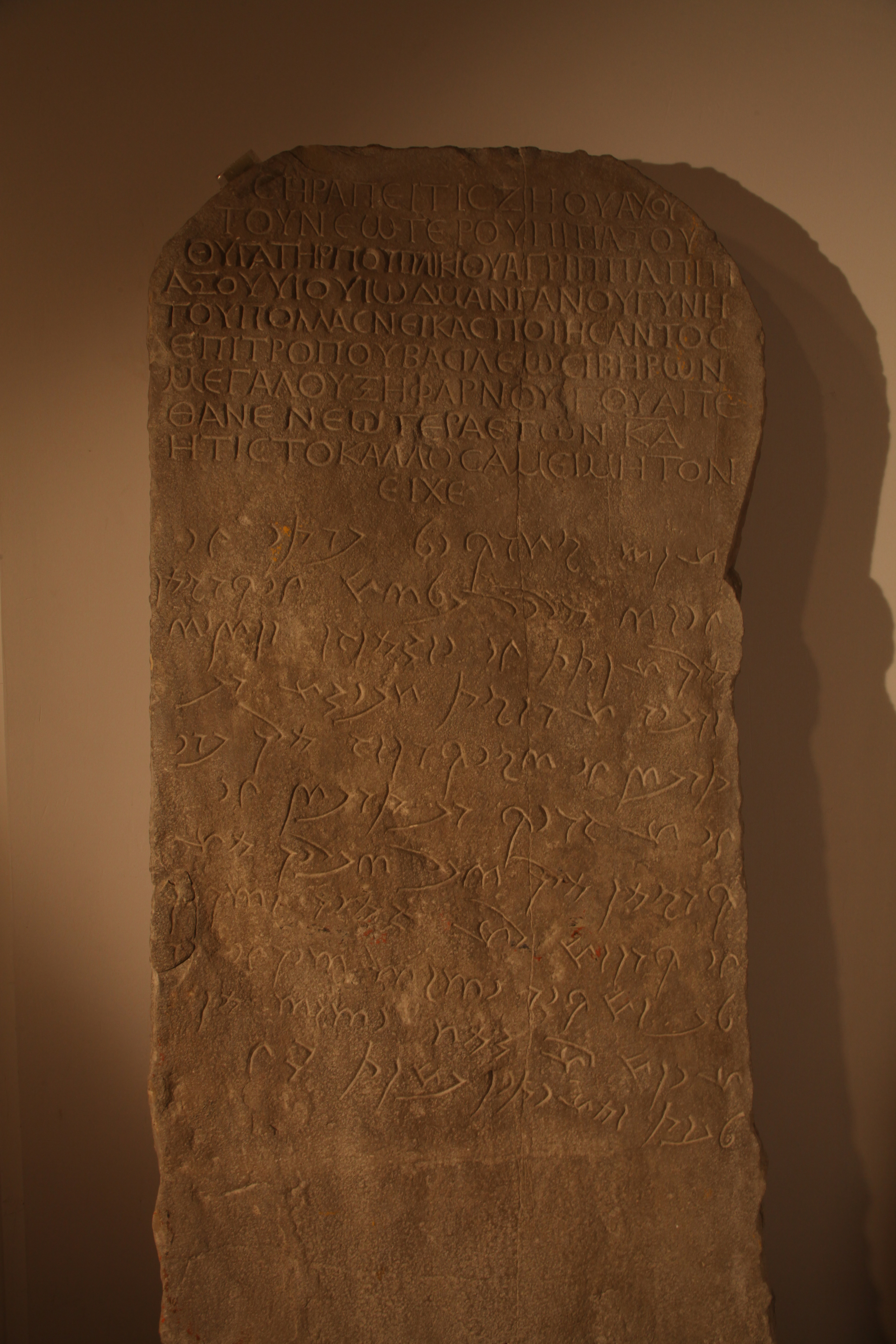
Pharasmanes II mentioned on the Fasti Ostienses (left) and Stele of Serapeitis.

Pharasmanes then went touring the East, and prompted the Alans to attack the neighboring Roman provinces by giving them a passage through his realm, even though the emperor had sent him greater gifts including a war elephant, than to any other king of the East. In his pique, Hadrian dressed some 300 criminals in the gold-embroidered cloaks which were part of the return gift of Pharasmanes, and sent them into the arena.

According to Spartianus:

He showed a multitude of favours to many kings, but from a number he even purchased peace, and by some he was treated with scorn; to many he gave huge gifts, but none greater than to the king of the Iberians, for to him he gave an elephant and a band of fifty men, in addition to magnificent presents. And having himself received huge gifts from Pharasmanes, including some cloaks embroidered with gold, he sent into the arena three hundred condemned criminals dressed in gold-embroidered cloaks as an insult to the king.

Following this, attacks by the nomadic Alans became more frequent; they raided the border regions of Armenia and Atropatene and penetrated as far as Cappadocia. Pharasmanes took advantage of the situation, expanding Iberian influence toward the Black Sea coast. With his assistance, the Alans launched further incursions through Caucasian Albania and Atropatene, crossing Armenia and reaching Roman territories. Vologases I of Armenia sent envoys to Rome to complain about Pharasmanes' aggressive actions, but his complaint was unsuccessful.

Eventually, the ancient sources report a highly honored visit paid by Pharasmanes to Hadrian's successor Antoninus Pius. According to Cassius Dio, he came to Rome as guest of Antoninus Pius, together with his wife, son, and noble retinue where he was especially honored, being allowed to sacrifice in the Capitol and to have his equestrian statue in the temple of Bellona, and also the emperor increased the territory of his kingdom. This Pharasmanes, however, might have been Pharasmanes III, Pharasmanes II's possible grandson. This visit was recorded on a fragment of the Fasti Ostienses.

According to the Georgian royal annals King Pharasmanes was poisoned by the chef sent by the Parthians.

მაშინ სპარსთა გება-ყვეს სიმარჯუე ესე, რამეთუ მოიყვანეს მზარეული ერთი, და აღუთქუეს მას კეთილი დიდი, და რქუეს ესრეთ, ვითარმედ: "წარვედ და შემწყნარე ფარსმან ქუელსა, და წარიტანე შენ თანა წამალი სასიკუდინე, და შეუზავე საჭმელსა თანა მისსა და შეაჭამე". ხოლო წარვიდა მზარეული იგი და ყო ეგრეთ, ვითარცა უთხრეს სპარსთა მათ. და ესრეთ მოკლა ფარსმან მეფე ქუელი.
And then the Persians tried to have some adroitness, and they brought one chef, and promised him great bestowal, and they told him: "Go and serve Pharasmanes the Valiant, and carry with yourself a medicine of death, and mix it with his meal and make him eat it". And a chef went and did so, as the Persians told him to. And that's how he killed Pharasmanes, the valiant king.

== Supposed letter to Hadrian ==
The text now known as De rebus in Oriente mirabilibus purports to be a letter from a Pharasmanes II to Hadrian. Ann Knock argues that, given Hadrian's interest in the marvellous, "a letter from Pharasmanes to Hadrian dealing with the monstrous and the marvellous is ... not at variance with such historical knowledge as we have of the personages named." In arguing for authenticity, some authors have pointed to Hadrian's known interest in the bizarre. Nevertheless, the letter is almost certainly not authentic, but was probably written in Greek sometime between the 2nd and 5th centuries. Álvaro Ibáñez Chacón argues that it was inspired by the description of Hadrian and Pharasmanes in the Historia Augusta and by the Historia's own tendency to literary invention.

== Sources ==
- Braund, David (1991). "Hadrian and Pharasmanes". Klio. 73 (1): 208–219. doi:10.1524/klio.1991.73.73.208.
- Ibáñez Chacón, Álvaro (2022). "La epístola De rebvs in Oriente mirabilibvs: un falso tardoantiguo" (PDF). Antiquité Tardive. 30: 247–259. doi:10.1484/J.AT.5.132664.
- Knock, Ann Elizabeth (1982). Wonders of the East: A Synoptic Edition of the Letter of Pharasmanes and the Old English and Old Picard Translations (PDF) (PhD dissertation). University of London.
- Toumanoff, Cyril (1969). "Chronology of the Early Kings of Iberia". Traditio. 25. Cambridge University Press: 1–33. doi:10.1017/S0362152900010898. S2CID 151472930.

Pharasmanes II Pharnavazid dynasty Died: 132 AD
Preceded by Amazasp I	King of Kartli; 116–132	Succeeded by Ghadam
