= Ghadam =

2nd century king of Iberia

King of Iberia
- Reign: 132–135
- Predecessor: Pharasmanes II
- Successor: Pharasmanes III
- Died: 135
- Issue: Pharasmanes III
- Dynasty: Pharnavazid dynasty
- Father: Pharasmanes II
- Mother: Ghadana of Armenia

Ghadam (Georgian: ღადამი) or Adam (ადამი) was a king (mepe) of Iberia (Kartli, modern eastern Georgia) whose three years of reign are scarcely recorded in the medieval Georgian chronicles. He is otherwise unattested elsewhere. Professor Cyril Toumanoff suggests AD 132–135 as the possible years of Ghadam’s rule. The king’s name is surmised by modern scholars to be a corrupted form of Rhadamistus, not an uncommon name in the ancient Caucasian royal and noble families.

According to the Georgian annals, Ghadam was the son of P’arsman the Good who is the Pharasmanes, king of the Iberians, of Cassius Dio and some other Classical authors. He died after three years of reign, leaving the regency of his one-year-old son, P’arsman, in the hands of his mother Ghadana of Armenia.

Preceded by Pharsman II	King of Iberia; 132–135	Succeeded by Pharsman III
