= Pharasmanes III =

2nd century King of Iberia

King of Iberia
- Reign: 135–185
- Predecessor: Ghadam
- Successor: Amazasp II
- Born: c. 134
- Died: 185
- Issue: Amazasp II; unnamed daughter
- Dynasty: Pharnavazid dynasty
- Father: Ghadam of Iberia

Pharasmanes III or P’arsman III (Georgian: ფარსმან III) was a king (mepe) of Iberia (Kartli, modern central and eastern Georgia), a contemporary of the Roman emperor Antoninus Pius (138–161). Professor Cyril Toumanoff suggests 135–185 AD as the possible years of Pharasmanes’ rule.

According to the medieval Georgian chronicles, P’arsman was one year old at the death of his father, Ghadam (135), whom he succeeded on the throne, and ruled under the regency of his grandmother Ghadana of Armenia until he reached a legal age.

The Classical sources evidence Pharasmanes’ friendly relations with Rome. According to Cassius Dio, he came to Rome as guest of Antoninus Pius, together with his wife, son, and noble retinue; he was especially honored, being allowed to sacrifice in the Capitol and to have his equestrian statue in the temple of Bellona; and the emperor increased the territory of his kingdom. This might have happened in 154 AD After Julius Capitolinus, the trip to Rome has sometimes been, in confusion, attributed to the earlier Iberian king Pharasmanes II.

Preceded by Ghadam	King of Iberia; 135–185	Succeeded by Amazasp II
