= Samara of Mtskheta =

Samara
- Mamasakhlisi of Mtskheta
- Reign: 4th century BC
- Born: Mtskheta, Kartli
- Died: 4th century BC; Mtskheta, Kartli
- Dynasty: Kartlosid
- Religion: Georgian paganism

Samara (Georgian: სამარა, romanized: samara) was a ruler and chieftain ("mamasakhlisi") of Mtskheta in the 4th century BC, with help of Thracian-Macedonian king Lysimachus, he was overthrown by Azo, the son of the king of Aryan Kartli, who united Kartli and made Mtskheta the capital. According to The Georgian Chronicles he was a descendant of Kartlos, the eponymous ancestor of the Georgians. His brother, whose name is not specified, was allegedly massacred at the same time as him, while his wife, took refuge in the mountains with her three children, two daughters and a boy, the future King Pharnavaz I. The latter recovers the heritage of his ancestors and establishing the Kingdom of Iberia.

== Sources ==
- The Georgian Chronicles, Life of Pharnavaz: The first Georgian king of Kartli, Part IV. TITUS (Online Version).
- Rayfield, D. (2013) Edge of Empires: A History of Georgia, Reaktion Books, ISBN 9781780230702
