= Gatsi and Gaim =

Gatsi (Georgian: გაცი) and Gaim (გაიმ; or Ga, გა) were, according to the medieval Georgian chronicles, the deities in a pre-Christian pantheon of ancient Georgians of Kartli (Iberia of the Classical sources). The Georgian hagiographic work "The Life of St. Nino" reports that when St. Nino, a 4th-century female Christian baptizer of Georgians, arrived at the city of Mtskheta, she saw that on the right side of the chief idol of Armazi "there stood another image, made of gold, with the face of a man. Its name was Gatsi, and on the left of it was a silver idol with a human face, the name of which was Gaim." Another passage from the medieval chronicle relates that Gatsi and Ga(im) were believed to have governed "all of mysteries."

Beyond the passages from the medieval Georgian annals, we lack contemporary records and archaeological evidence about these cults, however. Both these deities, reportedly brought by the semi-legendary ruler Azoy from his original homeland Arian-Kartli, may have been a version of the Anatolian Attis and Cybele.
