= Pharnavaz I =

King of Iberia and Colchis

- King of Iberia and Colchis
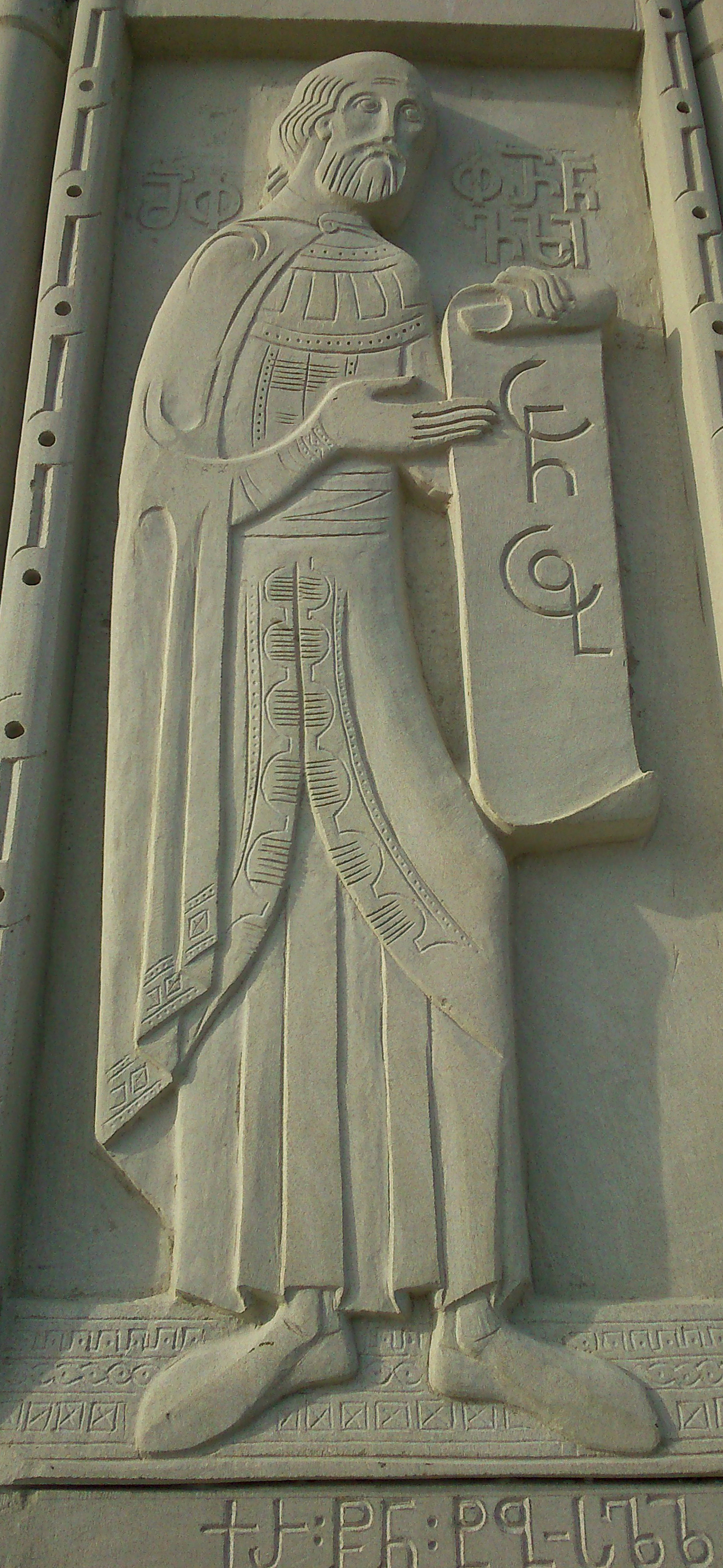
- Relief of Pharnavaz I

King of Iberia
- Reign: 302–237 BC; 299–234 BC; 284–219 BC
- Predecessor: Azo of Iberia (office created)
- Successor: Sauromaces I
- Born: 329, 326 or 311 BC; Mtskheta, Kartli
- Died: 237, 234 or 219 BC (aged 92); Mtskheta, Kingdom of Iberia
- Burial: Armazi, Kingdom of Iberia (undisclosed)
- Spouse: Durdzuk woman
- Issue: Sauromaces I
- Dynasty: Pharnavazid
- Father: Georgian prince
- Mother: Persian woman
- Religion: Georgian paganism (God Armazi) (Self-deification)

Pharnavaz I (/fɑːrnɑːvɑːz/) was a king (mepe) of Kartli, an ancient Georgian kingdom known as Iberia in classical antiquity. The Georgian Chronicles credits him with being the first monarch founding the kingship of Kartli and the Pharnavazid dynasty, while other independent chronicles, such as The Conversion of Kartli make him the second Georgian monarch. Based on the medieval evidence, most scholars locate Pharnavaz's rule in the 3rd century BC: 302–237 BC according to Prince Vakhushti of Kartli, 299–234 BC according to Cyril Toumanoff and 284–219 BC according to Pavle Ingoroqva. Pharnavaz's rise, advent and expansion of the Iberian monarchy was directly tied to the victory of Alexander the Great over the Achaemenid Empire. Pharnavaz ruled under the suzerainty of the Seleucid Empire.

== Life ==
According to the Georgian royal annals, Pharnavaz descended from Uplos, son of Mtskhetos, son of Kartlos, who was one of the powerful and famous eight brothers, who from their part were descendants of Targamos, son of Tarsi, the grandson of Japheth, son of the Biblical Noah. He is not directly attested in non-Georgian sources and there is no definite contemporary indication that he was indeed the first of the Georgian kings. His story is saturated with legendary imagery and symbols, and it seems feasible that, as the memory of the historical facts faded, the real Pharnavaz "accumulated a legendary façade" and emerged as the model pre-Christian monarch in the Georgian annals.

According to the c. 800 chronicle The Life of Kings, Pharnavaz had a distinguished genealogy, tracing back to Kartlos, the mythical ethnarch of Kartli. His paternal uncle, Samara, held the position of mamasakhlisi ("father of the house") of the Georgian tribes around Mtskheta. Pharnavaz's mother is claimed to have been a Persian woman from Gabai, whom Prince Teimuraz of Georgia and Patriarch Anton I of Georgia identify with a daughter of King Darius III. The entire story of Pharnavaz, although written by a Christian chronicler, abounds in ancient Iranian-like imagery and mystic allusions, a reflection of the archaeologically confirmed cultural and presumably political ties between Iran and Kartli of that time. The name "Pharnavaz" is also an illustrative example with its root par- being based upon the Persian farnah, the divine radiance believed by the ancient Iranians to mark a legitimate dynast (cf. khvarenah). The dynastic tag Parnavaziani ("of/from/named for Pharnavaz") is also preserved in the early Armenian histories as P'arnawazean (Faustus of Byzantium 5.15; fifth century) and P'arazean (History of Armenia 14; probably the early fifth century), an acknowledgment that a king named Pharnavaz was understood to have been the founder of a Georgian dynasty. Pharnavaz is also mentioned in the Stele of Serapit.

Perhaps the most artistically rounded section of the Georgian annals, the narrative follows Pharnavaz's life from birth to burial. Aged 3, small Pharnavaz's family is destroyed, and his heritage is usurped by Azon installed by Alexander the Great during his campaign in Kartli. Alexander's invasion of Iberia, remembered not only by the Georgian historical tradition, but also by Pliny the Elder (4.10.39) and Gaius Julius Solinus (9.19), appears to be memory of some Macedonian interference in Iberia, which must have taken place in connection with the expedition mentioned by Strabo (11.14.9) sent by Alexander in 323 BC to the confines of Iberia, in search of gold mines.

Pharnavaz is brought up fatherless, but a magic dream, in which he anoints himself with the essence of the Sun, heralds the peripeteia. He is persuaded by this vision to "devote [himself] to noble deeds". He then sets off and goes hunting. In a pursuit of a deer, he encounters a mass of treasure stored in a hidden cave. Pharnavaz retrieves the treasure and exploits it to mount a loyal army against the tyrannical Azon. He is aided by Kuji of Colchis, who eventually marries Pharnavaz's sister. The rebels are also joined by 1,000 soldiers from Azon's camp; they are anachronistically referred to by the author as Romans, and claimed to have been entitled by the victorious Pharnavaz as aznauri (i.e., nobles) after Azon (this etymology is false, however).

The main threads of Pharnavaz's story - a fatherless boy hidden and raised in a remote mountains, a forgotten lineage, his dreams, sacral kingship, solar imagery, the hunt, discovery of cave-concealed treasure etc. are reminiscent of legends about Iran's founding kings, like Cyrus the Great and Ardashir I. Pharnavaz's self-anointment may have been a later Sasanian inspiration, as some early Shahanshahs crowned themselves.

== Reign ==
The kingdom's borders per the Georgian royal annals.

In the ensuing battle, Azon is defeated and killed, and Pharnavaz becomes the king of Kartli at the age of 27. He is reported to have acknowledged the suzerainty of the Seleucids, the Hellenistic successors of Alexander in the Middle East, who are afforded by the Georgian chronicles the generic name of Antiochus.

ფარნავაზ წარავლინნა მოციქულნი წინაშე მეფისა ანტიოქოს ასურასტანისა, და წარსცა ძღუენი დიდ-ძალი. და აღუთქუა მას მსახურება, და ითხოვა მისგან შეწევნა ბერძენთა ზედა. ხოლო ანტიოქოს შეიწყნარა ძღუენი მისი, და უწოდა შვილად თჳსად, და წარმოსცა გჳრგჳნი.
Pharnavaz sent his apostles towards the King Antiochus of Assyria, and gave him huge gifts. And promised to serve him, and asked him for help against the Greeks. And Antiochus received his gifts, and called him a son, and gave him the crown.

Pharnavaz is also said to have patterned his administration upon an "Iranian" model.

ესრეთ განაწესა ესე ყოველი ფარნავაზ მიმსგავსებულად სამეფოსა სპარსთასა.
And here Pharnavaz made all and everything alike the Kingdom of the Persians. (i.e. the Achaemenid Empire.)

Pharnavaz had introduced a military-administrative organization based on a network of regional governors or eristavi. The insignia of the eristavi, received from the king, constituted a sceptre, a special signet ring, belt and armament. Iberia had in total seven eristavis, in Colchis, Kakheti, Khunani (modern-day northern Azerbaijan), Samshvilde (Kvemo Kartli), Tsunda (included Javakheti, Kola and Artaani), Odzrkhe and Klarjeti. The kingdom had one spaspet who was under the direct control of the royal power based in Inner Kartli. Eristavates mimicked aspects of Achaemenid satrapies and Seleucid strategoi. The major motive of later historian of the chronicles was to convince posterity that the basic political structure of Kartli was created by the very first Georgian monarch in the wake of Wars of Alexander the Great; was of Achaemenid administrative system and had remained stable throughout Hellenistic, Parthian and Sasanian times. In this way, the long-term viability and stability of the Georgian realm are established.

The hierarchic structure created by Pharnavaz was the following: king; commander-in-chief (spaspet) of the royal army; eristavis; middle commanders (atasistavis tsikhistavis) of the garrisons stationed in the royal strongholds; junior commanders (asistavis) who were the younger sons of the aristocratic families; mercenary professional warriors from the neighboring countries and all the soldiers organized around the entire kingdom.

It is evident that the division of Iberia by Pharnavaz into saeristavos served first and foremost a military aim, namely the organization of people for the purpose of defence. This organization was not so much directed against other countries. Back then the total population of the kingdom would have been, including foreign captives and the population of the tributary areas, about 600,000, which could raise a fairly big army not less than 100,000. According to Strabo the Iberian army numbered 70–80,000 so it appears that each saeristavo had 10,000 soldiers.

While Georgian and Classical evidence makes the contemporaneous Kartlian links with the Seleucids plausible (Toumanoff has even implied that the kings of Kartli might have aided the Seleucids in holding the resurgent Orontids of Armenia in check), Pharnavaz's alleged reform of the eristavi fiefdoms is most likely a back-projection of the medieval pattern of subdivision to the remote past.

Pharnavaz is then reported to have embarked on social and cultural projects; he supervised two building projects: the raising of the idol Armazi – reputedly named after him – on a mountain ledge and the construction of a similarly named fortress.

Pharnavaz made alliances with various North Caucasian peoples during his reign, to whom he called upon for help against both Macedonia and internal foes. He took a Durdzuk woman in marriage, in order to consolidate the alliance of Iberia with the Durdzuks, who helped him consolidate his reign against his unruly vassals. Similarly he married his sister to a Sarmatian chief.

According to the Georgian royal annals he also created the Georgian script and made the Georgian language an official language of the kingdom:

და ესე ფარნავაზ იყო პირველი მეფე ქართლსა შინა ქართლოსისა ნათესავთაგანი. ამან განავრცო ენა ქართული, და არ-ღა-რა იზრახებოდა სხუა ენა ქართლსა შინა თჳნიერ ქართულისა. და ამან შექმნა მწიგნობრობა ქართული. და მოკუდა ფარნავაზ, და დაფლეს წინაშე არმაზისა კერპისა.
And here Pharnavaz was first king of Kartli from race of Kartlos. He spread the Georgian language, and there was no language but Georgian only in land of Kartli. And he created the Georgian script. And died Pharnavaz, and he was buried in front of Armazi.

The chronicles report Pharnavaz's lengthy reign of 65 years.

ამან ფარნავაზ მოზღუდა ქალაქი მცხეთა მტკიცედ, და ყოველნი ქალაქნი და ციხენი ქართლისანი, მოოჴრებულნი ალექსანდრესგან, ამან აღაშენნა. და ვერ-ღა-რა იძიეს შური ბერძენთა მის ზედა, რამეთუ უცალო იყვნეს ბერძენნი ბრძოლისაგან ჰრომთასა.
Pharnavaz took the city of Mtskheta firmly, and all the cities and castles of Kartli, destroyed by Alexander, he rebuilt them. And the Greeks could not avenge upon him, as the Greeks had warriors no more, because they fought in Rome.

Upon his death, he was buried in front of the idol Armazi and worshipped. His son Sauromaces I succeeded him to the throne.

Pharnavaz's grave is undisclosed so far. One of the last monarchs who visited his grave to adorn it and pay his respects was King Mirian III. Pharnavaz's very burial in front of idol Armazi suggests a Hellenistic deification of the early monarchs of Iberia.

== Pharnavaz and Arrian's Pharasmanes ==
Several modern scholars have been tempted to make identification between the Pharnavaz of the medieval Georgian tradition and the Pharasmanes of the Greco-Roman historian Arrian, a 2nd-century AD author of The Anabasis of Alexander. Arrian recounts that "Pharasmanes (Фαρασμάνης), king of the Chorasmians", visited Alexander the Great with 1500 horseman, and pledged his support should Alexander desire to campaign to the Euxine lands and subdue Colchians, whom Pharasmanes names as his neighbors. Apart from the similarity of the names of Pharasmanes and Pharnavaz (both names are apparently based on the same root, the Iranian farnah), the king of Chorasmia in Central Asia reports Colchis (today's western Georgia, i.e., the western neighbor of ancient Kartli/Iberia) to be a neighboring country. Some Georgian scholars have suggested that the Greek copyists of Arrian might have confused Chorasmia with Cholarzene (Chorzene), a Classical rendering of the southwest Georgian marchlands (the medieval Tao-Klarjeti), which indeed bordered with Colchis and Pontus.

According to Arrian:

At this time also came Pharasmanes, king of the Chorasmians, to Alexander with 1500 horsemen, who affirmed that he dwelt on the confines of the nations of the Colchians and the women called Amazons, and promised, if Alexander was willing to march against these nations in order to subjugate the races in this district whose territories extended to the Black Sea, to act as his guide through the mountains and to supply his army with provisions. Alexander then gave a courteous reply to the men who had come from the Scythians, and one that was adapted to the exigencies of that particular time; but said that he had no desire for a Scythian wedding. He thanked Pharasmanes and concluded a friendship and alliance with him, saying that at present it was not convenient for him to march towards the Black Sea. After introducing Pharasmanes as a friend to Artabazos II of Phrygia, to whom he had intrusted the government of the Bactrians, and to all the other viceroys who were his neighbors, he sent him back to his own abode. He told Pharasmanes that his mind at that time was engrossed by the desire of conquering India; for when he had subdued them, he should possess the whole of Asia. He added that when Asia was in his power he would return to Greece, and thence make an expedition with all his naval and military forces to the eastern part of the Black Sea through the Hellespont and Propontis. And he desired Pharasmanes to reserve the fulfilment of his present promises until then.

== Legacy ==
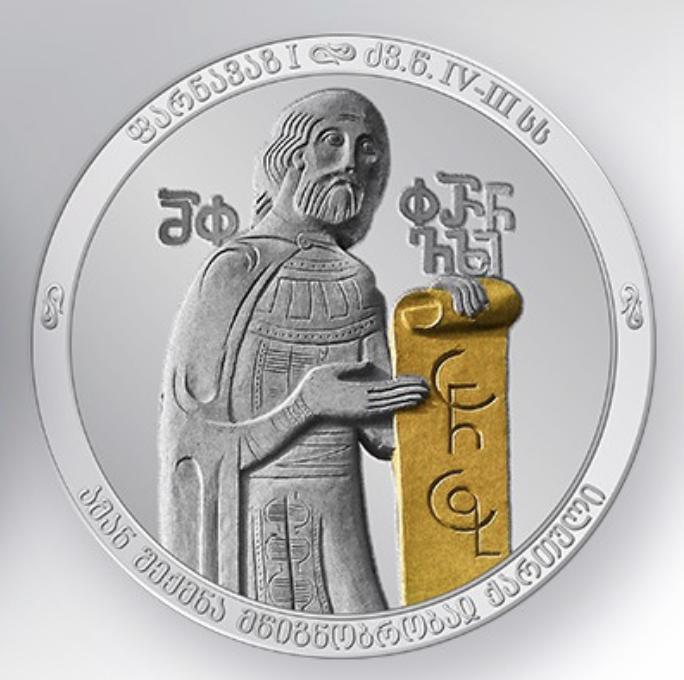
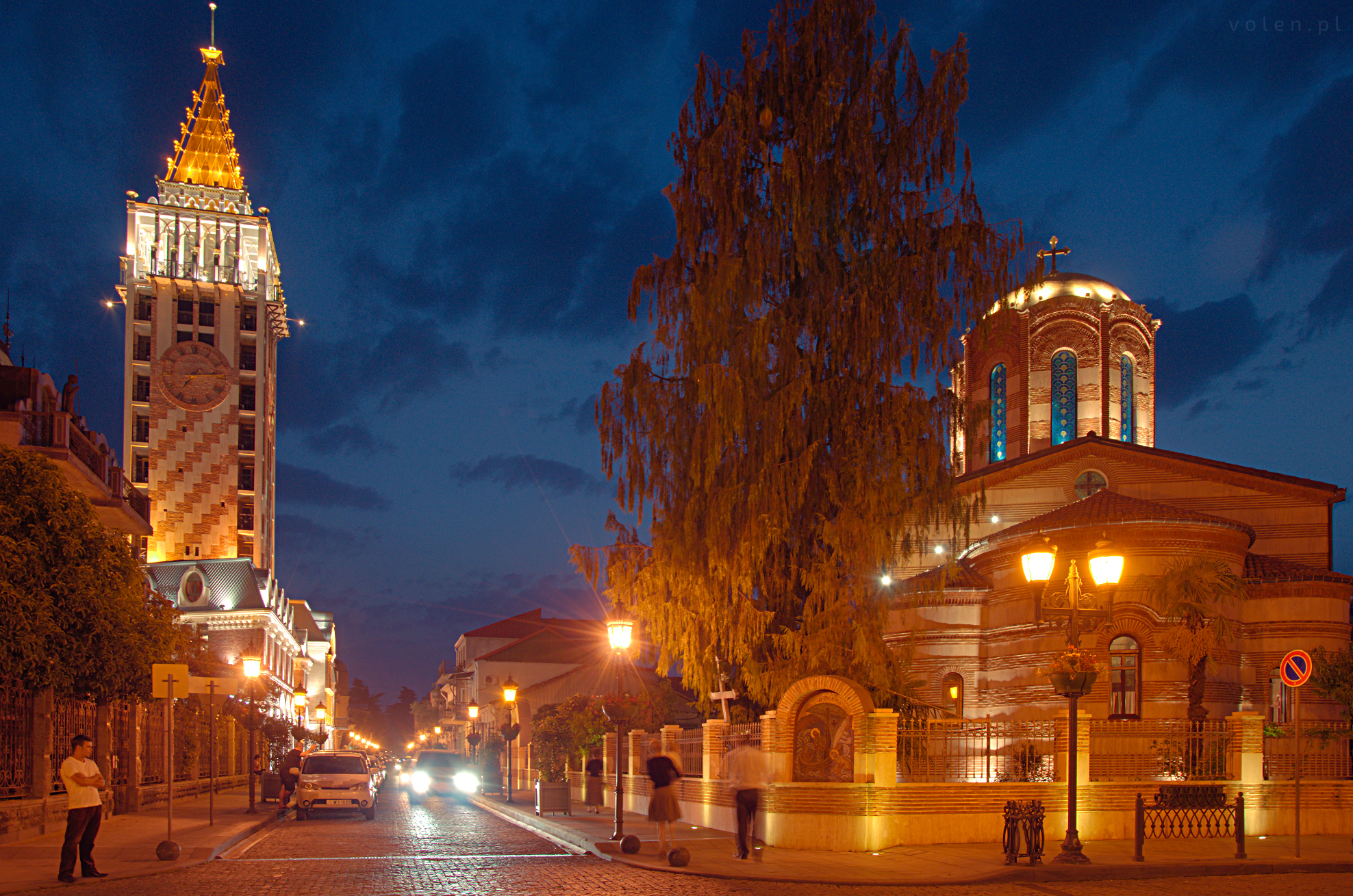
A commemorative coin of a king by the National Bank of Georgia (left) and street that bears his name in Batumi.

The Bagrationi dynasty claimed descent directly from Pharnavaz. During the continuity of monarchy in Georgia, the Georgian kings presented themselves as heirs to the Kingdom of Iberia founded by King Pharnavaz.

In Tbilisi there is a King Pharnavaz Street, Avenue, and also a statue of Pharnavaz. Also, there are streets named after Pharnavaz in Batumi, Kutaisi, Khashuri, Gori, Gurjaani, Sachkhere, Zestaponi and others. Some buildings, including schools and hotels, also bear his name, as well as about five hundred Georgians.

== See also ==
- Pharnavazid dynasty
- Georgian monarchs family tree of Iberia

== Notes ==
1. Also transliterated as Parnavaz, Farnavaz, Pharnabaz, Pharnabaze, Pharnabazo, Pharnabazus or Pharnaoz
2. According to Prince Vakhushti of Kartli
3. According to Cyril Toumanoff
4. According to Pavle Ingoroqva
5. This account is now considered legendary, and is rejected by scholarly consensus, as no archaeological confirmation has been found so far. An alternative interpretation of this tradition is the pre-Christian use of foreign scripts (alloglottography in Aramaic alphabet) to write down Georgian texts. The existence of a peculiar local form of Aramaic in pre-Christian Georgia has been archaeologically documented.

== Bibliography ==
- Rapp, Stephen H. (2003). Studies In Medieval Georgian Historiography: Early Texts And Eurasian Contexts. Peeters Bvba. ISBN 90-429-1318-5.
- Rapp, Stephen H. (2014). The Sasanian World through Georgian Eyes: Caucasia and the Iranian Commonwealth in Late Antique Georgian Literature. Ashgate Publishing.
- Georgian royal annals, Life of Pharnavaz: The first Georgian king of Kartli, Part IV. TITUS (Online Version).
- Rayfield, Donald (2000). The Literature of Georgia: A History. Routledge. ISBN 0-7007-1163-5.
- Rayfield, Donald (2013). Edge of Empires: A History of Georgia. Reaktion Books.
- Suny, Ronald Grigor (1994). The Making of the Georgian Nation (2nd ed.). Indiana University Press. ISBN 0-253-20915-3.
- Toumanoff, Cyril (1963). Studies in Christian Caucasian History. Georgetown University Press.
- Salia, Kalistrat (1980). Histoire de la nation géorgienne.
- Gamkrelidze, Gela (2012). Braund, David (ed.). Researches in Iberia-Colchology.

Pharnavaz I Pharnavazid dynasty Born: 326 BC Died: 234 BC
Preceded by Azon (office created)	King of Kartli; 299 BC - 234 BC	Succeeded by Saurmag I
