= Kuji of Colchis =

Kuji (fl. 4th century BC) was a ruler and eristavi of Colchis. During his reign his castle of Nokalakevi was built. Kuji aided Pharnavaz I of Iberia against the tyrannical ruler Azo. Pharnavaz subsequently deposed and killed Azo and Kuji recognized his authority giving him the Colchian throne.

According to The Georgian Chronicles:

You are son of the heads of Kartli, and you should reign over me, and your race should be here, and strength you should have, you are our Lord, and I shall be your servant. შენ ხარ შვილი თავთა მათ ქართლისათა, და შენ გმართებს უფლობა ჩემი აწ ნუ შურობ ხუასტაგსა შენსა, რათა განვამრავლნეთ სპანი; და უკეთუ მოგუეცეს ძლევა, შენ ხარ უფალი ჩუენი და მე ვარ მონა შენი.

Kuji eventually married Pharnavaz's sister. This marriage would produce the progeny of Kartam of Colchis.

== Bibliography ==
- Georgian Chronicles, Life of Kartli, chronicle
