= Kartam of Colchis =

Kartam (Georgian: ქართამი) was a Pharnavazid eristavi of Colchis and prince of the Kingdom of Iberia in the 1st century BC.

Kartam was a descendant of Kuji of Colchis from his marriage on a sister of Pharnavaz I of Iberia. Kartam was adopted by King Pharnavaz II. He married Pharnavaz's daughter and had two sons: Pharasmanes I and Mithridates. Kartam died in 33 BC.
