= Azo of Iberia =

4th century BC ruler of Kartli (Iberia)

Azo, Azoy or Azon (Georgian: აზო; აზოჲ; აზონი) was a ruler of Georgians of ancient Kartli (Iberia of the Classical authors) claimed by medieval Georgian annals to have been installed by Alexander the Great, king of Macedon (r. 336–323 BC).

== Medieval tradition ==
His name and origin are differently given by the medieval Georgian chronicles. While The Conversion of Kartli calls him Azo(y) and makes him the scion of a preexisting dynasty in Arian Kartli, The Life of Kartli knows him as Azon and brands him a Macedonian outsider. Azo and Azon unquestionably represent the same figure and both sources credit his position to Alexander’s mythic expedition into inner Georgia.

According to The Conversion of Kartli, Azo was the son of an unnamed king of Arian Kartli, who was brought, together with followers, to Kartli proper by Alexander and installed as the first king (mep'e, მეფე) at Mtskheta after the conquest of this city. He also transplanted the cults of Gatsi and Gaim to Kartli. The Life of Kartli enshrines no such tradition. Rather, it maintains that Azon, son of Iaredos (unattested in The Conversion of Kartli), was neither a king nor even a Georgian. He is reported to have conquered Mtskheta with 100,000 Macedonians ("Romans"). In addition, Alexander commanded Azon to worship seven celestial bodies (the Sun, the Moon, and five "stars", i.e., planets) and to serve the "invisible God, the creator of the universe". This version has Azon, depicted as a tyrant, subsequently deposed and killed by Pharnavaz, the member of the local ruling clan (P’arnavaziani), whose father and uncle were killed by Azon.

== Modern interpretation ==
The identification of Azo/Azon is one of the most complex and contentious enigmas of early Georgian history. His rule is conventionally dated by the Georgian scholar Sergi Gorgadze to 330–272 BC, though this chronology lacks precision.

Despite their differences, the two medieval traditions concur that kingship was established in Mtskheta in the early Hellenistic period and this is verified in non-Georgian sources. The legend of Alexander's Iberian campaign has also been preserved in Armenian historical tradition, particularly in The History of the Armenians by Moses of Chorene (probably the 5th century). Moses speaks of "Mithridates, satrap of Darius" (identifiable with Mithridates II of Cius) installed by Alexander to rule over the Georgians. Professor Giorgi Melikishvili has drawn several parallels between the stories of the Azon of the Georgian chronicles and the Mithridates of the Armenian tradition.

Several modern scholars believe Azo’s story indirectly suggests the migration of the early Georgian tribes to the northwest and blending of Anatolian elements with the tribes living in Kartli proper. On the other hand, the version of The Life of Kartli, which anachronistically refers to Azon's entourage as "Romans", might well have reflected the Roman activities in Iberia, presumably those of the Flavian period (AD 69–96), which have surprisingly been ignored by the Georgian annals.

Some modern historians have also attempted to equate Azon (note that the name terminates in the Greek suffix –ου) with the Jason of the Argonautic cycle. According to the Roman historian Tacitus, the Iberians "claimed Thessalian origin, dating from the time when Jason, after leaving with Medea and their children, returned to the empty palace of Aeëtes and the kingless Colchians".
