= Bebris tsikhe =

Medieval fortress in Kartli, Georgia

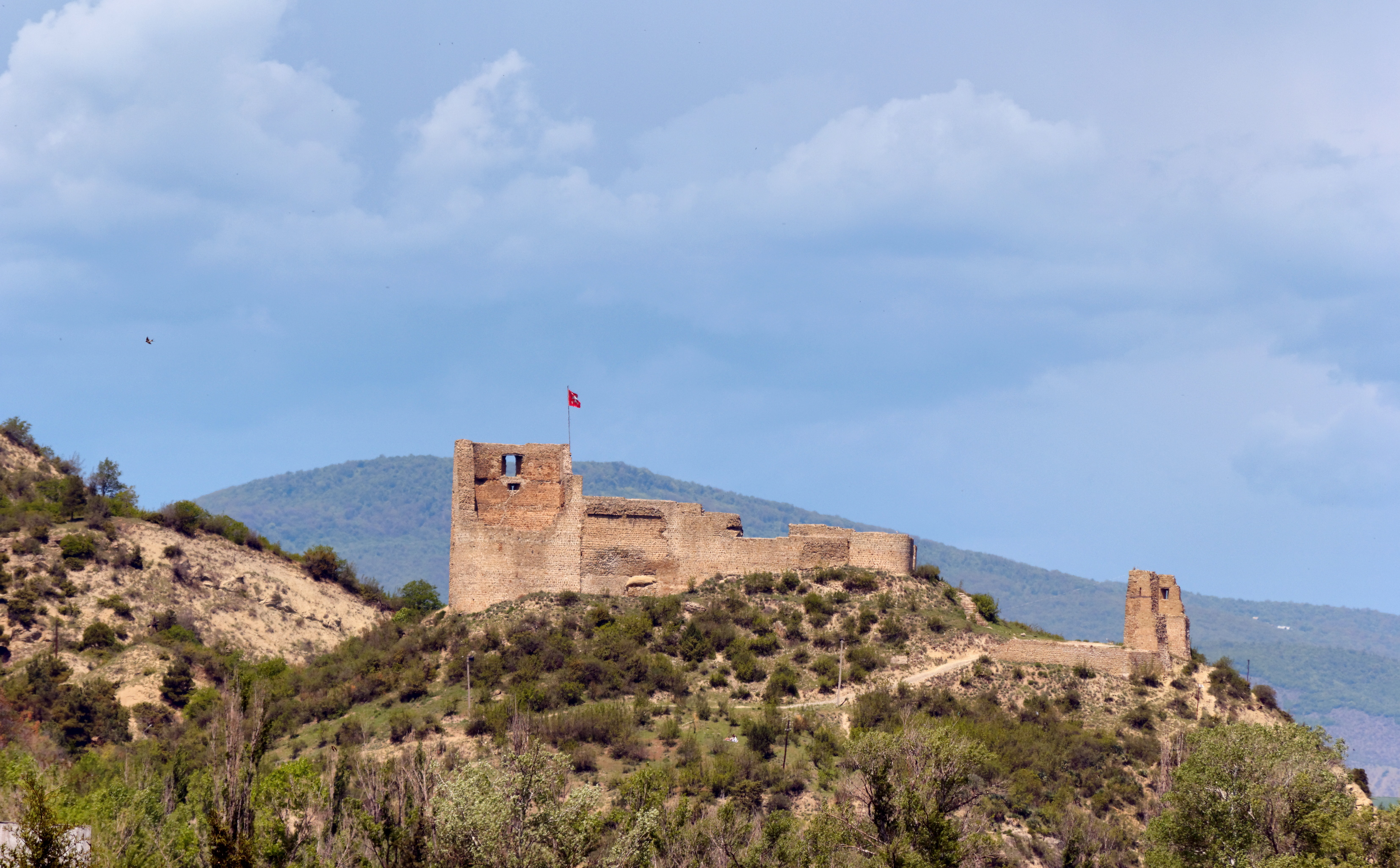

Bebris Tsikhe is an early medieval fortress in Georgia in the historical region of Kartli, Mtskheta. It situated on the right bank of the river Aragvi, on the north of Mtskheta. In ancient times, the fortress was called ″Belti″. Prince Vakhushti of Kartli calls it ″Beltistsikhe″. The fortress was built to protect Mtskheta and Tbilisi from the north, from the side of the Greater Caucasus Range.

The fortress naturally fits into the landscape, built to imitate a continuation of the mountain. The walls, over 2 m thick, are built with almost equal-size stones. The fortress has two levels: a citadel and a lower courtyard. The citadel has a triangular shape. Three towers were erected at each corner of the triangle. The eastern tower originally had square shape, but it was destroyed and rebuilt in 18th century. The southwestern tower was the largest and also served as a dungeon. It has four levels with embrasures, split by wooden ceilings. The walls of the lower courtyard are largely in ruins, but the fortress obviously had a multifaceted shape, stemming from the complicated terrain. Its only tower was built from the east side to protect from the former road side. A part of the tower wall still remains. In the neighborhood of Bebris Tsikhe, archeological layers of ancient and feudal periods are identified.

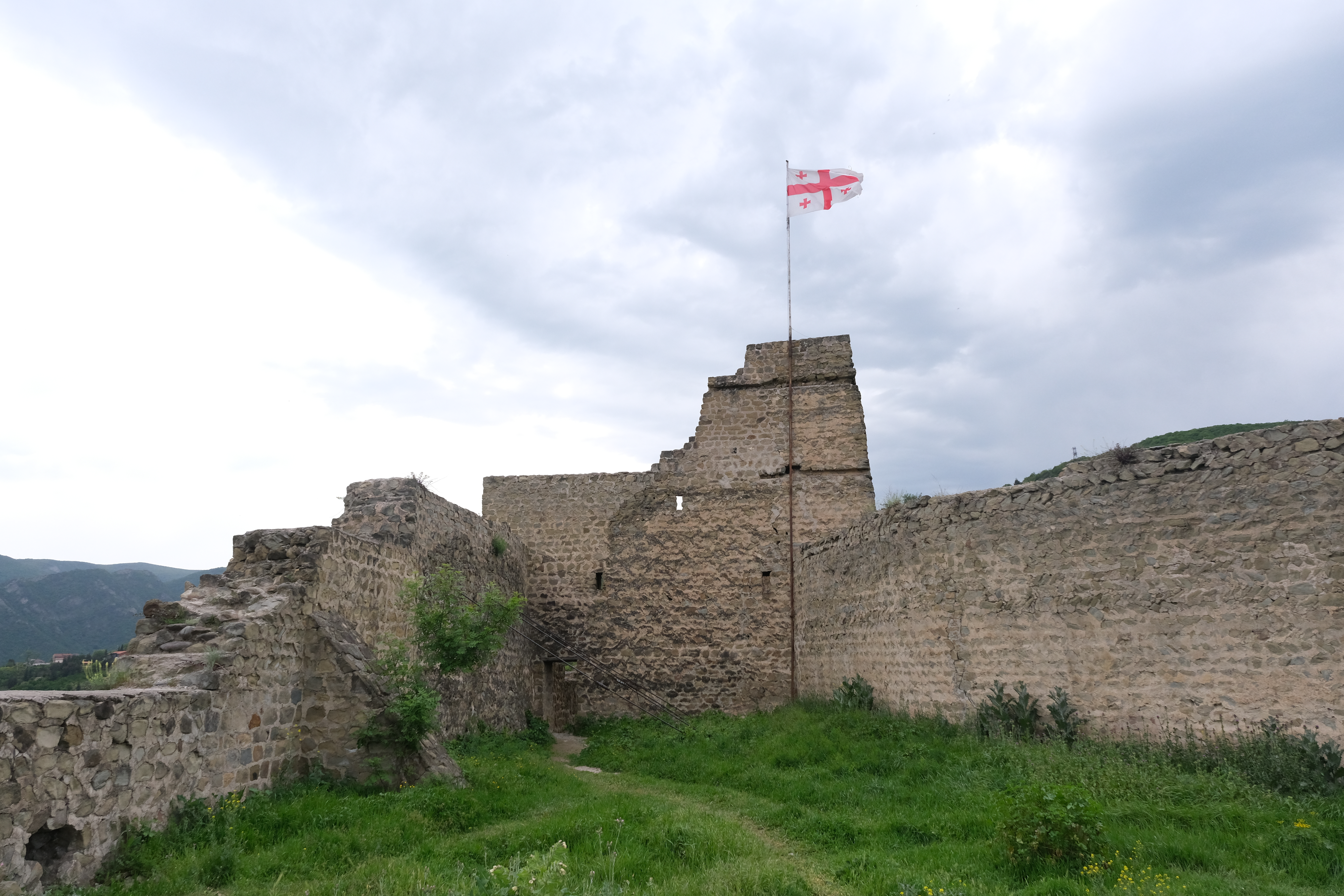
Interior view of fortress

There is no written document about the origin of the fortress'es name. A legend about Bebris Tsikhe says that this territory once belonged to a prince called Simon, who built the fortress in a narrow part of the ravine and put guards inside it. He had a pretty and kind daughter – Makrine, and a cruel and heartless son Mamuka. After the death of his father, Mamuka imposed an enormous tax on peasants. All those who were not able to pay a tax were tortured cruelly by Mamuka. In vain did the kind-hearted Makrine beg her brother to have mercy of the peasants. The cruel brother didn't have a pity for her and imprisoned her in a tower. Once, while peasants were making watery meal in a huge saucepan, two crows unexpectedly came over, flew into the saucepan and were boiled in it. The peasants threw the meal away. When Mamuka learned about it he got very angry and was about to whip them, but in this very moment, from the saucepan emerged snakes who twisted around him. Desperate Mamuka prayed God: ″Just save me and I’ll build a church in your name.″ Makrine watched her brother’s troubles from the window, who also prayed to God to save him. Merciful God accepted prayers and set Mamuka free from snakes. Saved Mamuka gave away his fortune, became a monk and began to collect donation for a church construction. His sister Makrine became a nun in Mtskheta. Many years having passed, when Makrine died, a white-bearded old man came to her funeral came, gave a kiss to the deceased and said: ″My sister, we kept our promise″. As soon as he pronounced those words he fell on his knees and gave his soul to God. Since then, the fortress is called ″Bebris Tsikhe″ (Fortress of an old man).

The road was originally passing by the east side of the fortress, along the river bank. In the 19th century, a new road was cut through the mountain, circumventing Bebris Tsikhe by the west.

In 2004, Bebris Tsikhe was earmarked as one of the National Cultural Monuments of Georgia.

== Literature ==
- Bebris tsikhe// Georgia:encyclopedia -Tbilisi.,1997. pg. 386
- Bebris tsikhe – Beltis tsikhe // description of Georgian historical and cultural monuments -Tbilisi., 1990, pg. 242
- Закарая, П. (1983) Памятники Восточной Грузии. Искусство, Москва, 376 с. (In Russian)
