= Slavery in Georgia (country) =

Map of Caucasus Region 1490

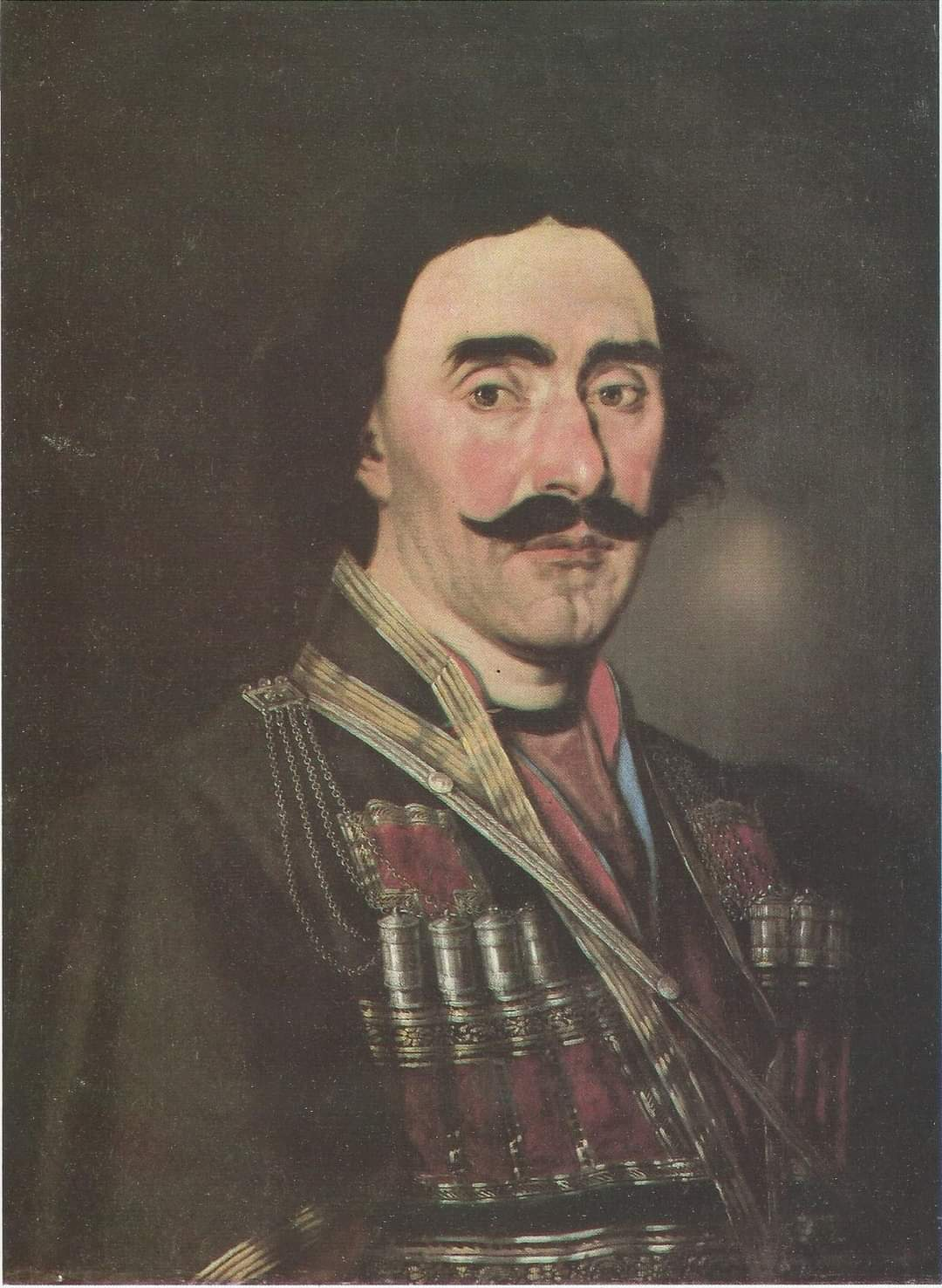
Solomon I the Great, king of Imereti

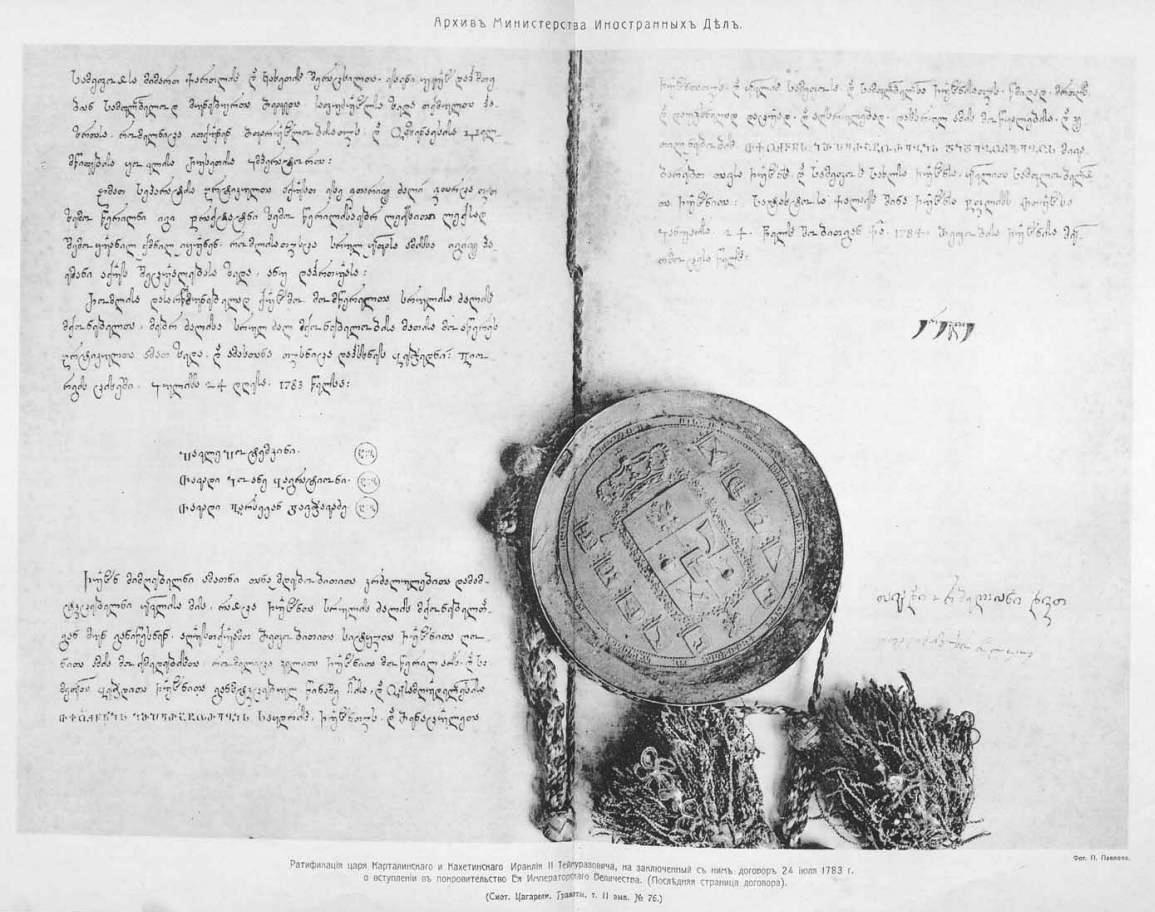
Treaty of Georgievsk of 1783 (Esadze, 1913)

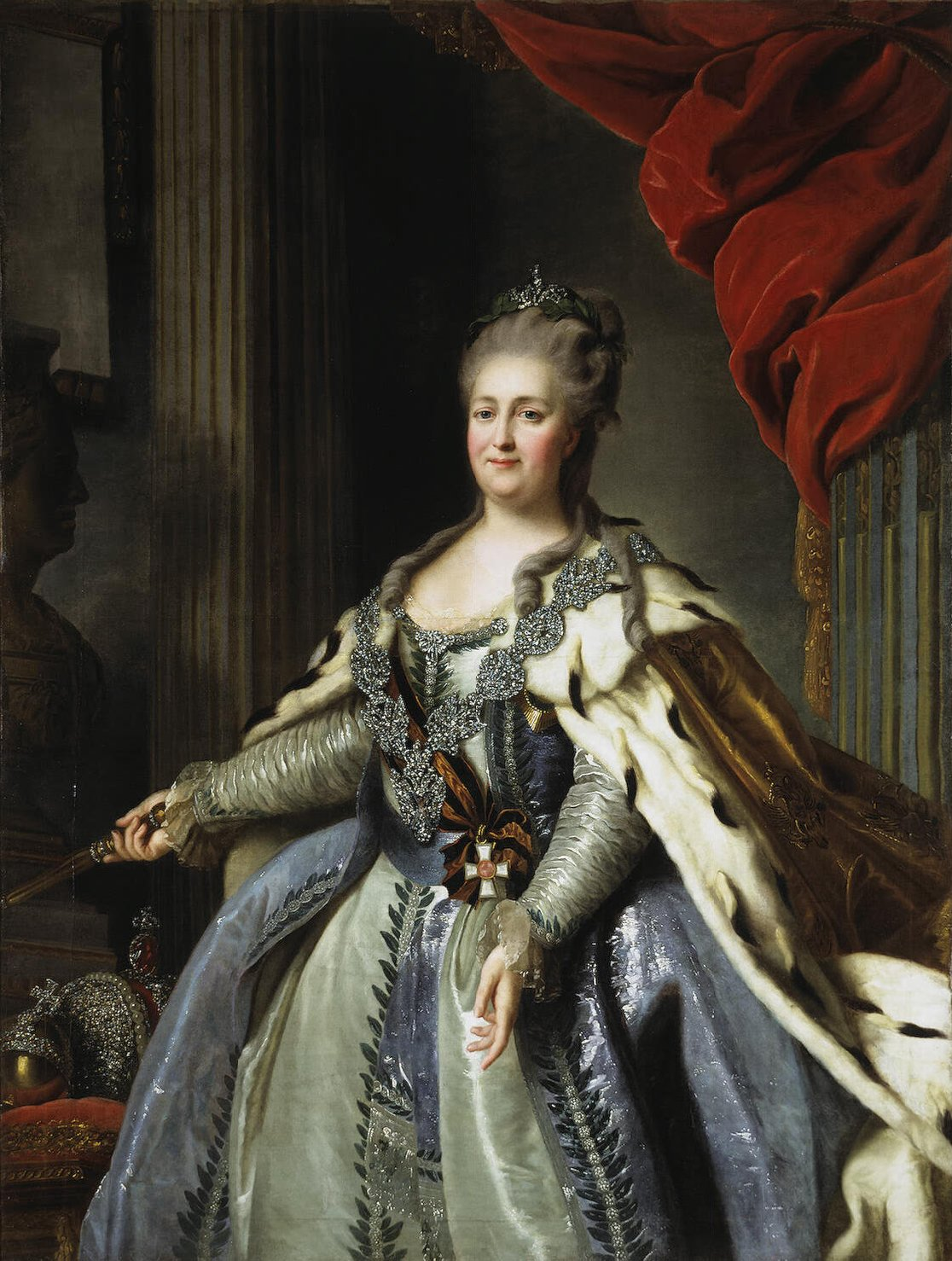
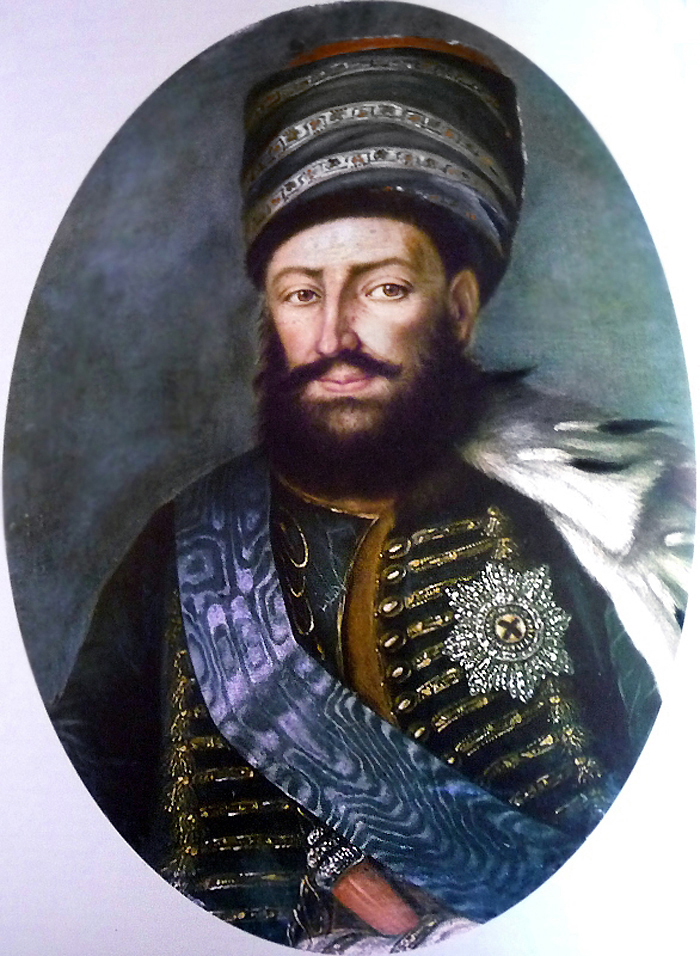
Signatories of the Treaty of Georgievsk: Catherine II of the Russian Empire and Heraclius II of Kartli-Kakheti

Slavery in Georgia refer to the history of slavery in the area that was later to form the nation of Georgia.

There are limited information about slavery in Ancient Georgia. However, Georgia close to the ancient Black Sea slave trade, which affected Georgia for centuries. From the Middle Ages, Georgia became a Christian country surrounded by Muslim lands, which made it defined as infidel kafir of Dar al-Harb and therefore vulnerable to Islamic slave raids. During the early modern age, Georgia was a weak religious border zone, politically split between an Eastern part who was tribute state to Iran, and a Western part that was a tributary state of the Ottoman Empire, and forced to deliver tributary slaves to both Islamic empires. Georgia also participated in the Black Sea slave trade.

In the late 18th century, Russia took the slave trade as an excuse to intervene and eventually conquer Georgia. The Russian anti-slavery campaign was the official policy when Georgia became a part of Russia in 1801–1802, but it was arbitrarily enforced and the success was slow. Not until the 1850s had Georgia's open participation in the Black Sea slave trade ended, and the remaining slave trade of the mountain tribes in the Caucasus was finally eradicated in the 1860s.

== Slave trade ==
Georgia had a coast along the Black Sea, which made it a participant of the ancient Black Sea slave trade. However, there is little information about the slave trade of Georgia during antiquity. Prior to the Russian conquest in 1801, slave trade was an old rooted custom with both diplomatic as well as economic functions in the Caucasus and Georgia.

There is more information about the participation of Georgia in the Black Sea slave trade during the Middle Ages and the early modern age. By that time period, the slave trade in Georgia was focused on trade to the Muslim world. Georgia was a Christian state surrounded by Muslim states, with the Ottoman Empire in the South and West and Persia to the East. As a religious and political border zone, Georgia was vulnerable to slave trade and slave raids. The Islamic law regarding Islamic views on slavery legitimized enslavement by purchase of already enslaved people from middleman slave traders; by children born from two enslaved parents or from a slave mother without an acknowledged non-enslaved father; or by enslaving war captives, specifically kafir of Dar al-Harb, that is non-Muslims from non-Muslim lands, with whom Muslims of Dar al-Islam (the Muslim world) were by definition always in a state of war. From the point of view of both the Ottoman Empire and Persia, Georgia was therefore viewed as a legitimate slave supply source. The Georgian people, who were assumed to be Christian and therefore legitimate to enslave by Islamic law, were popular in the market of slavery in the Ottoman Empire, where they were described as beautiful and capable.

During the 18th century the Georgian kingdoms were tributary states of the Ottoman Empire, to whom it gave slave tributes, and subjected to slave raids by warfaring mountain tribes to such a degree that the population of Eastern Georgia had decreased to the numerous slave raids.

During the early modern age, Georgia could no longer grow and store crops or mine valuable minerals because of the constant sieges and warfare in the area, and the most valuable product of trade became the population of Georgia itself.

The merchants in the Georgian Black Sea port cities exported slaves in exchange for an import of wax, salt, rum, fur, timber and European luxury items. In the early modern period, the merchant class in Georgia were majority Armenian ethnicity.

One of the most active slave traders in Georgia were the mountain tribes, who made slave raids to the villages in Georgia and the walleys as well as capturing slaves during their warfare against other mountain tribes.

The diplomatic Ottoman-Georgian relations were dominated by slave tributes from the Georgians to the Ottomans. The Georgian monarchs had weak control over their kingdoms, where local noblemen ruled their own provinces and paid regular tributes of slaves from their serf population to the Ottoman Empire, as diplomatic gifts in exchange for Ottoman military protection. The convert Georgian–Ottoman official Ahmed Pasha of Akhaltsikhe (died 1758) participated in the Ottoman expansion of the Caucasus and determined the annual quote of slaves from Georgia. Ahmed Pasha of Akhaltsikhe was defeated by Solomon I in 1757. After his defeat of the Ottoman troops in Western Georgia at Khresili on 14 December 1757, king Solomon I formally banned the slave trade in 1759.

=== Decrease and abolition ===
In June 1768, King Solomon I appealed to Catherine II of Russia as the "universal mother of all Orthodox Christian countries" to aid him in defending his kingdom against the Ottoman Empire, liberate his citizens that had been enslaved by the Ottomans and provide his army with weapons. In September 1769. King Erekle II appealed to Catherine II of Russia for military intervention to help him liberate his citizens who had been enslaved in the Eastern Ottoman Empire. King Erekle II opposed the slave trade of the merchants as well as the nobility and also attempted to fight the slave raids in to Georgia. In the articles XXII and XXV of the 1774 Treaty of Kuchuk Kainardji between Russia and the Ottoman Empire, the Ottoman Empire was forced to promise to stop demanding tributes of slave children from Georgia, and to allow war captives and enslaved civilians to return to their home countries without being bought free by a ransom. In the 1783 Treaty of Georgievsk, Eastern Georgia was given protection from Russia instead of Iran, and the tributes of Georgian slave children were stopped. When the slave tributes from Georgia stopped, the Ottoman Empire retaliated by a punitive slave raid in to Georgia which took numerous captives for enslavement.

The Georgian rulers appeal to Russia to stop the slave tributes to the Ottoman Empire came to serve as an excuse for further Russian interference and eventually the Russian conquest of Georgia and Cacuasus. The Russian anti-slavery campaign in the Caucasus and Georgia was met with great sympathy in Europe (where abolitionism had now become popular), and attributed partially to the fact that many Russians had also fallen victims to the slave trade in the region.

After the Russian conquest of Georgia in 1801, the policy of the Russian Empire was to eradicate the slave trade in Georgia. The Russian anti slavery campaign was not only for humanitarian reasons but because the Russians wanted to put a stop to the export of human labor force from Georgia and the ongoing reduction of the Georgian population in the now Russian province. The Russian anti slavery campaign used diplomacy, military force, economic incentives such as redistribution of wealth and enforcement of Russian law to eradicate the Georgian slave trade. The policy dictated that slave traders and slave traffickers should be arrested and that the slaves in their possession should be repatriated to their homes: since many of the slaves trafficked were children who were unable to give information where they were from, they were put in orphanages. However, the slave trade was a deeply rooted practice in Georgia and the eradication of it took over fifty years. Many Russian officials did not enforce the Russian policy in their jurisdiction since they viewed it as a custom that would die out naturally, when the Russian economic policy gave economic incentives for it.

After the Crimean slave trade had been closed down by the Russian annexation of Crimea (1783), Georgians and Circassians continued to be exported to the Ottoman Empire via the Georgian and Circassian slave trade. In the context of the Circassian slave trade, the term Circassians did not necessarily refer to ethnic Circassians, but was used as an umbrella term for a number of different ethnicities from the Caucasus region, such as Georgians, Adyge, and Abkhazians, in the same fashion as the term "Abbyssinians" was used as a term also for African slaves who were not from Abyssinia. In the Treaty of Adrianople, the Russians were given control over the Ottoman forts along the Black Sea coast between Anatolia and the Caucasus, significantly reducing the Circassian slave trade, which caused the price of white women on the markets of Constantinople and Cairo to skyrocket. In the 1840s, the Ottoman Empire agreed to stop their attacks on Russian forts along the Black Sea in exchange for the Russians turning a blind eye to the Circassian slave trade in now Russian Caucasus, which the Russians agreed to silently tolerate. In 1854, foreign diplomatic pressure forced the Ottoman Empire to introduce the Prohibition of the Circassian and Georgian Slave Trade.

By the 1850s, economic as well as cultural changes had caused the slave trade to die out in Georgia except in the mountain areas. By the 1850s, the slave trade of the Georgian nobility (and merchants) had finally been eradicated by the Russians, but the slave raids of the mountain tribes continued, and the Russians turned their anti slavery campaign against them. The customary slave trade of the mountain tribes and Circassia were not stopped until after the Circassian genocide of the 1860s. By 1864, slave trade from Georgia is recorded to have been finally abolished.

== Slavery and serfdom in Georgia ==
In his description of Iberia, Strabo described laoi as peasant laborers who were subservient to their overlords to whom they paid cash in kind as well as with labor, but the laoi are believed to have been serfs rather than actual chattel slaves, while the actual slaves would have been foreigners.

In the batonqmoba system of Georgian feudalism, the qma were defined as slaves of the landlords, that could be bought and sold. After the 15th century, the Georgian feudal system disintegrated in to the decline vassal relations, which resulted in decline of royal authority of the nobility and the de facto establishment of a system known as tavadoba, the rule of the princes, in which the nobility essentially became independent in their provinces and only nominally subject to their king.

The separation of slavery and serfdom was sometimes unclear, but was not the same. In Abkhazeti for example serfs were called akh-uiu and chattel slaves were referred to as akhashala. Until the early 19th century, the Georgian nobility would give serfs as presents to each other as a part of etiquette, for example as a thank you gift for a rifle or a horse.

=== Abolition ===
After the Russian conquest in 1801, serfdom in Georgia was adjusted to be in line with serfdom in Russia. In 1847, the Russians extended the Russian Law of June 16 1833 in Transcaucasia, which prohibited the sale or gift of serfs without also gifting or selling the land they were attached to, a reform that in essentially prevented the serfs from being sold and bought as chattel slaves.

Russia abolished serfdom in Georgia gradually, on different dates in different provinces. Serfdom in the Province of Tiflis was abolished 13 October 1864, serfdom in Samegrelo was abolished in 1867, in Abkhazeti in 1870 and finally in Svaneti in 1871.

== See also ==
- Nobility of Georgia (country)
- Circassian slave trade
- Prohibition of the Circassian and Georgian Slave Trade
