= List of historical states of Georgia =

This is an incomplete list of states that have existed on the present-day territory of Georgia since ancient times. It includes de facto independent entities like the major medieval duchies (saeristavo).

== Antiquity ==
- Kingdom of Diauehi (12th–8th centuries BC)
- Kingdom of Colchis (550–164 BC)
- Kingdom of Iberia (302 BC – 580 AD)
- Aryan Kartli (until 302 BC)
- Kingdom of Machelones (1st - 4th century AD)
- Kingdom of Lazica (2nd – 7th century AD)

== Early Middle Ages ==
- Principate of Iberia (580–888)
- Emirate of Tbilisi (736–1122)
- Kingdom of Abkhazia (778–1008)
- Kingdom of Hereti (787–1014)
- Principality of Kakheti (787–1014)
- Kingdom of the Iberians (888–1008)
- Unified Kingdom of Kakheti and Hereti (1014–1104)

== Unification and fragmentation (11th–18th centuries) ==
=== Kingdoms ===
- Kingdom of Georgia (978–1466)
- Kingdom of Kartli (1484–1762)
- Kingdom of Kakheti (1455–1762)
- Kingdom of Kartli and Kakheti (1762–1801)
- Kingdom of Imereti (1455–1810)

=== Principalities ===
- Principality of Samtskhe (1268–1628)
- Principality of Guria (1460s–1829)
- Principality of Svaneti (1460s–1857)
- Principality of Mingrelia (1557–1857)
- Principality of Abkhazia (1660–1866)

=== Duchies ===
- Duchy of Kldekari (876–1103)
- Duchy of Racha (1050–1789)
- Duchy of Aragvi (1380–1747)
- Duchy of Ksani (15th century – 1801)

== Modern history ==
- Republic of Guria (1905–1906)
- Democratic Republic of Georgia (1918–1921)
- Georgian Soviet Socialist Republic (1921–1991)
- Republic of Georgia (1991–present)
