= Elena Machabeli =

- Born: 2 February 1906; Tiflis, Georgia Governorate, Russian Empire
- Died: 1987 (aged 80–81)
- Known for: Sculpture
- Memorials: Mtskheta

Elena Machabeli (Georgian: ელენე მაჩაბელი; 2 February 1906 – 1987) was a Georgian sculptor and aristocrat from the Machabeli family. A heroic monument to her design was erected in Mtskheta, Georgia, in 1949. In 1960, she was awarded the title Honored Artist of Georgia.
