= Samtavro necropolis =

Cemetery in Georgia

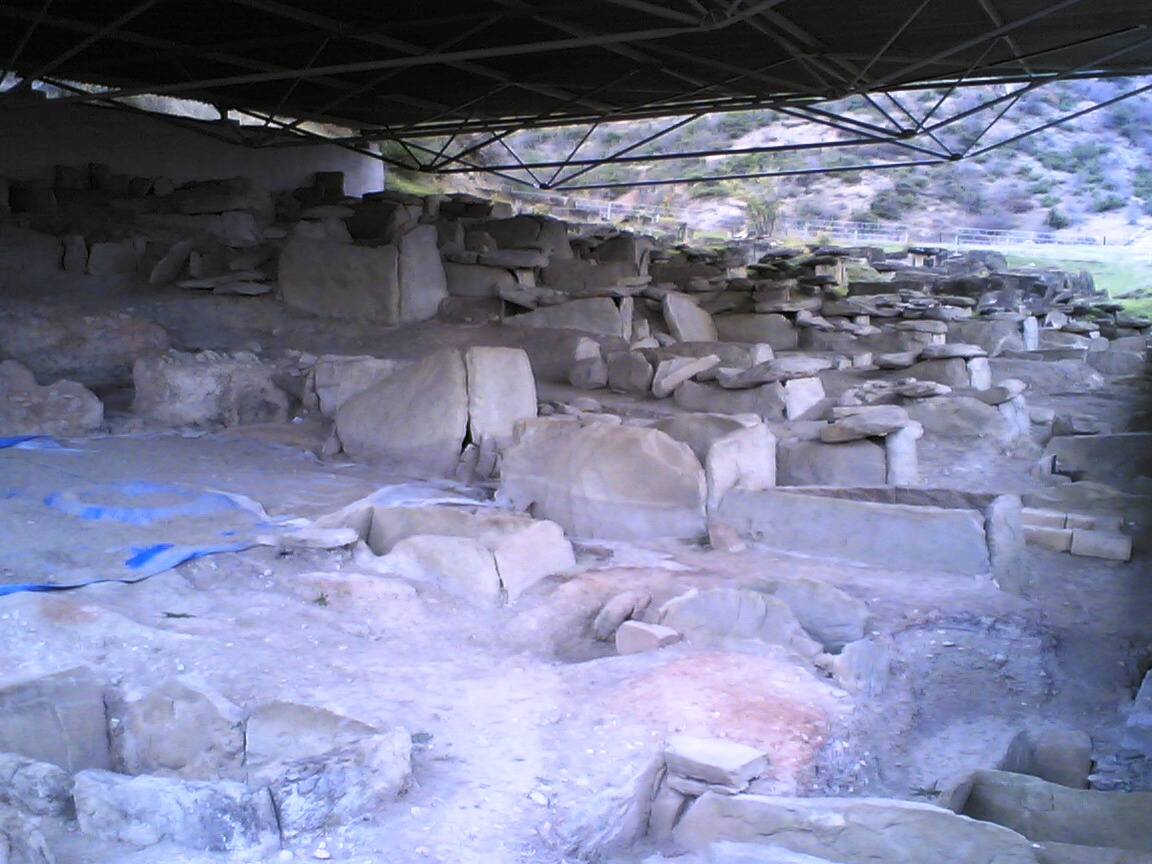

The Burial ground of the principality (Georgian: სამთავროს სამაროვანი, romanized: samtavros samarovani) also known as Samtavro necropolis, is a cemetery north of Mtskheta, Georgia, dated between the middle of the third millennium BC and the 10th century. It was first excavated by F. Bayern in the 1870s and 1880. Excavations began again in 1938 by A. Kalandadze and still continue.

== History ==
Archaeologists have examined up to 3,000 graves of various types and determined the stratigraphy of the place. Archaic pottery, stone tools and, burned structures were discovered in the oldest cultural layer (Early Bronze Age). A burial mound of the Middle Bronze Age contained bronze tools, gold jewelry and, pearls among others. Particularly diverse archaeological material was found at the burials of the Late Bronze Age and the Early Iron Age. Among the artefacts found were polished ceramics with geometric patterns and enameled ceramics, bronze and iron tools, engraved bronze belts, bones, zoomorphic bronze figures, as well as agates and other jewels.

The upper layer of the cemetery dates from the second century - I to C. It contained stone tombs, cistas, stone sarcophagi, ashlars crypts, and slab or brick tombs.

== Literature ==
- A. Kalandadze: Pre-ancient archaeological sites of Samtavro, Mtskheta IV, Tbilisi, 1980.
- T. Chubinishvili: The oldest archeological sites in Mtskheta, Tbilisi, 1957.
- M. Ivashchenko: Burial in Samtavro of the first three centuries, Mtskheta III, Tbilisi, 1980.
