= Pavle Ingorokva =

Georgian historian (1893–1983)

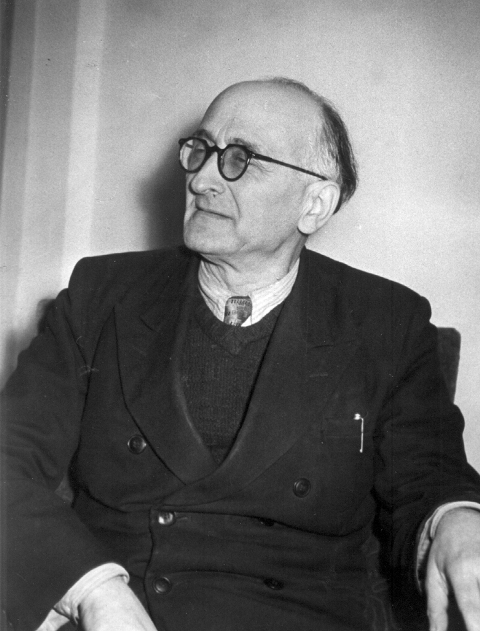
Pavle Ingorokva

Pavle Ingorokva (Georgian: პავლე ინგოროყვა; January 1, 1893 in Poti – November 20, 1983 in Tbilisi) was a Georgian historian, philologist, and public benefactor.

He graduated from the University of St. Petersburg (1916). In 1917 he was one of the founders of the Union of Georgian Writers. In 1917–1919 he was a member of the "National Council of Georgia". On May 26, 1918 Ingorokva signed the "Act of Independence of Georgia". In 1921 he protested the occupation of Georgia by the Bolshevist Russia, in 1921–1923 Ingorokva was a member of the group "Shavchokhianebi" ("Blackchokhians"). In 1924–1925, he was the editor-in-chief of the Georgian scientific and literary Journal Kavkasioni ("The Caucasus"). The Journal was closed by the Bolshevik regime.

In 1925 Ingorokva founded the Publishing House "Kartuli Tsigni" ("The Georgian Book"). This Publishing House published works of Ilia Chavchavadze in the XI volumes (1926–1928) and works of other outstanding Georgian authors. In 1933 "Kartuli Tsigni" was closed.

In 1929–1940 Ingorokva was a Head of the Department of Manuscripts of the State Museum of Georgia (now the Georgian National Museum), in 1940–1950 a senior research fellow of the Institute of History (Tbilisi). In 1958 he was one of the founders of the Institute of Manuscripts (now the Georgian National Center of Manuscripts). He was also a member of the Commission on Study of The Knight in the Panther's Skin of the Georgian Academy of Sciences (GAS) (now Georgian National Academy of Sciences).

Pavle Ingorokva's main fields of the scientific activity were the history of the Georgian literature, history of Georgia, source studies of the history of Georgia, Rustavelology (Study of the works of the mediaeval Georgian writer Shota Rustaveli), history of Georgian script, etc. Some of his findings have proved extremely contentious.

== Some main works of Pavle Ingorokva ==
- Rustveliana (a monograph about Shota Rustaveli), Tbilisi, 1926, 200 pp. (in Georgian).
- The Georgian inscriptions of Antique – Bulletin of the Institute of Language, History and Material Culture (ENIMK), vol. X, Tbilisi, 1941, pp. 411–427 (in Georgian).
- The old Georgian chronicle "Moktsevai Kartlisai" and the List of the Kings of Iberia (a monograph) – Bulletin of the State Museum of Georgia, vol. XI-B, Tbilisi, 1942, pp. 259–320 (in Georgian).
- Giorgi Merchule: kartveli mcerali meate sauvunisa: narkvevi zveli Sakartvelos literaturis, kulturis da saxelmcip oebrivi cxovrebis istoriidan, (Tbilisi; "Sabcota mcerali”, 1954) [Giorgi Merchule – Georgian writer of the 10th century (a monograph)], Tbilisi, 1954, 1,000 pp. (in Georgian).
- Ilia Chavchavadze (a monograph), Tbilisi, 1951, 200 pp. (in Georgian).

== See also ==
- List of Georgians
