= Mtskhetos =

Georgian mythological figure

Mtskhetos (Georgian: მცხეთოსი), is an epic hero in Georgian mythology, the son of Kartlos, eponymous ancestor of the Georgians, founder of Mtskheta, the capital of the Georgian Kingdom of Iberia.

According to The Georgian Chronicles, Mtskhetos was the strongest warrior among the brothers, all of whom obeyed to him. He was the only son of Kartlos, who stayed to live on the land of his father. At the confluence of rivers Mtkvari and Aragvi Mtskhetos founded the city, which he called after himself, Mtskheta. He conquered the lands to the west till the Black Sea.

Mtskhetos had three sons: Uplos, Odzrkhos and Javakhos. Between them Mtskhetos divided the country. After the death of Mtskhetos, his brothers became hostile to each other.
