= Aryan Kartli =

Possible homeland of the Georgians of Kartli

Aryan Kartli or Arian Kartli (meaning "Iranian Kartli" (Note: cf. Name of Iran); Georgian: არიან-ქართლი) was a country claimed by the medieval Georgian chronicle "The Conversion of Kartli" (მოქცევაჲ ქართლისაჲ, mokc'evay k'art'lisay) to be the earlier homeland of the Georgians of Kartli.

== Overview ==
The Georgian Chronicles relate the apocryphal story of Alexander the Great's campaign into inner Georgia. Alexander reportedly brought Azoy (Azo), the son of the unnamed "king of Aryan-Kartli", together with followers, to Mtskheta, principal city of Kartli, and charged him with the administration of Kartli in his absence. The 11th-century Georgian monk Arsen, the author of metaphrastical reduction of "The life of St. Nino" and tutor of King David IV of Georgia, comments on this passage: "We, Georgians, are descendants of the newcomers from Aryan-Kartli, we speak their language and all the kings of Kartli are descendants of their kings".

Classical sources scholars have inferred that this land lay within the orbit of the Achaemenid Persian Empire. Herodotus' list of the Achaemenid provinces, which places the proto-Georgian tribes within the 13th and 19th satrapies, is significant in this regard. These territories partially correspond to the historical Georgian southwest where a number of Georgian scholars, notably Giorgi Melikishvili, tend to place Aryan Kartli.

According to the modern historian Stephen H. Rapp, risen in the last phase of the Achaemenid Empire, Aryan Kartli was the first known autonomous kingdom in eastern Georgia. Even though prior to Aryan Kartli there had been small political entities in the western area's of Georgia, closer to the Black Sea (such as Egrisi/Colchis), it would be the polities to the east of the Surami Pass that "came to embody Georgian political life".

Little is known about Aryan Kartli, however, according to Rapp, it appears to have been an "Achaemenid client on the northern fringe of Iranian domains". Rapp notes that Aryan Kartli "may well be associated with a remarkable palace built according to Achaemenid styles and techniques" at Gumbat'i in Kakheti in eastern Georgia. However, other locations have been proposed as well for Aryan Kartli, including to the southwest of Kartli, in the Armeno-Kartvelian marchlands.

The early Georgian kingdom of Kartli/Iberia, which clearly emerges in historical accounts of Hellenistic period, seems to have shared the Iranian bonds of Aryan Kartli. Cyril Toumanoff equates the region with the Aranē (Greek: 'Αράνη) of Ptolemy (V.6.18) and the Harrana of the Hittites.

== Sources ==
- Rapp, Stephen H. (2003), Studies In Medieval Georgian Historiography: Early Texts And Eurasian Contexts. Peeters Bvba ISBN 90-429-1318-5.
- Rapp, Stephen H. (2017). "Georgia before the Mongols". Oxford Research Encyclopedia of Asian History. doi:10.1093/acrefore/9780190277727.013.282. ISBN 9780190277727.
- Kavtaradze, Giorgi L. Georgian Chronicles and the raison d'étre of the Iberian Kingdom (Caucasica II). (Archived 2009-10-25) Orbis Terrarum, Journal of Historical Geography of the Ancient World 6, 2000. Stuttgart: Franz Steiner Verlag, 2001, pp. 177–237.
