= Mamasakhlisi =

Mamasakhlisi is also a Georgian surname

Mamasakhlisi (Georgian: მამასახლისი) was a title of the Georgian rulers.

Mamasakhlisi literally means "Father of the House", მამა (mama) meaning "father" and სახლი (sakhli) meaning "house".

== See also ==
- Eristavi
- Batoni
- Aznauri
- Mtavari
