= Giorgi Melikishvili =

Georgian historian (1918–2002)

- გიორგი მელიქიშვილი Гео́ргий Меликишви́ли
- Born: December 30, 1918; Tiflis, Democratic Republic of Georgia
- Died: April 19, 2002 (aged 83); Tbilisi, Georgia
- Education: Doctor of Historical Sciences, Tbilisi State University, (1939)
- Occupation: Historian
- Employer: Tbilisi State University
- Awards: Lenin Prize, Order of the Badge of Honour, Order of the October Revolution, Order of the Red Banner of Labour

Giorgi Aleksandres dze Melikishvili (Georgian: გიორგი ალექსანდრეს ძე მელიქიშვილი; Russian: Гео́ргий Алекса́ндрович Меликишви́ли; 30 December 1918 – 19 April 2002) was a Georgian historian known for his fundamental works on the history of Georgia, Caucasia and the Middle East. He earned international recognition for his research on Urartu.

== Biography ==
Giorgi Melikishvili was born in Tbilisi on 30 December 1918. He graduated from the Faculty of History of Tbilisi State University in 1939. In 1944, he began working at the Department of Georgian History of the Institute of History, Archaeology and Ethnography of the Academy of Sciences of Georgia. In 1954 he defended his doctoral dissertation, titled Drevnevostochnye materialy po istorii narodov Zakavkazya (Materials from the Ancient East on the history of the peoples of the Transcaucasus). From 1954 to 1988, he chaired the Department of Ancient History of the institute and from 1965 to 1999 served as the institute's director. He remained its honorary director until his death in 2002. In 1957 he became the first Soviet historian to receive the Lenin Prize. In 1960 he became a member of the Georgian SSR Academy of Sciences.

Melikishvili made important contributions to the studies of the Iron Age kingdom of Urartu. In 1953 and 1954, he published the books Nairi-Urartu and Urartskie klinoobraznye nadpisi (Urartian cuneiform inscriptions), both in Russian. Through his study of Urartian cuneiform inscriptions, he addressed questions of the historical geography and population groups of the ancient Near East. He focused on the social and economic features of Nairi-Urartu and studied the culture and religious beliefs of its peoples. In Urartskie klinoobraznye nadpisi, he collected all Urartian inscriptions known at the time, with transliterations, translations, and commentary on the texts. He also included in the book an overview of Urartian grammar and a dictionary of Urartian words.

Melikishvili studied relations between ancient Georgia, Anatolia and Mesopotamia. Using Assyrian and Urartian sources, he wrote many works about the history of the Hurrians, the Hittites, the Assyrians, the Zagros Mountains region and other countries of the Near East. He studied the ancient Georgian region of Colchis and the tribal union of Diauehi. His Russian-language work K istorii drevney Gruzii (Towards the history of ancient Georgia, 1959) to this day remains a standard reference for the ancient history of Georgia. Some of Melikishvili's most influential essays were published in 1999 in the collection Dziebani sakartvelos, k'avk'asiisa da akhlo aghmosavletis dzveli ist'oriis dargshi (Researches in the ancient history of Georgia, Caucasia and the Near East). (Note: Georgian text: ძიებანი საქართველოს, კავკასიისა და ახლო აღმოსავლეთის ძველი ისტორიის დარგში)

== Selected works ==
- (1954) Drevnevostochnye materialy po istorii narodov Zakavkazya (Древневосточные материалы по истории народов Закавказья (Materials from the Ancient East on the history of the peoples of the Transcaucasus)), Tbilisi: Izdatelstvo Akademii Nauk Gruzinskoy SSR.
- (1954) Nairi-Urartu (Наири–Урарту), Tbilisi: Izdatelstvo Akademii Nauk Gruzinskoy SSR.
- (1959) K istorii drevney Gruzii (К истории древней Грузии (Towards the history of ancient Georgia))
- (1962) "K izicheniyu drevney vostochnomaloaziiskoy etnonimiki" (К изучению древней восточномалоазийской этнонимики (On the study of ancient eastern Anatolian ethnonymy)), Journal of Ancient History, No. 1.
- (1962) "Kulkha: Iz drevney istorii Yuzhnogo Zakavkazya" (Кулха: Из древней истории Южного Закавказья (Colchis: From the ancient history of the South Transcaucasus)). In the collection Drevny mir (Древний мир), Moscow: Vostochnaya Literatura.
- (1964) Urartsky yazyk (Урартский язык (The Urartian language)), Мoscow: Nauka.
- (1965) Sakartvelos, k'avk'asiisa da makhlobeli aghmosavletis udzvelesi mosakhleobis sak'itkhisatvis (საქართველოს, კავკასიისა და მახლობელი აღმოსავლეთის უძველესი მოსახლეობის საკითხისათვის (On the question of the ancient population of Georgia, the Caucasus, and the Near East)), Tbilisi: Metsniereba.
