= Kartli =

Coordinates: 41°16′00″N 44°30′10″E

Kartli ქართლი
- Historical region
- Map highlighting the historical region of Kartli in modern borders of Georgia
- Country: Georgia
- Mkhare: Shida Kartli; Kvemo Kartli; Samtskhe-Javakheti
- Capital: Tbilisi

Area
  - Total: 21,333 km^{2} (8,237 sq mi)

Kartli (Georgian: ქართლი, pronounced [ˈkʰaɾtʰli]) is a historical region in central-to-eastern Georgia traversed by the river Mtkvari (Kura), on which Georgia's capital, Tbilisi, is situated. Known to the classical authors as Hiberia, Kartli played a crucial role in the ethnic and political consolidation of the Georgians in the Middle Ages. Kartli had no strictly defined boundaries and they significantly fluctuated in the course of history. After the partition of the kingdom of Georgia in the 15th century, Kartli became a separate kingdom with its capital at Tbilisi. The historical lands of Kartli are currently divided among several administrative regions of Georgia.

The Georgians living in the historical lands of Kartli are known as Kartlians (Georgian: ქართლელები, romanized: kartlelebi) and comprise one of the largest geographic subgroups of the Georgian people. Most of them are Eastern Orthodox Christians adhering to the national Georgian Orthodox Church and speak a dialect which is the basis of the modern Georgian literary language.

== Etymology ==
The toponym "Kartli" first emerges in written accounts in the 5th-century Martyrdom of the Holy Queen Shushanik, the earliest surviving piece of Georgian literature. According to the medieval Georgian Chronicles, Kartli derives its name from Kartlos, the mythic Georgian ethnarch, who built a city on the Mtkvari; it was called Kartli (probably at the latter-day Armazi), a name which generalized to the country ruled by Kartlos and his progeny. Kartlos seems to be a medieval contrivance and his being the eponymous founder of Kartli is not convincing. The medieval chronicler characteristically renders this name with the Greek nominative suffix –ος (os), as Stephen H. Rapp of Georgia State University (Atlanta) assumes, "in order to impart the account with a sense of antiquity".

The term itself ultimately derives from Proto-Kartvelian root *kart- ("Georgian"), which is considered an ancient inner-Kartvelian formation by modern linguists. See ქართლი and ქართველი for more.

However, professor Giorgi Melikishvili has linked the toponym Kartli with a word karta (ქართა), found in Mingrelian (a Kartvelian language related to Georgian) and in some western Georgian dialects and meaning "a cattle pen" or "an enclosed place". The root kar occurs in numerous placenames across Georgia and, in the opinion of Melikishvili, displays semantic similarity with the Indo-European prototype; cf. Germanic gardaz ("enclosure", "garden"), Lithuanian gardas ("enclosure", "hurdle", "cattle pen"), Old Slavic gradu ("garden", also "city"), and Hittite gurtas ("fortress"). Relationships have also been sought with the Khaldi and Carduchi of the Classical sources.

== Early history ==
The formation of Kartli and its people, the Kartveli (ქართველი) is poorly documented. The infiltration of several ancient, chiefly Anatolian, tribes into the territory of modern-day Georgia and their fusion with the autochthons played a decisive role in this process. This might have been reflected in the story of Arian-Kartli, the semi-legendary place of the aboriginal Georgian habitat found in the early medieval chronicle Conversion of Kartli.

During the 3rd century BC, Kartli and its original capital Mtskheta (succeeded by Tbilisi during the 5th century) formed a nucleus around which the ancient Georgian kingdom known to the Greco-Romans as Hiberia evolved. The role of Kartli as a core ethnic and political unit which would form a basis for the subsequent Georgian unification further increased as a result of its Christianization early in the 4th century. Located in an area influenced by both the Byzantine and Iranian civilizations, Kartli developed a Christian culture, aided by the fact that it was the only Kartvelian area with its own written language. With the consolidation of Arab rule in Tbilisi during the 8th century, the political capital of Kartli shifted to its southwest, but the Georgian literati of that time afforded to Kartli a broader meaning to denote all those lands of medieval Georgia that were alike by religion, culture, and language. In one of the most-quoted passages of medieval Georgian literature, the 9th-century writer Giorgi Merchule asserts: "And Kartli consists of that spacious land in which the liturgy and all prayers are said in the Georgian language. But [only] the Kyrie eleison is said in Greek, [the phrase] which means in Georgian "Lord, have mercy" or "Lord, be merciful to us".

After the unification of various Georgian polities into the kingdom of Georgia early during the 11th century, the names "Kartli" and "Kartveli" became a basis of the Georgian self-designation Sakartvelo. The Georgian circumfix sa-X-o is a standard geographic construction designating "the area where X dwell", where X is an ethnonym.

== Medieval subdivision ==
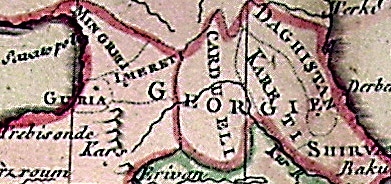
Kartli, spelled in French as "Cardueli", shown on a detail from the 1767 map by Jean Clouet

During the Middle Ages, Kartli was traditionally divided, approximately along the river Mtkvari, into the three principal regions:

- Shida Kartli (შიდა ქართლი), i.e., Inner Kartli, centered on Mtskheta and Uplistsikhe comprising all of central Kartli north and south of the Mtkvari and west of its tributary, the Aragvi;
- Kvemo Kartli (ქვემო ქართლი), i.e., Lower Kartli, comprising the lands in the lower basin of the Mtkvari and south of that river;
- Zemo Kartli (ზემო ქართლი), i.e., Upper Kartli, comprising the lands in the upper basin of the Mtkvari and south of that river, west of Kvemo Kartli.

Most of these lands are now part of Georgia's regions of Shida Kartli (of which Gori is the capital) and Kvemo Kartli (with its capital at Rustavi), but also of Samtskhe-Javakheti (of which Akhaltsikhe its capital), and Mtskheta-Mtianeti (Mtskheta is the capital). A significant portion of Zemo Kartli is now part of Turkey.

== Later history ==
With the fragmentation of the kingdom of Georgia during the 15th century, the kings of Georgia were left with Kartli alone, having Tbilisi as their capital. The kings of Kartli did not relinquish the titles of the all-Georgian monarchs whose legitimate successors they claimed to be. The Europeans, thus, knew it as "Georgia proper" and later also as Kartalinia via the Russian Карталиния [kartalinʲɪjə]. Similarly, the toponym Gorjestān (Georgia) was usually used in Persian in the narrower sense of Kartli.

The kingdom of Kartli was a battleground of the Ottoman-Safavid wars, conflicts among neighboring Georgian and Caucasian rulers, and of its own civil wars into the 18th century. Beginning from 1550, and more strictly since 1614, the Georgian rulers pursued the "politics of compromise" with their Persian overlords. This implied that Persia allowed Kartli or any other region ruled by them to retain a considerable autonomy and the Georgian dynasty of Bagratids to possess the royal throne provided they adopted Islam and remained subordinate to the shah. In Georgian documents, the Georgian rulers continued to be styled as kings, while Persian official documents referred to them as the wāli ("viceroy") of Gorjestān, emphasizing their subservience to the shah. Many members of the aristocratic elite of Kartli had important positions in the Persian military and administration and several noble women entered the shah's harems. This situation changed in 1745, when, with the permission of Nāder Shah, Teimuraz II was crowned as king of Kartli according to Christian customs. In 1748, Kartli became essentially independent, with only formal side of Persian vassalage still observed. In 1762, Kartli was united with the neighboring eastern Georgian kingdom of Kakheti into a single state, which became a Russian protectorate in 1783, but it suffered a devastating Persian invasion in 1795, when Agha Mohammad Khan of Persia's newly established Qajar dynasty sought to bring Georgia again under Persian hegemony. The weakened kingdom was annexed by the Russian Empire in 1801 and this new rearrangement was confirmed by the Treaty of Gulistan in 1813 following the Russo-Persian War (1804-1813).
