= Mtskheta =

City in Mtskheta-Mtianeti, Georgia

Mtskheta მცხეთა
- Town
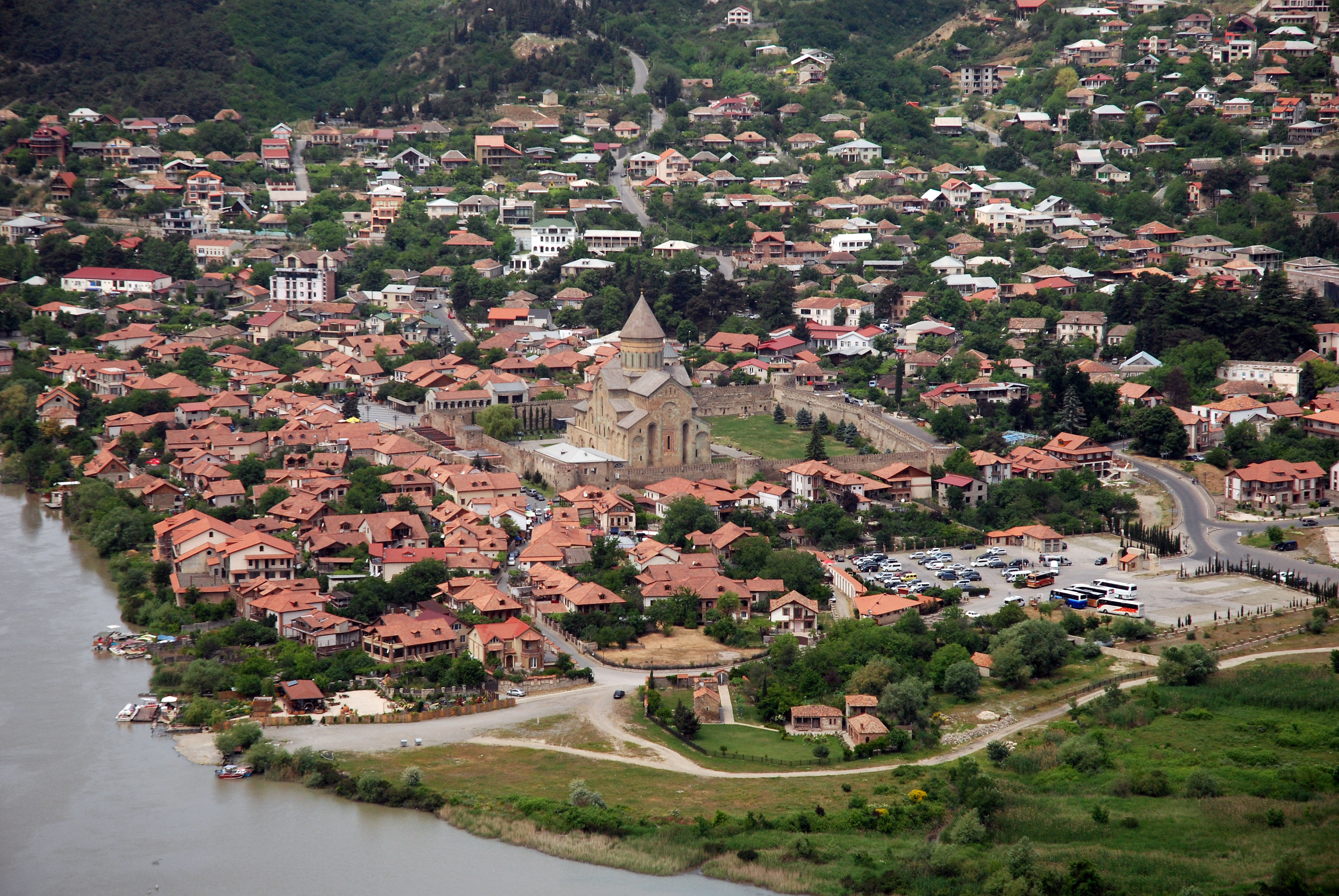
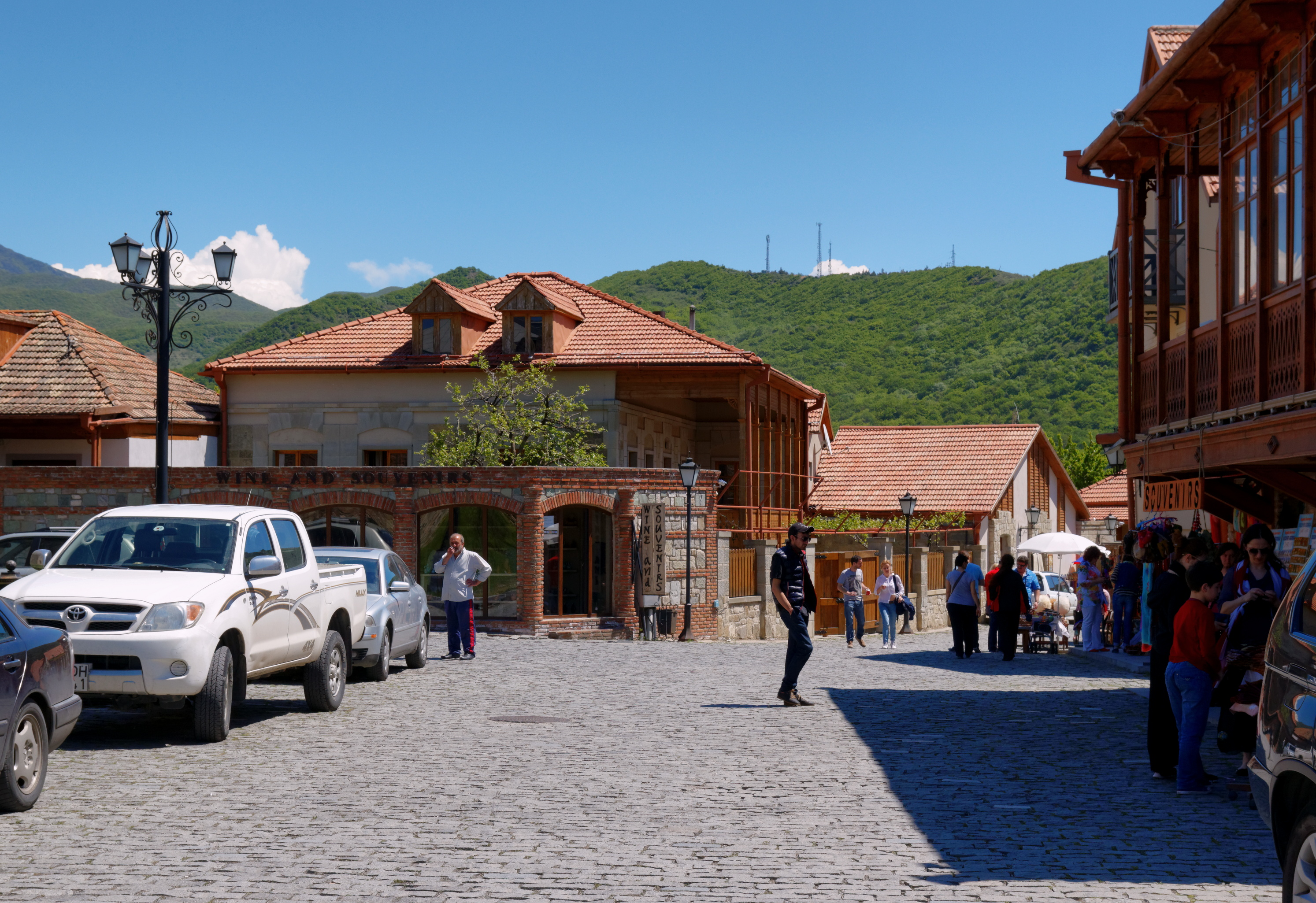
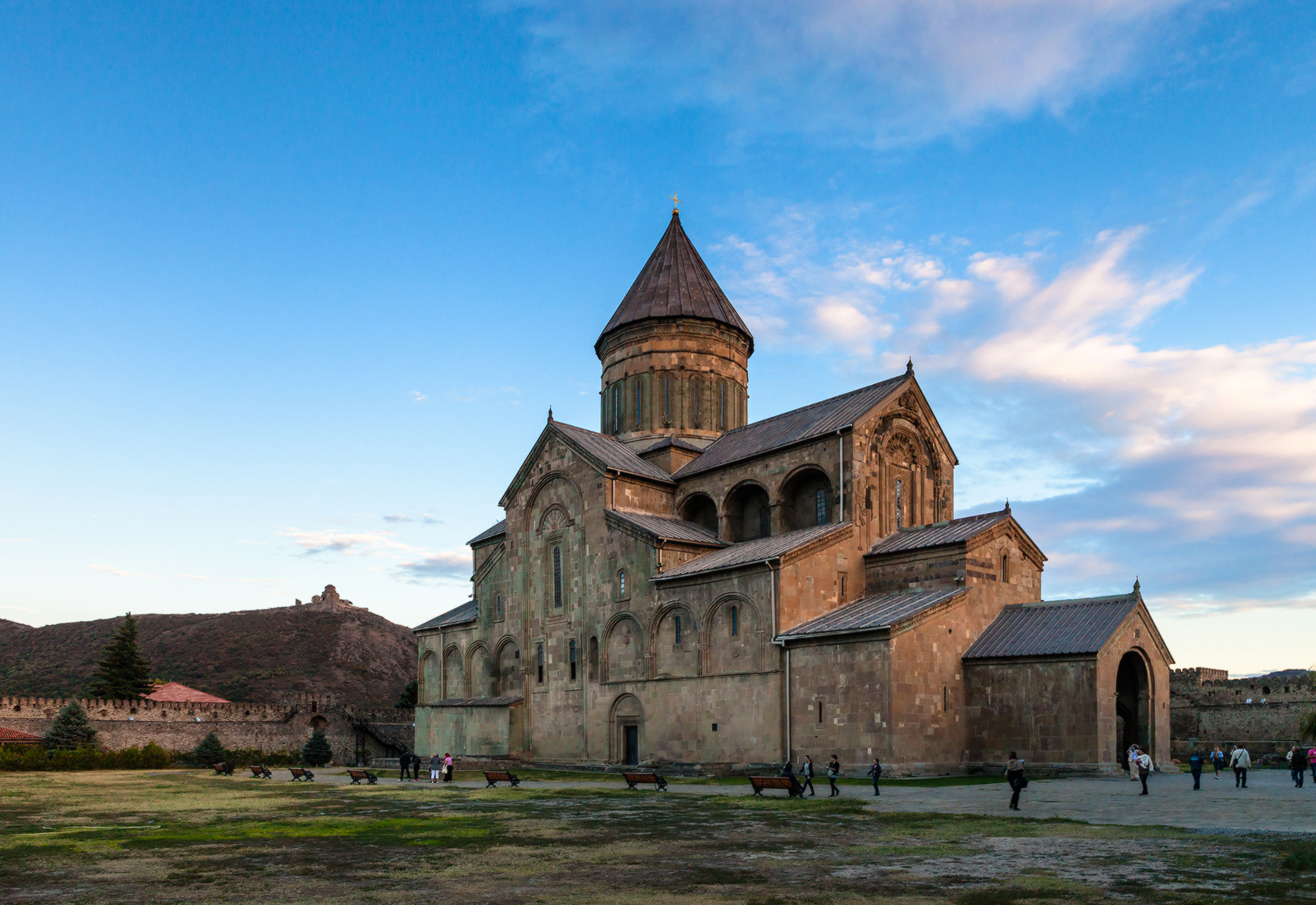

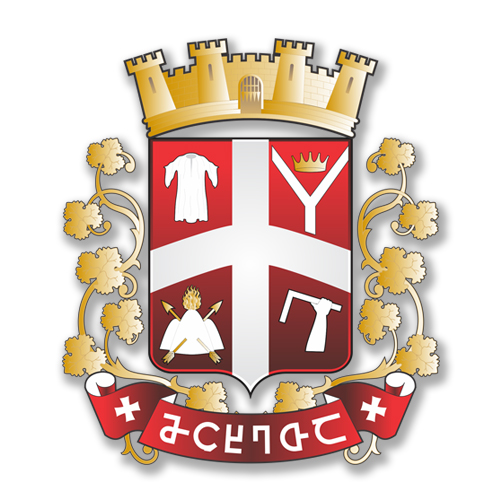
- Flag Seal
- Interactive map of Mtskheta
- Location of Mtskheta within Georgia Mtskheta (Mtskheta-Mtianeti)
- Coordinates: 41°50′47″N 44°43′10″E
- Country: Georgia
- Mkhare: Mtskheta-Mtianeti
- Municipality: Mtskheta
- Established: 5th century BC
- Elevation: 460 m (1,510 ft)

Population (2024)
  - Total: 7,392
- Time zone: UTC+4 (Georgian time)
- Postal code: 3300
- Climate: Cfa
- Website: www.mtskheta-mtianeti.gov.ge

Mtskheta (Georgian: მცხეთა [mt͡sʰχetʰa]) is a city in the region of Mtskheta-Mtianeti, Georgia. It is one of the oldest continuously inhabited cities in the world. It is located approximately 20 km (12 mi) north of Tbilisi, at the confluence of the Kura and Aragvi rivers. Currently a small provincial capital, for nearly a millennium until the 5th century AD, Mtskheta was a large fortified city and a significant economic and political center of the Kingdom of Iberia.

Due to the historical significance of the town and its several outstanding churches and cultural monuments, the "Historical Monuments of Mtskheta" became a UNESCO World Heritage Site in 1994. As the birthplace and one of the most vibrant centers of Christianity in Georgia, Mtskheta was declared the "Holy City" by the Georgian Orthodox Church in 2014.

In 2016, the Historical Monuments of Mtskheta were placed by UNESCO under Enhanced Protection, a mechanism established by the 1999 Second Protocol to the 1954 Hague Convention for the Protection of Cultural Property in the Event of Armed Conflict.

== Geography ==
Mtskheta is set on a lowland, surrounded by mountains, at the confluence of the two rivers, Kura and Aragvi. The city is approached from the north by the Greater Caucasus and from the south by the Lesser Caucasus mountains.

== History ==
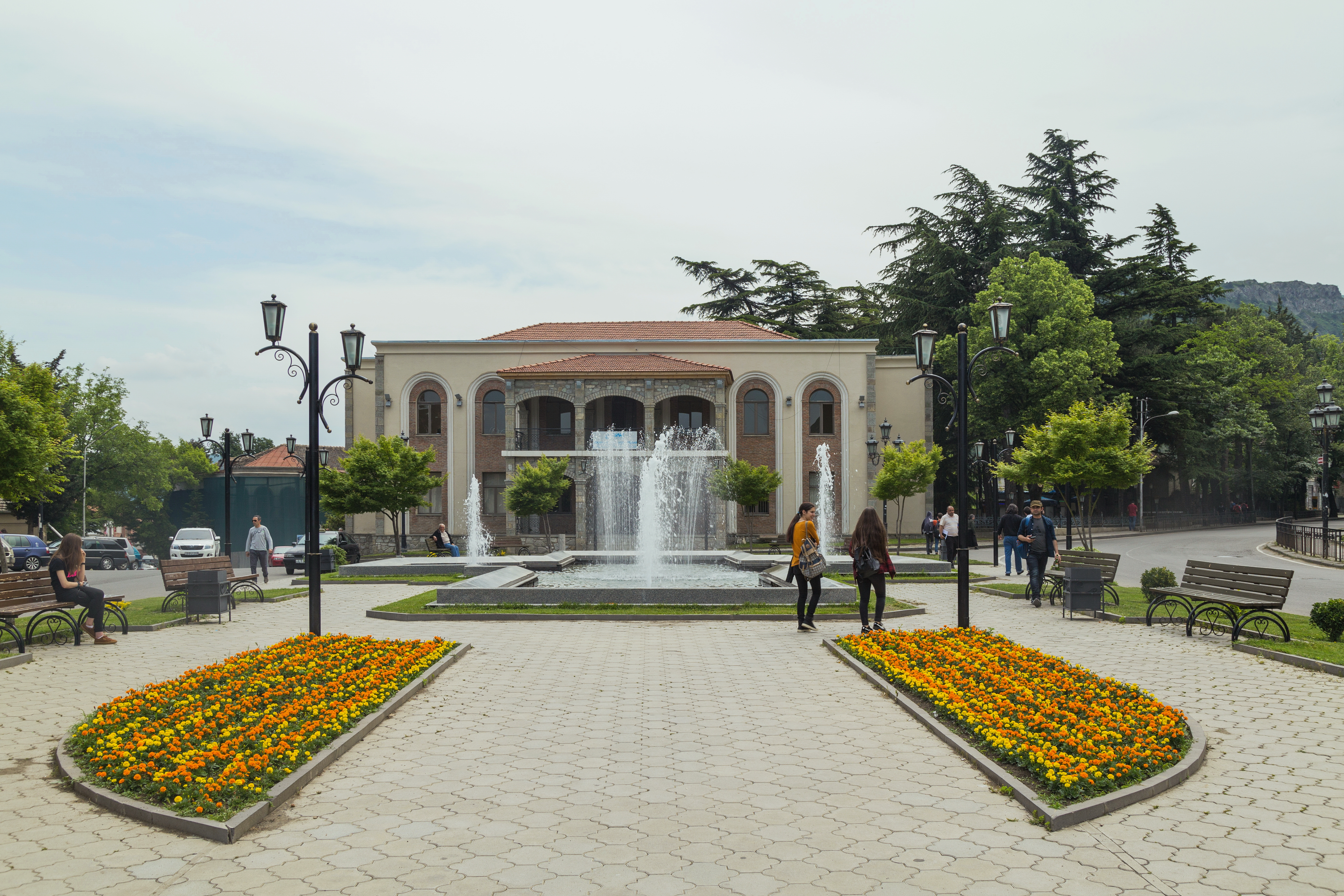
Town square

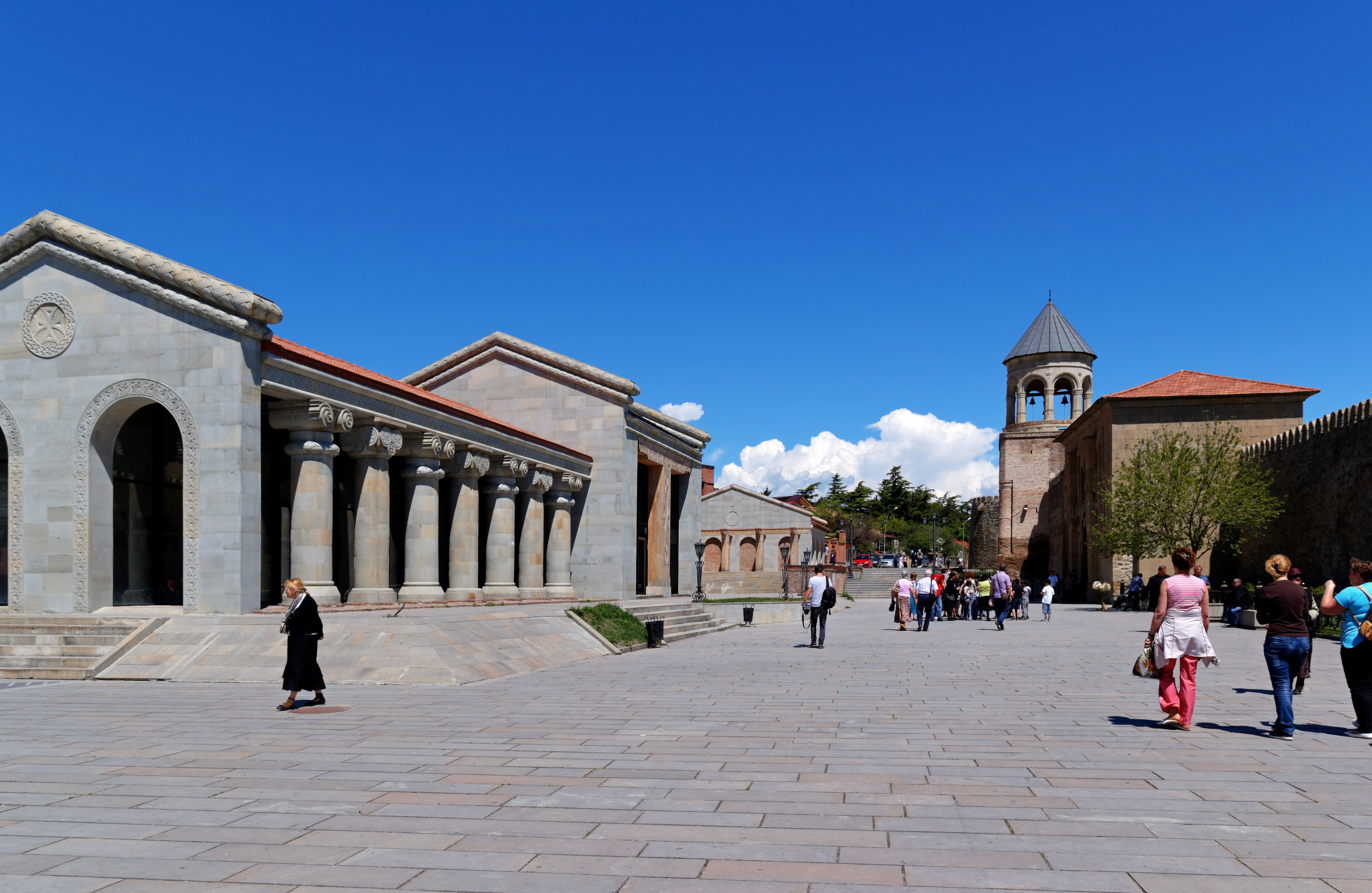
Street near Svetitskhoveli Cathedral

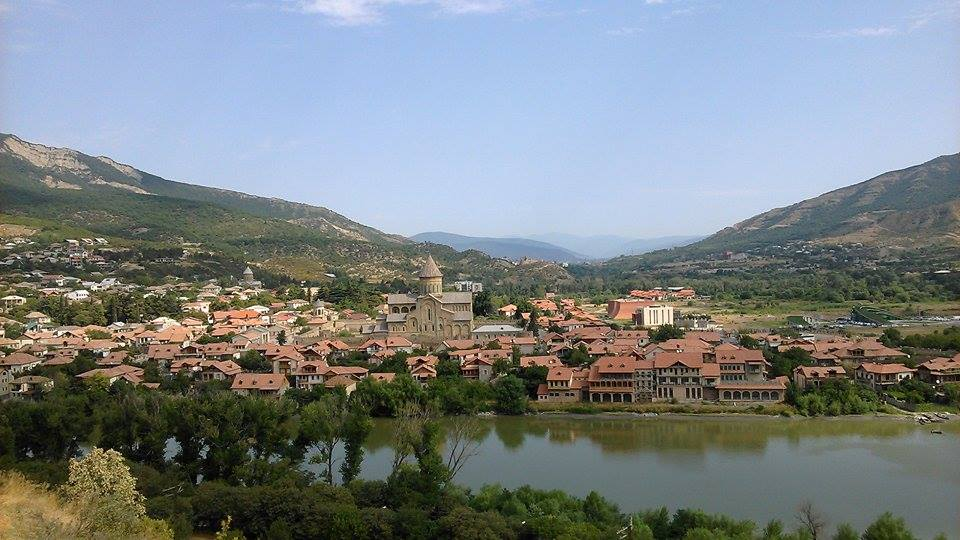

=== Foundation ===
Archeological evidences trace human settlement in the area of Mtskheta from 2nd millennium BC to early 1st millennium AD. Numerous burials of the Bronze Age (beginning of the 1st millennium BC) prove that Mtskheta already was a significant settlement at that period.

According to The Georgian Chronicles, Mtskheta was founded by Mtskhetos, the son of Kartlos, eponymous ancestor of the Georgians. The wall around the city was built by Nimrod's ancestor Ardam. By another version, more accepted by historians, Mtskheta was founded by the ancient Meschian tribes in the 5th century BC.

=== Capital of the Kingdom of Iberia ===
Mtskheta was the capital of the early Georgian Kingdom of Iberia from the 3rd century BC to the 5th century AD. The chronicles mention that the Kingdom of Iberia and its capital were conquered by Alexander the Great in the 4th century BC, but certain historians do not accept this. Eventually, the ruler appointed by Alexander ruined the walls of Mtskheta and left only four fortresses, one of them known today as Armazi.

Ancient sources of the 4th-3rd centuries BC mention that Mtskheta had a number of neighborhoods. Among them, Armazis-tsikhe, Tzitzamuri, Jvari and others. Like other Georgian towns it was divided into the city proper and the citadel.

Both the excavations and The Georgian Chronicles tell about considerable construction in the Hellenistic period: residential houses, palaces and fortifications. A new wall around Mtskheta was built by the first Georgian king, Parnavaz, in the beginning of the 3rd century BC, and later strengthened by his son Saurmag in the late 3rd - early 2nd century BC. In late 2nd - early 1st century BC, king Parnajom strengthened his relations with Persians and invited Zoroastrian priests to settle in Mtskheta. This probably led to construction of Zoroastrian temples in the city. Meanwhile, no such archeological evidence exists. Again the walls of Mtskheta were improved during the reign of Bartom in the 1st century BC, and later also by Aderki, often identified with Pharasmanes I. The latter king is associated with the appearance of the first Christian communities in Kartli and the arrival of the Holy Tunic to Mtskheta, brought from Jerusalem by local Jews.

The city was strongly fortified at that period. Walls lined both sides of the Mtkvari River, and three forts protected it. The main citadel, Armazi, on Mount Bagineti controlled the entrance from the south and east, Tsitsamuri, at the base of Mount Jvari from the north, and Sarkine from the west.

Mtskheta was a site of early Christian activity resulting in the Christianization of Iberia, where Christianity was proclaimed the state religion in 337. It remains the headquarters of the Georgian Orthodox Church. Around that period Mtskheta was a culturally developed city. A gravestone dated between the late 4th and early 5th centuries, found in Samtavro necropolis, contains an epitaph in Greek, telling about the main architect and archizograph (artist) of Mtskheta Aurelius Acholis.

In the first years after the conversion of Georgia into Christianity, a small wooden church was built in the center of the city, later to become Svetitskhoveli Cathedral. Archeological excavations revealed the remnants of the wooden church within the cathedral. By the 5th century AD the small church was no longer satisfying the growing community of the city, and Vakhtang Gorgasali built a large basilica, the greatest church in Georgia dedicated to the Dormition of the Mother of God, Svetitskhoveli, which survived until the 11th century. The first katolikos was elected in the 5th century, and his residence was in Svetotskhoveli, in Mtskheta. By the 11th century, the earlier basilica of Svetitskhoveli was again too small, and Katolikos Melchizedek I built a new church on top of it.

=== Middle Ages ===
King Dachi of Iberia (early 6th century AD), who was the successor of Vakhtang I of Iberia, moved the capital from Mtskheta to the more easily defensible Tbilisi according to the will left by his father. Afterwards the importance of Mtskheta began to decline, while that of Tbilisi grew. However, Mtskheta continued as the coronation and burial place for most kings of Georgia until the end of georgian political independence in the 19th century. Mtskheta suffered tremendous damage during the Umayyad Caliphate's defeat of the Khazars between 736 and 739, but regained its prestige during the reign of king George I of Georgia and catholicos-Patriarch Melchizedek I of Georgia, who oversaw the construction of the modern buildings of the Svetitskhoveli and Samtavro Cathedrals. Timur conquered the area in the 15th century and burnt the city. The city experienced a period of revival during the reign of Alexander I of Georgia, who rebuilt svetitskhoveli in 1425 AD and therefore stabilised pilgrimage; but it would be attacked again in 1625 AD at the battle of tsitsamuri. These attacks reduced the size of the city, and by the time Georgia became part of Russia in 1801, it was little more than a village. However, industrialization improved the economic situation of the city.

=== Modern times ===
The old city lies at the confluence of the rivers Mtkvari and Aragvi.

In recognition of its role in the Georgian Christian history, Mtskheta was granted the status of a "Holy City" by Catholicos-Patriarch Ilia II of Georgia in accordance with the written testament of his 11th-century predecessor Melchizedek I of Georgia.

Panoramic view of Mtskheta city and confluence of the Kura and Aragvi rivers seen from Jvari monastery in September 2023

== Monuments ==
Historical Monuments of Mtskheta
UNESCO World Heritage Site
- Interactive map of Historical Monuments of Mtskheta
- Criteria: Cultural: iii, iv
- Reference: 708
- Inscription: 1994 (18th Session)
- Endangered: 2009 — 2016
- Area: 3.85 ha (9.5 acres)
- Buffer zone: 2,382.5 ha (5,887 acres)

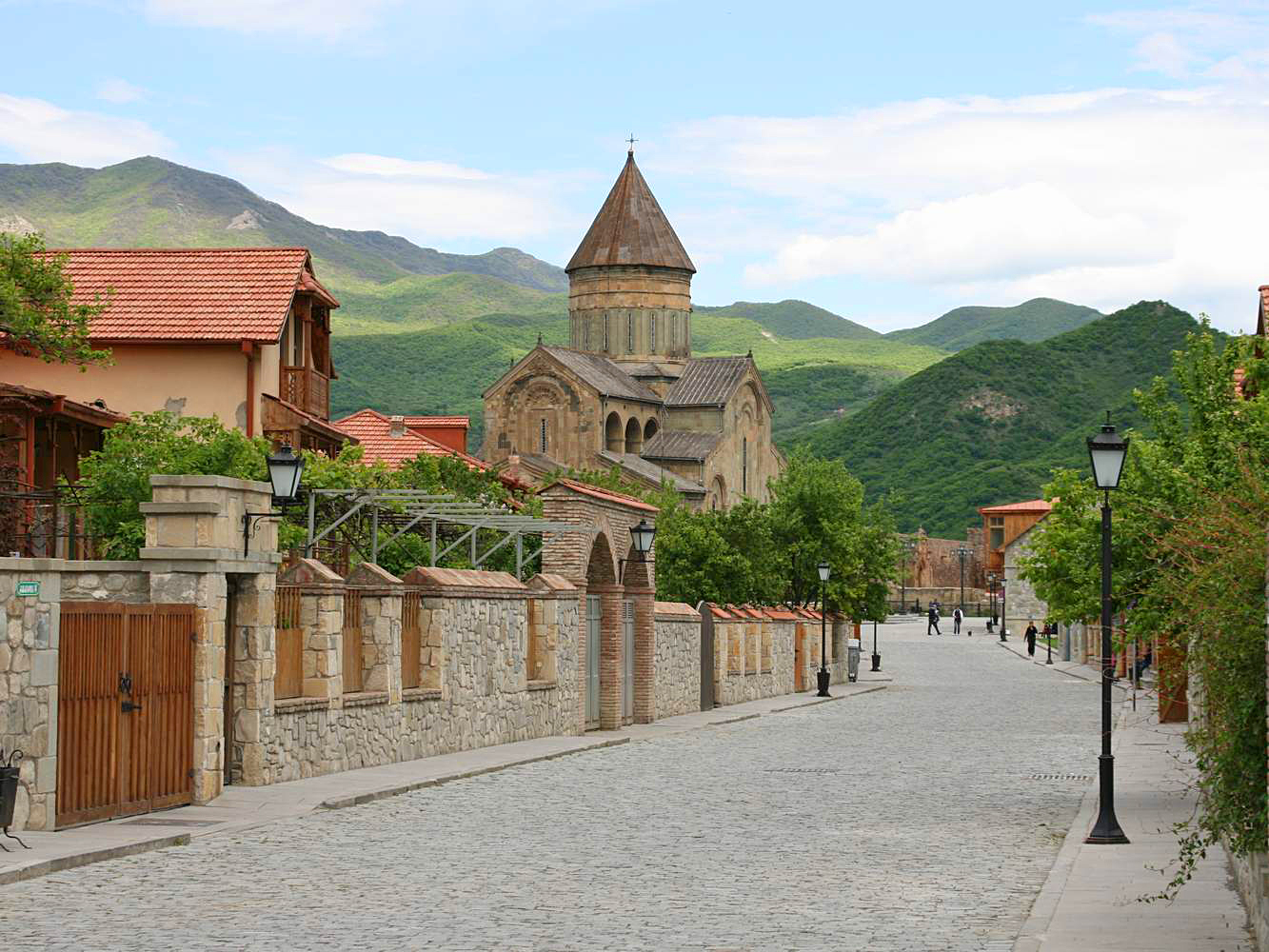
Svetitskhoveli seen from an old street

Svetitskhoveli Cathedral (11th century), Samtavro Monastery (4th century) and Jvari Monastery (6th century) in Mtskheta are amongst the most significant monuments of Georgian Christian architecture, and are historically significant in the development of medieval architecture throughout the Caucasus. Of special significance are early inscriptions, which form a valuable reference in the study of the origins of the early Georgian alphabet.. Samtavro necropolis, a burial place north of the monastery, is dated between the middle of the 3rd millennium BC and the 10th century.

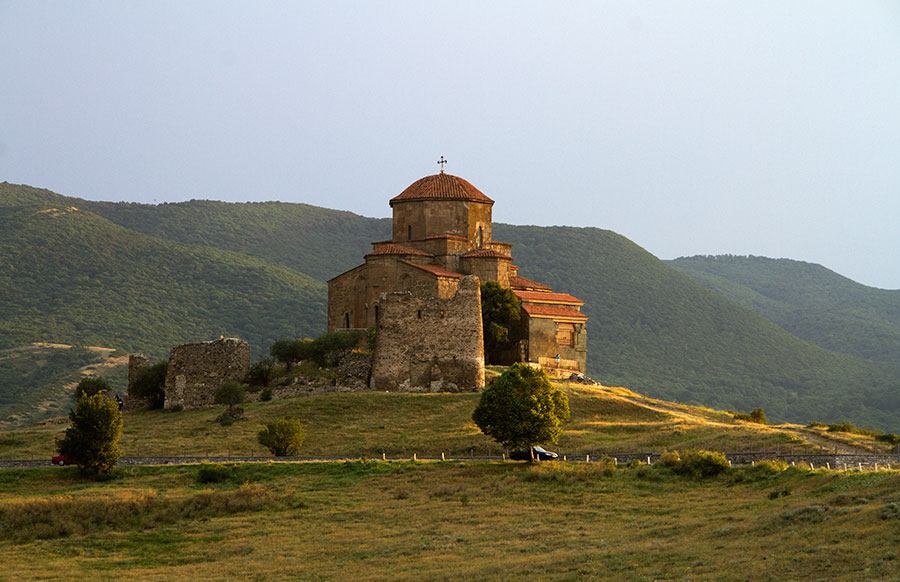
Jvari Monastery

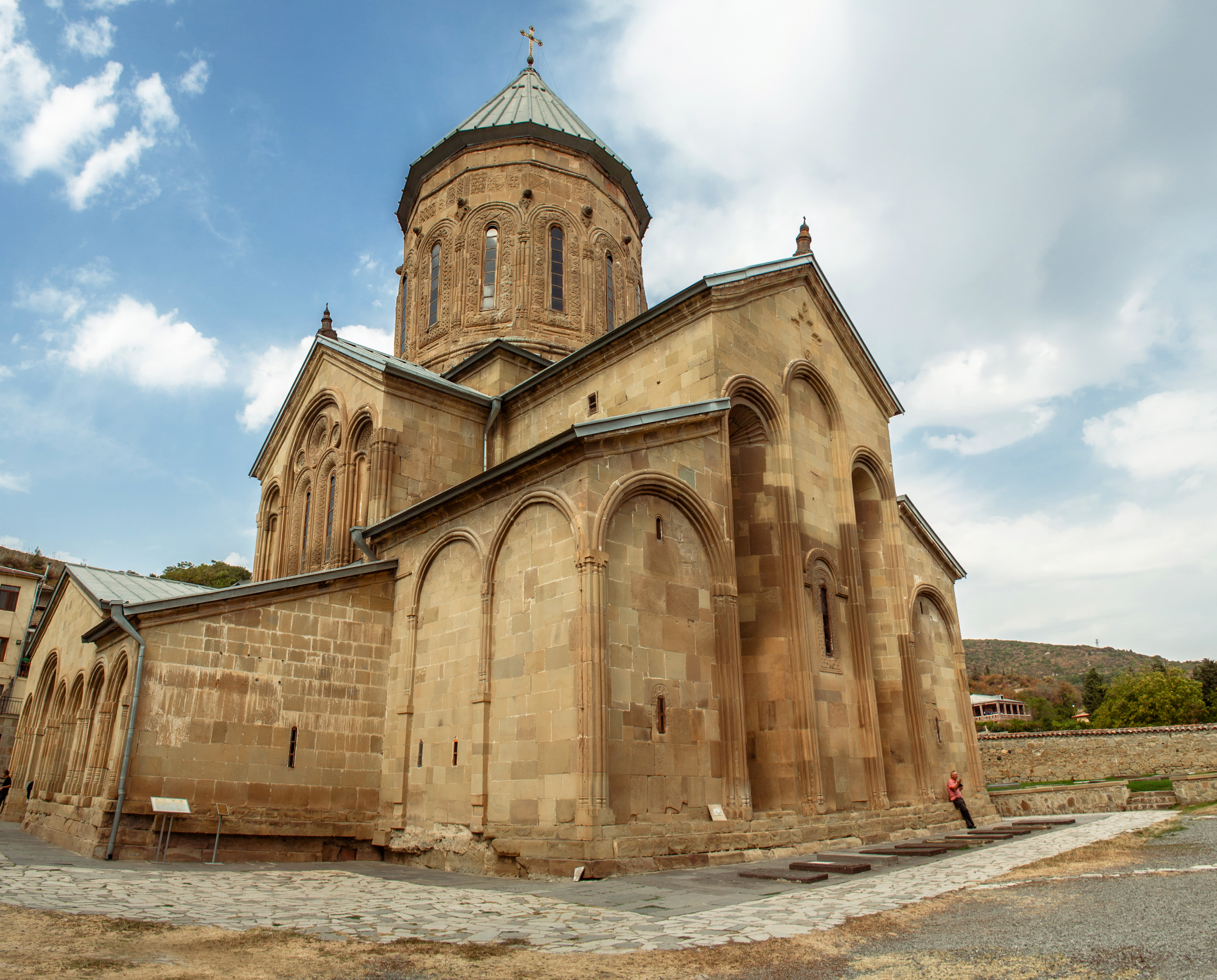
Samtavro Monastery

In the outskirts of Mtskheta are the ruins of Armaztsikhe fortress (3rd century BC), the Armaztsikhe acropolis (dating to the late 1st century BC), remains of a "Pompey's bridge" (according to legends built by Roman legionnaires of Pompey the Great in the 1st century BC), the fragmentary remains of a royal palace (1st–3rd century AD), a nearby tomb of the 1st century AD, and the fortress of Bebris tsikhe (14th century). The Institute of Archaeology, and the garden of Mikheil Mamulashvili are also worthy of note. There is also a monument to sculptor Elena Machabeli.

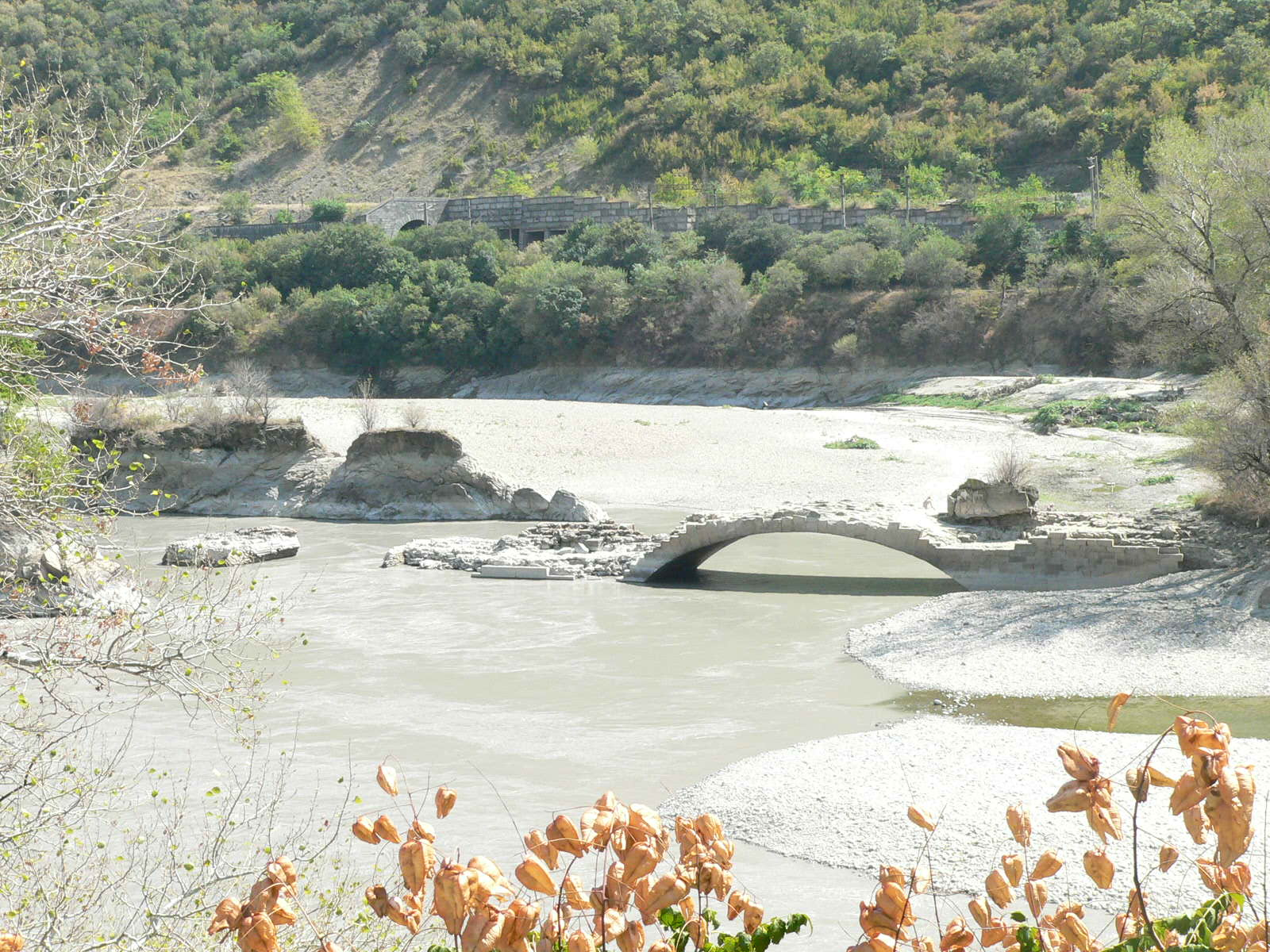
"Pompey's bridge", August 2008

A mausoleum of a rich woman from 1st century AD was recovered near Mtskheta train station. The structure imitates a house with well-processed quadrats and a fronton. The roof was covered with tile. Among the findings inside the mausoleum was a small bronze statue of young man playing flute.

== Threats ==
The Historical Monuments of Mtskheta were on UNESCO's List of World Heritage in Danger, citing "serious deterioration of the stonework and frescoes" as the main threat to the site's long-term preservation. They were removed from the list in 2016.

== International relations ==
Mtskheta is twinned with:

- Vagharshapat, Armenia (2016)
- Fındıklı, Turkey (2014)
- Leuville-sur-Orge, France (2001)
- Argos, Greece (1991)

== Notable people ==
- Pharnavaz I (4th–3rd century BC), King of Karti
- Konstantin Alekseevich Satunin (1863–1915), zoologist, died suddenly in Mtskheta
- Tochinoshin Tsuyoshi, (Levan Gorgadze born 1987), sumo wrestler

== See also ==
- Armazi

== General references ==
- Abashidze, Irakli. Ed. Georgian Encyclopedia. Vol. IX. Tbilisi, Georgia: 1985.
- Amiranashvili, Shalva. History of Georgian Art. Khelovneba: Tbilisi, Georgia: 1961.
- Grigol Khantsteli. Chronicles of Georgia.
- Rosen, Roger. Georgia: A Sovereign Country of the Caucasus. Odyssey Publications: Hong Kong, 1999. ISBN 962-217-748-4
