= Augustus's Eastern policy =

Foreign policy in the Roman Empire

- Part of Roman–Parthian Wars
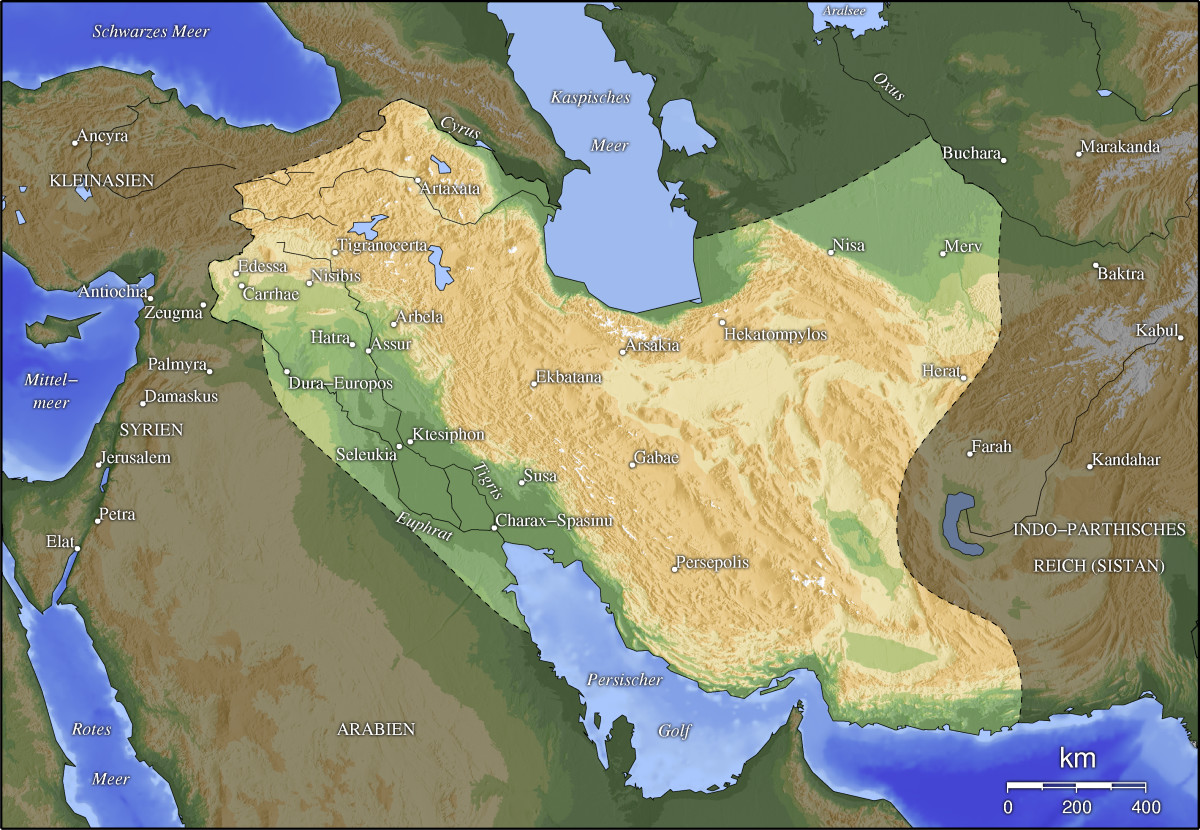
- The empire of the Parthians
Date	30 BC – 14 AD
Location	Eastern Limes
Result	Maintenance of the stability between the Roman Empire and the Parthian Empire; Parthian invasions are all repelled

Belligerents
Roman Empire	Parthians, Armenians

Commanders and leaders
Augustus, Agrippa, Tiberius, Gaius Caesar	Phraates IV, Phraates V, Vonones I (POW)

Strength
- 4/5 Roman legions totaling about 20,000/25,000 armed men in addition to auxilia

Augustus's Eastern policy represents the political-strategic framework of the eastern imperial borders of the Roman Empire at the time of Augustus's principate, following the occupation of Egypt at the end of the civil war between Octavian and Mark Antony (31–30 BC).

== War of occupation ==
=== Historical context ===
Almost in spite of Augustus's seemingly peaceful disposition, his principate was the most troubled by wars than those of most of his successors. Only Trajan and Marcus Aurelius found themselves fighting simultaneously on several fronts, as did Augustus. Under Augustus, in fact, almost every frontier was involved, from the northern ocean to the shores of Pontus, from the mountains of Cantabria to the desert of Ethiopia, in a preordained strategic plan to complete conquests along the entire Mediterranean basin and in Europe, with the borders moving further north along the Danube and further east along the Elbe (instead of the Rhine).

Augustus's campaigns were carried out with the aim of consolidating the disorganized conquests of the Republican age, which made numerous annexations of new territories essential. While the East could remain more or less as Antony and Pompey had left it, in Europe between the Rhine and the Black Sea a new territorial reorganization was needed so as to ensure internal stability and, at the same time, more defensible borders.

=== Prior situation ===
Mark Antony's campaigns in Parthia had been unsuccessful. Not only had Rome's honor not been avenged following the defeat suffered by Consul Marcus Licinius Crassus at Carrhae in 53 BCE, but also Roman armies had been defeated again in enemy territory, and Armenia itself had entered the Roman sphere of influence only briefly. It was not until the end of the civil war, with the Battle of Actium (in 31 BC) and the occupation of Egypt (in 30 BC), that Octavian was able to concentrate on the Parthian problem and on the arrangement of the entire Roman East. The Roman world expected perhaps a series of campaigns and even the conquest of Parthia itself, considering that Augustus was the adopted son of the great Caesar, who had planned a campaign in the footsteps of the Macedonian.

=== Forces in the field ===
Augustus was able to field an army composed of numerous legions:

- for the Eastern front: Legio III Gallica, Legio VI Ferrata, Legio X Fretensis and Legio XII Fulminata.

=== Eastern Policy ===
==== West of the Euphrates ====
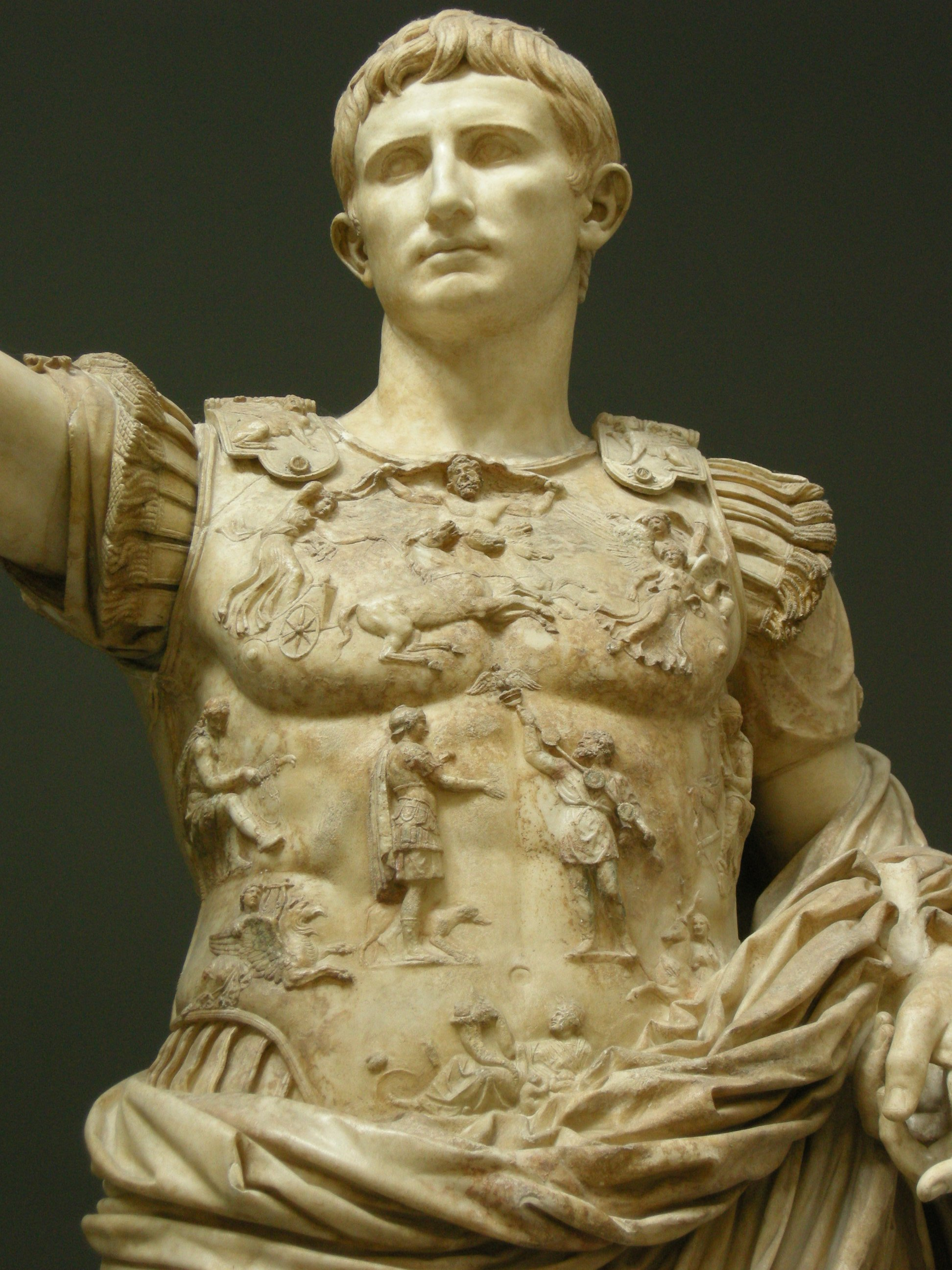
Detail of the Augustus of Prima Porta, a statue of Emperor Augustus, portrayed in military parade gear. On the breastplate is depicted the scene of the handing over of the legionary standards of Marcus Licinius Crassus by the king of the Parthians, Phraates IV

West of the Euphrates, Augustus tried to reorganize the Roman East, either by incorporating some vassal states and turning them into Roman provinces (such as Amyntas's Galatia in 25 BC, or Herod Archelaus's Judaea in 6 (after there had been some initial unrest in 4 BC upon the death of Herod the Great), or by strengthening old alliances with local kings who had become "client kings of Rome" (as happened to Archelaus, king of Cappadocia, Asander, king of the Bosporan Kingdom, Polemon I, king of Pontus, as well as the rulers of Emesa, Iturea, Commagene, Cilicia, Chalcis, Nabatea, Iberia, Colchis and Albania).

==== East of the Euphrates ====
East of the Euphrates, in Armenia, Parthia, and Media, Augustus aimed to achieve the greatest political interference without intervening with costly military action. In fact, Octavian aimed to resolve the conflict with the Parthians diplomatically, with the Parthian king Phraates IV returning in 20 BC the standards lost by Crassus at the Battle of Carrhae in 53 BC. He could have turned against Parthia to avenge the defeats suffered by Crassus and Antony; instead, he believed a peaceful coexistence of the two empires was possible, with the Euphrates as the boundary for each other's areas of influence. In fact, both empires had more to lose from a defeat than they could realistically hope to gain from a victory. Throughout his long principate, Augustus concentrated his main military efforts in Europe. The focal point in the East, however, was the kingdom of Armenia, which, because of its geographical location, had been the subject of contention between Rome and Parthia for the past fifty years. He aimed to make Armenia a Roman buffer state, with the enthronement of a king appreciated by Rome, and if necessary imposed by force of arms.

===== First Parthian crisis: Augustus recovers the standards of Crassus (23–20 BC) =====
Augustus: denarius
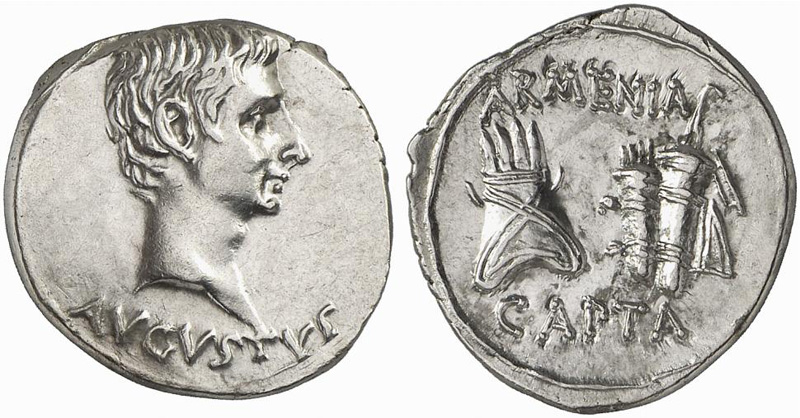
First side of the image: AUGUSTUS, head of Augustus toward the right;
Second side of the image: ARMENIA CAPTA, an Armenian tiara, a bow and quiver with arrows.
Silver, 3.77 g; minted in 19–18 BC, after Armenia returned to the area of Roman influence.
Augustus: denarius
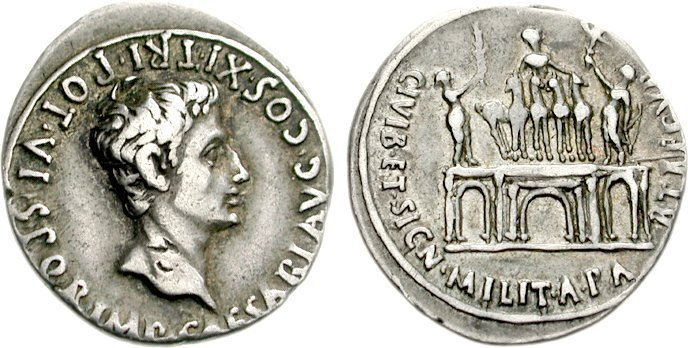
First side of the image: S • P • Q • R • IMP • CAESARI • AVG • COS • XI • TRI • POT • VI •, head of Augustus toward the right;
Second side of the image: CIVIB • ET • SIGN • MILIT • A • PA-RT • RECVP •, triumphal arch of Augustus: above the contralateral arch there is a quadriga; above the lateral arches there is a figure of each; on the left there is a figure turned to the right holding a signum in his right hand raised toward the sky; on the right, on the other hand, there is a figure facing left, holding an eagle in his right and a bow in his left.
Silver, 3.86 gr, 6 h; Spanish mint of Tarraco, minted in 18 BC

In 23 BCE, shortly after Marcus Vipsanius Agrippa was sent to the East as deputy regent of the emperor Augustus himself, ambassadors sent by the king of the Parthians arrived in Rome, demanding that both Tiridates II, the former Parthian ruler (who had taken refuge in Rome since 26 BCE), and the new king's young son be handed over to him. Augustus, while refusing to hand over the former, which could still come in handy in the future, decided to release the son of King Phraates IV, on the condition that the standards of Marcus Licinius Crassus and the prisoners of war from 53 BC be returned to the Roman state.

In Armenia, meanwhile, a chronic division reigned among the nobles: the pro-Roman party had sent an embassy to Augustus demanding a trial of King Artaxias II, his deposition and the replacement on the throne of Armenia of his younger brother, Tigranes III, who had lived in Rome since 29 BCE. At the end of 21 BC, Augustus ordered his stepson Tiberius, who was then twenty-one years old, to lead a legionary army from the Balkans to the East, with the task of placing Tigranes III on the Armenian throne and recovering the imperial standards.

Augustus himself traveled to the East. His arrival and the approach of Tiberius's army produced the desired effect on the Parthian king. Faced with the danger of a Roman invasion that could have cost him the throne, Phraates IV decided to relent and, while risking displeasing his own people, returned the standards and the surviving Roman prisoners. Augustus was proclaimed imperator for the ninth time. The return of the standards and prisoners was a diplomatic success comparable to the best victories achieved on the battlefield.

Parthi quoque et Armeniam vindicanti facile cesserunt et signa militaria, quae M. Crasso et M. Antonio ademerant, reposcenti reddiderunt obsidesque insuper optulerunt, denique, pluribus quondam de regno concertantibus, nonnisi ab ipso electum probaverunt.
The Parthians not only gave him without any problems the kingdom of Armenia that Augustus claimed, but, at his request, they also returned to him the military standards [the legionary eagles] that they had taken away from Marcus Licinius Crassus and Mark Antony, as well as offering him hostages. And when, at a given time, many were those who were contending for the throne, only those whom he [Augustus] had chosen were recognized.

—Suetonius, Augustus, 21.

Quodam autem muneris die Parthorum obsides tunc primum missos per mediam harenam ad spectaculum induxit superque se subsellio secundo collocavit.
One day, during some performances he led to the spectacle some Parthian hostages, the first ones sent to Rome, led them to the middle of the arena, and placed them in the second row, above himself.

—Suetonius, Augustus, 43.

Augustus, who had thus decided, upon recovering the standards lost at Carrhae, to abandon the aggressive policy that Caesar and Antony had pursued in the East, was able to establish friendly relations with the neighboring Parthian Empire. He could have avenged the defeat and betrayal suffered by Crassus in 53 BC. Instead, he considered a peaceful coexistence of the two empires to be convenient, with the Euphrates as the boundary of each other's domains.

Attempting to subdue Parthia would have required considerable manpower and financial resources, as well as the possibility of shifting the empire's focus from the Mediterranean further east, now that Augustus was intent on concentrating his efforts on the European front. Relations between the Parthians depended, therefore, more on diplomacy than on war. Only in the East did Rome face another great "superpower of classical antiquity," although not comparable to the strength and size of Rome.

The friendly relations established between Rome and the Parthians eventually favored the pro-Roman party in neighboring Armenia, and before Tiberius reached the Euphrates, Artaxias II was assassinated by his own courtiers. Tiberius, having entered the country without encountering resistance and in the presence of the legions, solemnly placed the royal diadem on Tigranes III's head, and Augustus was able to announce that he had conquered Armenia, while refraining from annexing it.

===== Second Parthian crisis (1 BC – 4 AD) =====
In 1 BC, Artavasdes III, a pro-Roman king of Armenia, was eliminated by the intervention of the Parthians and the pretender to the throne Tigranes IV. This was a serious affront to Roman prestige. Augustus, no longer able to count on the cooperation of Tiberius (who had retired in voluntary retreat to Rhodes) and Agrippa now dead for more than a decade, as well as being himself too old to undertake another trip to the East, decided to send his young nephew Gaius Caesar to deal with the Armenian question, giving him proconsular powers superior to that of all provincial governors of the East. Also sent with him was Marcus Lollius, who had gained experience in the East a few years earlier when he had to reorganize the newly created province of Galatia.

Gaius Caesar reached Syria in the beginning of the year 1 and there began his consulship. When Phraates V, king of Parthia, learned of the young prince's mission, he thought it would be more expedient to negotiate than to deal with the crisis harshly, risking a new war. He demanded, in exchange for his willingness to negotiate, the return of his four half-brothers who lived in Rome and posed a potential threat to his future security. Augustus, naturally, could only refuse to cede family members so important to the eastern cause. Instead, he enjoined him to leave Armenia.

Phraates V refused to leave the control of Armenia in the hands of the Romans, and continued to maintain his supervision of it over the new king, Tigranes IV, who, however, sent a number of ambassadors to Rome with gifts, acknowledging Augustus's power over his kingdom, and asking him to leave him on the throne. Augustus, satisfied with this recognition, accepted the gifts, but asked Tigranes to go to Gaius in Syria to negotiate his possible stay on the throne of Armenia. Tigranes III's behavior induced Phraates V to change his mind, forcing him to come to terms with Rome. He gave up his claims to see his half-brothers return, and declared himself ready to end all interference in Armenia.

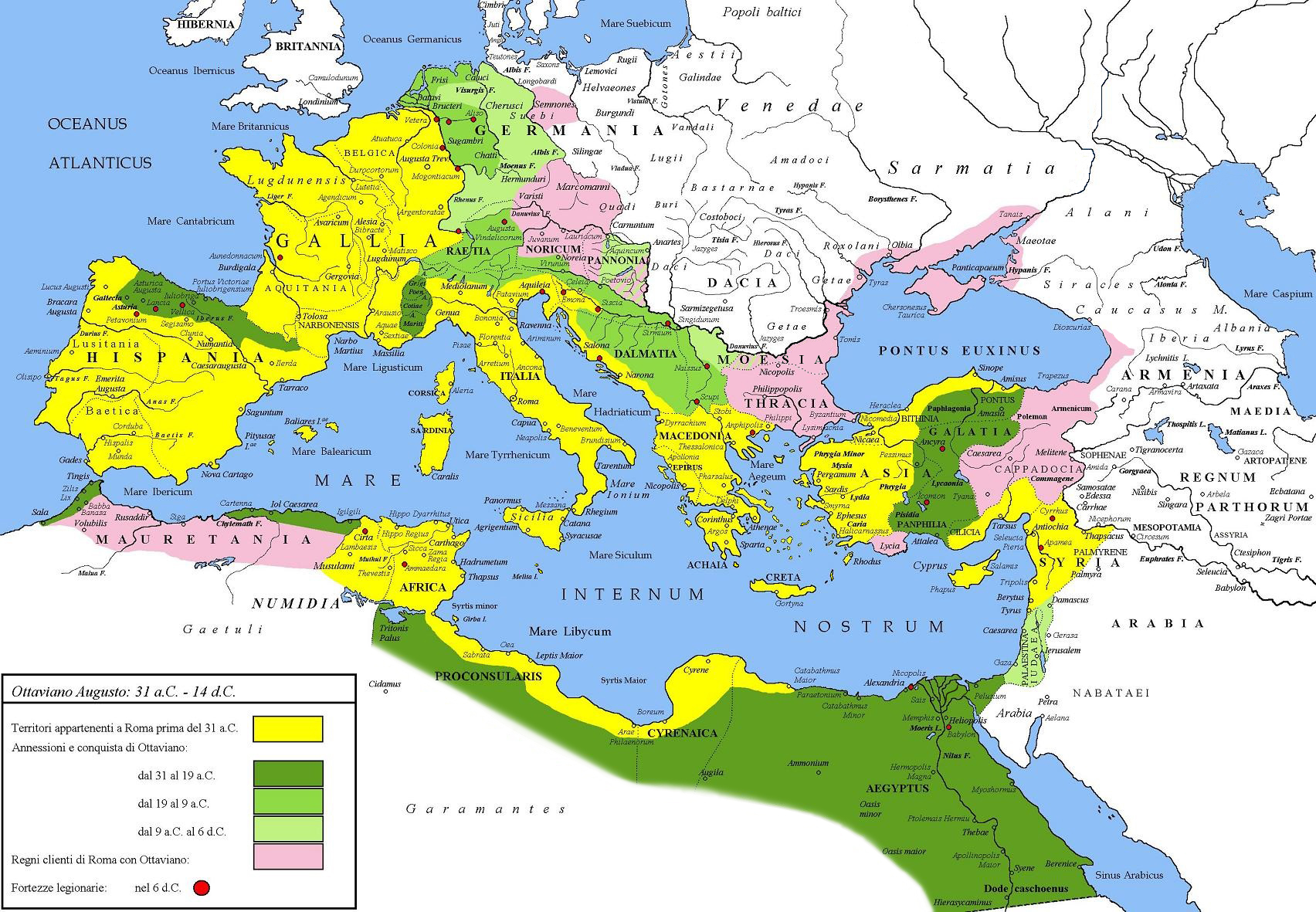
The new Augustan provincial arrangement in the East.

That same year a pact was concluded between the Roman prince Gaius Caesar, and the great king of the Parthians, in neutral territory on an island in the Euphrates, again recognizing this river as the natural boundary between the two empires. This meeting sanctioned the mutual recognition between Rome and Parthia, of independent states with equal rights of sovereignty. Before bidding farewell, the Parthian ruler Phraates V informed Gaius that Marcus Lollius had abused his role and had accepted rewards from powerful kings of eastern states. The accusation was true, and Gaius, after reviewing the evidence, removed Lollius from his retinue. A few days later Lollius died, probably by suicide, and he was replaced in the role of adviser to the prince by Publius Sulpicius Quirinius, mainly because of his military skills and diplomatic experience gained in his previous career.

Meanwhile, Tigranes IV had been killed in the course of a war, possibly fomented by anti-Roman Armenian nobles opposed to submission to Rome. Tigranes's death was followed by the abdication of Erato, his half-sister and wife, and Gaius, in the name of Augustus, gave the crown to Ariobarzanes, already king of Media since 20 BC. The anti-Roman party, refusing to recognize Ariobarzane as the new king of Armenia, caused unrest everywhere, forcing Gaius Caesar to intervene directly with the army. The Roman prince, shortly before attacking the fortress of Artagira (perhaps near Kagizman in the Aras River valley), was invited to an audience with the fort's commander, a certain Addon, who apparently wanted to reveal to him important details about the Parthian king's wealth. This turned out, however, to be a trap, for upon his arrival Addon and his guards attempted to kill the Roman prince, who managed to survive the ambush although he was badly wounded.

The fort was, following these events, besieged and taken after a long resistance, and the revolt was quelled, but Gaius never recovered from his wound. He died two years later, in 4 AD in Lycia. This was the tragic end of years of negotiations, which led to a new modus vivendi between Parthia and Rome, and where the latter established its supremacy over the important Armenian state.

== Consequences ==
Augustus's presence in the East immediately after the Battle of Actium, in 30–29 BC then from 22 to 19 BC, as well as Agrippa's between 23 and 21 BC and again between 16 and 13 BC, demonstrated the importance of this strategic area. It was necessary to reach a modus vivendi with Parthia, the only power capable of creating problems for Rome along its eastern borders. In fact, both empires had more to lose from a defeat than they could realistically hope to gain from a victory. Throughout his long principate, Augustus concentrated his main military efforts in Europe.

Parthia effectively accepted that to the west of the Euphrates Rome organized the states as it pleased. The crucial point in the East, however, was the kingdom of Armenia, which, because of its geographical location, had been a subject of contention between Rome and Parthia for fifty years. The aim was to make Armenia a Roman client-state, with the enthronement of a king sympathetic to Rome, and if necessary imposed by force of arms.

== See also ==
- Augustus
- Roman Empire
- Parthian Empire

== Bibliography ==
- Augustus, Res gestae divi Augusti.
- Cassius Dio, Roman History, books LIII–LIX.
- Florus, Epitome of Roman History, II.
- Suetonius, The Twelve Caesars, books II and III.
- Tacitus, Annals, I–II.
- Velleius Paterculus, History of Rome, II.
- AAVV (1975). Cambridge Ancient History. L'impero romano da Augusto agli Antonini. Milan. pp. Vol. VIII.
- F. A. Arborio Mella, L'impero persiano da Ciro il Grande alla conquista araba, Milan 1980, Ed. Mursia.
- Grant, Michael (1984). Gli imperatori romani. Roma: Newton & Compton.
- E. Horst, Cesare, Milan 1982.
- D. Kennedy, L'Oriente, in Il mondo di Roma imperiale: la formazione, edited by J. Wacher, Bari 1989.
- Levi, Mario Attilio, Augusto e il suo tempo, Milan 1994.
- Santo Mazzarino (1976). L'Impero romano. Bari: Laterza. pp. Vol. I.
- Fergus Millar, The roman near east 31 BC – AD 337, Harvard 1993.
- Scarre, Chris (1995). Chronicle of the Roman Emperors. London.
- Scullard, Howard (1992). Storia del mondo romano. Milan: Rizzoli.
- Southern, Pat, Augustus, London–N.Y. 2001.
- Spinosa, Antonio (1996). Augusto. Il grande baro. Milan: Mondadori. ISBN 9788804410416.
- Spinosa, Antonio (1991). Tiberio. L'imperatore che non amava Roma. Milan: Mondadori.
- Syme, Ronald (1992). L'aristocrazia augustea. Milan: Rizzoli.
- Syme, Ronald (2002). The Roman Revolution. Oxford.
