= Timeline of Armenian history =

This is a timeline of Armenian history, comprising important legal and territorial changes and political events in Armenia and its predecessor states. To read about the background to these events, see History of Armenia. See also the list of Armenian kings.

== 12000 BC ==
Year	Date	Event
ca. 12000		Some Ughtasar Petroglyphs carved onto dark brownish-black volcanic stones left behind by an extinct volcano

== 43rd century BC ==
Year	Date	Event
ca. 4300		Areni-1 cave late Chalcolithic/Early Bronze Age ritual site and settlement, was inhabited by humans

== 40th century BC ==
Year	Date	Event
ca. 4000 BC		Godedzor archeological site was built

== 30th century BC ==
Year	Date	Event
ca. 3000 BC		Shengavit site inhabited during a series of settlement phases from approximately 3000 BC to 2500 BC

== 25th century BC ==
Year	Date	Event
2492 BC	11 August	A legendary battle recounted by Movses Khorenatsi, said to have taken place in the valley of Hoşap River, Vaspurakan.

== 24th century BC ==
Year	Date	Event
2400 BC		The Book of Genesis identifies the land of Ararat as the resting place of Noah's Ark after the "great deluge" described there. The Indo-Europeans were people who presumably spread from the Caucasus, settling on lands along the way. Armenian is one of the Indo-European language branches.

== 23rd century BC ==
Year	Date	Event
2300 BC		The legendary figure Hayk creates the Armenian nation in the Ararat region. (Akkadians mention Armani in 2300 BC)

== 20th century BC ==
Year	Date	Event
2000 BC		Trialeti culture

== 17th century BC ==
Year	Date	Event
1700 BC		Aram, Armenian patriarch mentioned in the History of Armenia (Moses of Chorene) (dated 5th century AD) See also: Mitanni

== 15th century BC ==
Year	Date	Event
1450 BC		Artatama I (Thutmose III of Egypt, mentions the people of Ermenen in 1446 BC)

== 14th century BC ==
Year	Date	Event
1400		Artashumara
1384		Artatama II

== 12th century BC ==
Year	Date	Event
1200 BC		Nairi, a confederation of tribes in the Armenian Highlands, roughly corresponding to the modern Van and Hakkâri provinces of modern Turkey.

== 9th century BC ==
Year	Date	Event
860 BC		Foundation of the Kingdom of Urartu with Aramé.
834 BC		Reign of Sarduri I who constructs Tushpa (Van). (to 828 BC)
810 BC		Reign of Menuas who conquers the Araratian fields. (to 785 BC)

== 8th century BC ==
Year	Date	Event
785 BC		Reign of Argishtis I.
782 BC		Construction of the fortress of Erebuni (modern Yerevan).

== 7th century BC ==
Year	Date	Event
680 BC		End of the Argishti II's reign.
680 BC		Beginning of the reign of Rusa II.

== 6th century BC ==
Year	Date	Event
585 BC		Conquest of Urartu by the Medes.
570 BC		Reign of Orontes I Sakavakyats.
533 BC		Satrapy of Armenia is formed.
512 BC		Armenia is annexed to Persia by Darius I. Urartu is officially called Armenia in the Behistun inscription.

== 5th century BC ==
Year	Date	Event
401 BC		Orontes I (Yervand I).

== 4th century BC ==
Year	Date	Event
331 BC		Alexander the Great attacks Persia and defeats Darius III, but never conquers Armenia. As a result, Armenia regains its independence from Persia.
331 BC		Reign of Orontes III begins.

== 3rd century BC ==
Year	Date	Event
260 BC		Reign of Arsames I begins.
235 BC		Foundation of Arsamosata.
228 BC		Death of Arsames I.
228 BC		Eldest son of Arsames I Xerxes became king of Commagene, Sophene and Armenia.
212 BC		Reign of Orontes IV begins.
200 BC		Orontes IV was killed by his own army, by betrayal from Artaxias I.

== 2nd century BC ==
Year	Date	Event
190 BC		Artaxias I reclaims the sovereignty of Armenia from the Seleucids by establishing the Artaxiad dynasty with Artaxata as the capital.

== 1st century BC ==
Year	Date	Event
95 BC		Accession of power by Tigranes the Great.
93 BC		Invasion of Cappadocia
88 BC		Conquest of Atropatene, Gordyene, and Osrhoene
83 BC		Conquest of Syria, Phoenicia, and Cilicia
71 BC		Conquest of Acre.
69 BC		Tigranes' army is defeated at the Battle of Tigranocerta against Lucullus' Roman army.
68 BC		Lucullus is beaten off from Artaxata.
67 BC		Lucullus is recalled to Rome.
66 BC		Pompey invades Armenia, but returns to Roman land after being offered a generous sum of money by Tigranes.
55 BC		Death of Tigranes the Great. Artavasdes II continues to rule Armenia.
55 BC		Reign of Artavasdes.
34 BC		Mark Antony campaigned against Armenia.
34 BC		End of Artavasdes II's reign.
31 BC		Antony's defeat at the Battle of Actium, Cleopatra had Artavasdes decapitated.
30 BC		Beginning of Artaxias II's reign
20 BC		Artaxias II was killed by his rebellious subjects.
20 BC		Beginning of Tigranes III's reign.
8 BC		The Armenians installed Tigranes IV as King as the successor to his father.

== 1st century ==
Year	Date	Event
1		End of the Artaxiad dynasty in Armenia. Arsacid dynasty of Parthia incorporates Armenia.
53		Tiridates I reaffirms Armenian independence by founding the Arsacid dynasty of Armenia.
58		Roman general Corbulo invades Armenia with the assistance of the Iberians and Commagenians.
62		The combined Armenian-Parthian forces defeated Roman army near place called Rhandeia.
63		Treaty of Rhandeia.
66		Tiridates is crowned in Rome by Nero, after he and Corbulo came to an agreement.
72		War against the Alans.
77		Tiridates I built Garni Temple.
88		End of Tiridates I’s reign.

== 2nd century ==
Year	Date	Event
109		End of Sanatruk's reign.
110		Axidares was put on the Armenian throne by his paternal uncle, King Osroes I of Parthia without Roman consultation.
114		Roman emperor Trajan annexes Armenia and declares war on Parthia.
117		Beginning of the reign of Vologases I.
c. 120		The old town of Vardgesavan was renovated and renamed Vagharshapat.
161		Vologases IV invaded Armenia and replaced its Roman client king Sohaemus with his own son Pacorus.
191		Beginning of the reign of Khosrov I.

== 3rd century ==
Year	Date	Event
228		Tiridates II repels Sassanid invasion.
287		Beginning of the reign of Tiridates III.

== 4th century ==
Year	Date	Event
301		Armenia becomes the first official Christian state in the world, King Tiridates III proclaims Christianity as the official state religion of Armenia. Zoroastrianism starts to decline gradually.
330		End of Tiridates III's reign.
356		Council of Ashtishat called by Saint Nerses, catholicos of the Armenian church.
370		Beginning of the reign of Pap.
371		Roman-Armenian forces defeated Sasanian army near Bagavan.
374		Murder of Pap.
374		Beginning of the reign of Varazdat.
386		King Khosrov III is crowned as king. Byzantine annexes the western parts of Armenia (Armenia Minor) to the Byzantine Empire.
387		Division of Armenia into Western and Eastern parts per the Peace of Acisilene between the Sassanid Persians and Byzantines.
392		Armenia regains its might by the coronation of King Vramshapuh in 392.

== 5th century ==
Year	Date	Event
405		Mesrop Mashtots invents the Armenian alphabet.
414		King Vramshapuh dies.
415		Shapur IV, son of the Sasanid king Yazdgerd I, is put on the Armenian throne.
422		Reign of Armenia king Artaxias IV, last ruler of the Arsacid dynasty.
428		End of the Arsacid dynasty of Armenia. Marzpanate Armenia era as part of the Sassanid Empire begins.
439		Mamikonian prince Hamazasp marries Sahakanuysh and so unifies the estates of the Mamikonians and descendants of Saint Gregory the Illuminator.
449		The Sasanid king, Yazdegerd II, declares an order according to which all Christians in his realm must convert to Zoroastrianism.
451		The Battle of Avarayr, led by Vartan Mamikonian, secures the Christian religion in Armenia.
484		the Treaty of Nvarsak was signed between Vahan Mamikonian and Balash.
491		The Armenian Church remains faithful to its mono-physical faith and separates itself from the churches in Rome and Byzantine.

== 6th century ==
Year	Date	Event
506		First Council of Dvin.

== 7th century ==
Year	Date	Event
607		Third Council of Dvin.
639		The first Arab invasion under the leadership of Abd ar-Rahman ibn Rabiah devastates the region of Taron.
642		Arabs storm the city of Dvin killing 12,000 its inhabitants and taking 35,000 into slavery.
645		Theodorus Rshtuni and other Armenian nakharars accepted Muslim rule over Armenia.
650		Armenia becomes the main battleground of the Khazar–Arab Wars & Byzantine–Arab Wars which leaves the lands depopulated. (to 750)

== 8th century ==
Year	Date	Event
790		The Principality of Hamamshen is established in the modern day area of eastern Rize Province, Turkey.

== 9th century ==
Year	Date	Event
861		Ashot I Bagratuni is recognized as prince of princes by the Baghdad court, followed by a war against local Muslim emirs. (to 862)
885		Ashot wins and is thus recognized King of the Armenians by Baghdad in 885.
886		Formal recognition of Armenian sovereignty by Constantinople.
891		King Ashot I dies and is succeeded by his son Smbat I, in 892.

== 10th century ==
Year	Date	Event
961		King Ashot III (953–977) transfers the capital from Kars to Ani, which came to be considered the "City of a 1001 Churches" which rivaled other metropolises like Baghdad and Constantinople.

== 11th century ==
Year	Date	Event
1016		Seljuk Turks first appear in the region.
1045		Armenia falls to Byzantine troops, and an exodus from the Armenian lands begins.
1064		Byzantine Ani, once the capital of Bagratid Armenia, is conquered and destroyed by the Seljuk Turks.
1071		After the Battle of Manzikert, Seljuk dominance is established over Anatolia and a large number of Turkish tribes migrate to the region.
1072		The Seljuks sell Ani to the Shaddadid, a Kurdish tribe ruling a territory coinciding with modern-day Armenia.
1078		Establishment of the Armenian Principality of Cilicia, led by the Rubenid dynasty.
1095		The First Crusade is launched by Pope Urban I.

== 12th century ==
Year	Date	Event
1187		Debut of Leon II's reign as prince.
1194		After the decline of the Seljuk dominance in the region, Eastern Anatolia is ruled by a slew of Turkish emirates and tribes, such as the Ahlatshahs, Mengujekids, Saltukids and the Artuqids. (to 1241)
1198		Leon II "the Magnificent" managed to secure his crown, becoming the first King of Armenian Cilicia.

== 13th century ==
Year	Date	Event
1219		Death of Leon II.
1241		Mongol Invasion of Anatolia, much of the sedentary population of Armenia is slaughtered. (to 1244)
1256		Turco-Mongol rule continues in Eastern Anatolia under the Ilkhanate rulers and their Turkish and Kurdish vassals. (to 1335)

== 14th century ==
Year	Date	Event
1335		The decline of Mongol power leads Armenia to be dominated once again by Anatolian Turkoman tribes such as the Chobanids. (to 1400)
1375		Fall of the Armenian kingdom of Cilicia to the Mameluks of Egypt and their Ramadanid vassals.
1400		Tamerlane's devastating invasion of Georgia, Armenia and Central Anatolia leads to the slaughter of large portions of the population of Armenia and the enslavement of over 60,000 people from Anatolia and the Caucasus.

== 15th century ==
Year	Date	Event
1405		After Tamerlane's death, Anatolia becomes a battleground between the rival tribal confederations of the Ak Koyunlu and the Kara Koyunlu.
1461		Armenian Patriarchate of Constantinople established by the then Ottoman Emperor, Mehmed II.
1478		Armenian migration to Bruges, Belgium.

== 16th century ==
Year	Date	Event
1502		The Safavid dynasty is established in Persia, that conquers Armenia.
1512		Printing of first Armenian books.
1514		The Ottoman-Persian Wars rage in the Armenian Highlands for the first time, the Ottomans temporarily gain Western Armenia.
1519		Decree of King Sigismund I that Armenians in Poland be governed under code of laws by Mkhitar Gosh.
1519		The first Jelali revolts; clashes between Sunnite Turks and Kurds and Shi'ite Qizilbash cause friction in Eastern Anatolia. (to 1528)
1520		Large portions of Armenia are conquered by Selim I.
1532		Ottoman-Safavid War (1532-1555) commences.
1555		Peace of Amasya signed between the Ottomans and Safavids. Western Armenia falls in Ottoman hands, Eastern Armenia stays under Persian rule.
1567		Establishment of Armenian printing press in Constantinople.
1598		Continuation of the devastating Jelali revolts in Anatolia. (to 1611)

== 17th century ==
Year	Date	Event
1603		Shah Abbas of Persia invades Ottoman Armenia (to 1618) and reestablishes full control over Eastern Armenia and large parts of Western Armenia as part of his empire.
1605		When forced to abandon the siege of Kars, Shah Abbas orders the complete destruction of many Armenian towns and villages and deports over 300,000 Armenians to Persia, of which only half survive.
1623		The final Ottoman-Safavid War rages in both parts of historic Armenia.
1639		Treaty of Zuhab signed between the Ottomans and Safavids. Western Armenia falls decisively under Ottoman rule. Safavids remain in possession of Eastern Armenia.
1648		Major earthquake in Van.

== 18th century ==
Year	Date	Event
1712		Sayat Nova, renowned Armenian poet troubadour.
1722		David Bek leads the national liberation movement in 1722, but passes away in 1728.
1747		The Persians establish the Karabakh Khanate.
1759		Arrival of Hovsep Emin in Armenia
1778		Establishment of Nor Nakhichevan

== 19th century ==
Year	Date	Event
1809	15 October	Khachatur Abovian, renowned novelist, poet, and playwright, is born.
1810		Zeitountsi revolts.
1811		Mkhitarist order of Vienna founded.
1813		Treaty of Gulistan. All of Eastern Armenia remains under Persian rule, except for the Armenians in Karabakh, which had already de facto become part of the Russian Empire.
1824		Founding of Nersessian Academy in Tiflis
1826		Nickolas Balian, architect in Constantinople (to 1858)
1827		Occupation of Yerevan by Russian forces
1828		Treaty of Turkmanchay. Eastern Armenia is forcefully ceded by Persia to Russia per the Russo-Persian War (1826-1828), strengthening Russian control of Transcaucasus.
1836		The Russian government enacts the Polozhenie, a statute greatly restricting the power of the Armenian Church.
1894–1896		Hamidian massacres; an estimated 80,000–300,000 are killed.

== 20th century ==
Year	Date	Event
1901	3 November	Battle of Holy Apostles Monastery.
1904		1904 Sasun uprising.
1905		Armenian–Tatar massacres.
1905		Attempted assassination of Abdul Hamid II.
1907	27 May	Battle of Sulukh.
1909		Adana massacre: An estimated 15,000–30,000 are killed.
1915		Armenian genocide: An estimated 1,500,000 are killed. (to 1923)
1918	3 March	The Treaty of Brest-Litovsk gives Kars, Ardahan and Batum regions to the Ottoman Empire.
1918	22 May	Battle of Sardarapat
1918	23 May	Battle of Abaran
1918	25 May	Battle of Karakilisa
1918	28 May	The Armenian Congress of Eastern Armenians declares the first Republic of Armenia.
1918	4 June	Treaty of Batum
1918	30 October	Armistice of Mudros, the Ottoman Empire agreeing to leave the Transcaucasus. The Democratic Republic of Armenia assumes control of Western Armenia, now that the Ottomans are forced to leave.
1920	10 May	May Uprising ( failed coup d'état by the Armenian Bolsheviks).
1920	24 September	Turkish–Armenian War.
1920	24 September	Red Army invasion of Armenia.
1920	2 December	Soviet-aligned Armenian SSR established (distinct from and opponent of the first Republic of Armenia).
1920	6 December	Fall of the first Republic of Armenia, fully occupied by the Turkish National Movement and the Red Army (Soviet Union).

=== Soviet era ===
Year	Date	Event
1921	13 February	February Uprising
1922	30 December	Establishment of the Soviet Union; Armenian SSR joins the USSR as part of the Transcaucasian SFSR.
1923	7 July	The Nagorno-Karabakh Autonomous Oblast (NKAO) is established, granting Armenian autonomy for Nagorno-Karabakh within the Azerbaijan SSR.
1936–1938		Great Purge in Armenia
1936	5 December	Transcaucasian SFSR disestablished; Armenian SSR becomes a full union republic.
1954	11 March	Anastas Mikoyan calls for the rehabilitation of the poet Yeghishe Charents in Yerevan, beginning the Khrushchev Thaw and de-Stalinization in Armenia.
1965	24 April	1965 Yerevan demonstrations
1988	20 February	First Nagorno-Karabakh War commences.
1988	22 February	Askeran clashes.
1988	27 February	Sumgait Pogrom, marked by widespread killings, injuries, and destruction, intensifying the Nagorno-Karabakh conflict.
1988	March	Gugark pogrom.
1988	27 November	Kirovabad pogrom.
1988	7 December	Spitak earthquake.
1990	12 January	Baku pogrom.

=== Independence; last decade of the 20th century ===
Year	Date	Event
1991	30 April	Operation Ring.
1991	21 September	Armenian independence referendum
1991	17 October	First-ever Armenian presidential election, Levon Ter-Petrosyan elected president with overwhelming popular support.
1991	21 December	Armenia joins the Commonwealth of Independent States
1992	17 February	Capture of Garadaghly.
1992	26 February	Khojaly massacre.
1992	2 March	Armenia joined the United Nations.
1992	10 April	Maraga massacre.
1992	9 May	Victory in the Battle of Shushi.
1992	9 May	The Siege of Stepanakert ended after prolonged conflict during the First Nagorno-Karabakh War, marking a turning point in the struggle for Nagorno-Karabakh.
1992	1 October	Battle of Lachin.
1992	12 June	Operation Goranboy.
1992	25 June	Armenia joins the Organization of the Black Sea Economic Cooperation
1992	27 June	Mardakert and Martuni Offensives.
1993	27 March	Battle of Kalbajar.
1993	12 June	Battle of Aghdam.
1993	4 July	1993 Summer Offensives.
1993		Operation Horadiz.
1993	15 December	Operation Kalbajar.
1994	12 May	First Nagorno-Karabakh War formally ends
1995	5 July	Armenian constitutional referendum
1999	1 July	EU-Armenia Partnership and Cooperation Agreement enters into force
1999	27 October	Armenian parliament shooting

== 21st century ==
Year	Date	Event
2001	25 January	Armenia's accession to the Council of Europe
2001	28 November	Armenia becomes a permanent observer member of the Organization of American States
2004	12 April	Robert Kocharyan's government dispersed massive, peaceful protest using excessive force
2008	19 February	2008 Armenian presidential election
2012	6 May	2012 Armenian parliamentary election
2013	18 February	2013 Armenian presidential election
2015	2 January	Armenia's accession to the Eurasian Union
2015	12 January	2015 Gyumri massacre
2016	1–5 April	2016 Nagorno-Karabakh clashes
2017	2 April	2017 Armenian parliamentary election
2017	24 November	The Armenia-EU Comprehensive and Enhanced Partnership Agreement is ratified in Brussels
2018	2 March	2018 Armenian presidential election
2018	8 May	2018 Armenian Velvet Revolution
2018	9 December	2018 Armenian parliamentary election
2020	27 September	Second Nagorno-Karabakh War commences
2020	10 November	2020 Nagorno-Karabakh War formally ends
2021	20 June	2021 Armenian parliamentary election
2022	24 June	Armenia joins the European Political Community
2023	23 January	European Union Mission in Armenia began operations
2023	November	Armenia joins the International Solar Alliance
2024	12 March	The European Parliament passed a resolution confirming Armenia meets Maastricht Treaty Article 49 requirements and that the country may apply for EU membership.
2024	12 June	Armenia joins the Artemis Accords
2025	14 January	Armenia and the United States sign the Armenia–United States Strategic Partnership Charter in Washington, D.C.
2025	12 February	Armenian parliament officially passed a bill calling for the start of the process of Armenia's accession to the European Union

== See also ==
- Timeline of modern Armenian history
- Timeline of Yerevan
- Timeline of Artsakh history
