= 0s BC =

Last 9 years of the BC era

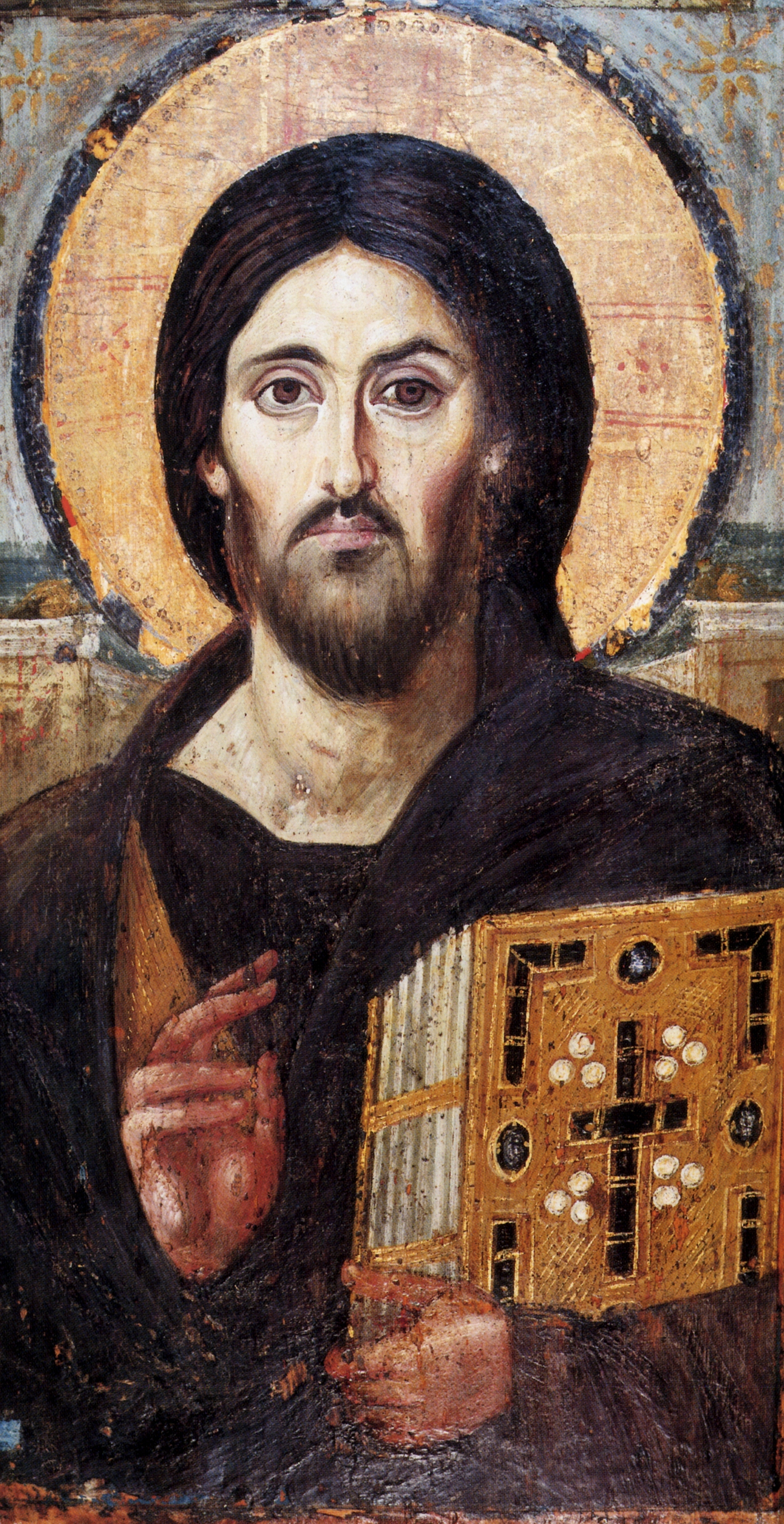
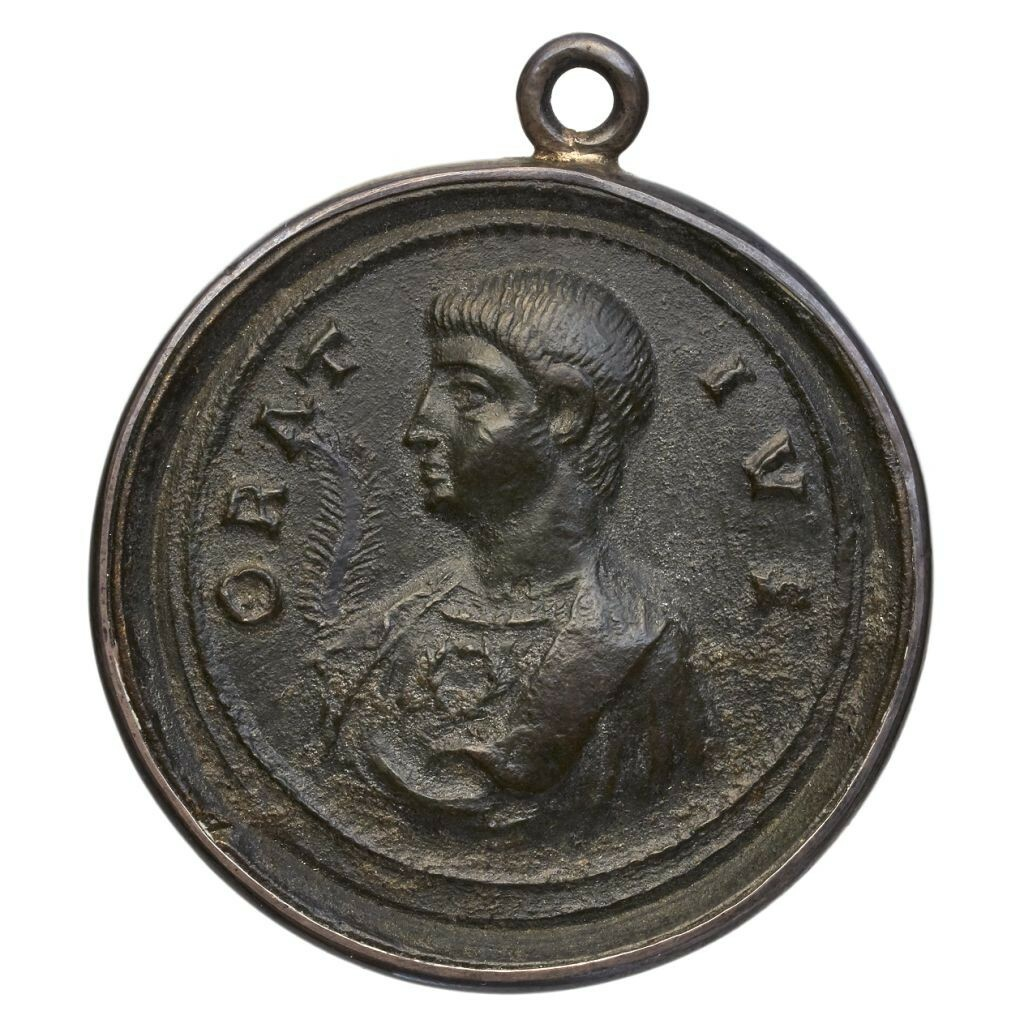
Clockwise from upper left: Jesus is generally considered to be born this decade. Historians usually consider his birth to be between 7 BC and 4 BC; Herod the Great dies in 4 BC, and the Kingdom of Judea is split; Horace and Maecenas die in 8 BC, marking the end of the Golden Age of Latin Literature; Drusus's campaigns in Germania end after he falls from a horse and dies.

The 0s BC is the period between 9 BC and 1 BC, the last nine years of the before Christ era. It is one of two "0-to-9" decade-like timespans that contain nine years, along with the 0s.

This is a list of events that occurred during the 0s BC, ordered chronologically.

== Events ==
=== 9 BC ===
==== Roman Empire ====
- January 30 – The Ara Pacis ("Altar of Augustan Peace"), which was voted for by the Senate four years earlier, is dedicated.
- Pannonia is incorporated into the Roman Empire as a part of Illyria.
- Nero Claudius Drusus, Emperor Augustus' stepson, begins a campaign against the Marcomanni, but dies soon after, due to a fall from his horse.

==== Arabia ====
- Aretas IV Philopatris ascended to become the King of the Nabataeans (modern Jordan).

=== 8 BC ===
==== Roman Empire ====
- King Maroboduus becomes ruler of the Marcomanni and fights against the Roman Empire's expansion in Bohemia.

==== India ====
- Strato II, the last Indo-Greek king, rules the eastern Punjab alongside his co-regent son Strato III (r. c. 25 BC – AD 10)

==== Germania ====
- Arminius, son of a Cheruscan chieftain, is taken as a hostage to Rome, where he receives a military education.
- After 20 years, Emperor Augustus initiates his second census of the Roman Empire.
- Sextilis, the eighth month of the early Julian calendar, is renamed Augustus (August) by a decree of the Roman Senate in honor of Augustus.

=== 7 BC ===
==== Han China ====
- May 7 – Emperor Ai becomes the emperor of Han China.

==== Roman Empire ====
- Augustus' second census of the Roman Empire reports a total of 4,233,000 citizens. However, the specific criteria of the census are still not clear.
- The city of Rome is divided into 14 administrative regions.

==== Astronomy ====
- Appearance of a very bright triple conjunction of the royal star Jupiter and Saturn in the sign of Pisces (land in the west) in May until December of that year since 854 years, with a retrogradation and stationing on November 12. Robert A. Powell (1996) proposes that this is the birth date of Jesus.

=== 6 BC ===
==== Roman Empire ====
- Tiberius retires to Rhodes, to the inconvenience of Emperor Augustus. He is recalled to Rome years later in AD 4, becoming Augustus' adopted son and heir following the deaths of Lucius and Gaius Caesar.

=== 5 BC ===
==== Astronomy ====
- March – Probable nova in the constellation Aquila.
- c. December – Probable supernova in the constellation Capricornus.

=== 4 BC ===
==== Roman Empire ====
- Herod the Great dies, which causes unrest in his client kingdom of Judea. His son, Herod Archelaus, becomes the new ruler. Herod Antipas becomes tetrarch of Galilee and Perea,and the governor of Syria, Publius Quinctilius Varus, marches down to Jerusalem from Antioch to restore order; around 3000 Jews are crucified.

==== Korea ====
- Namhae becomes king of the Korean kingdom of Silla.

=== 3 BC ===
==== Han China ====
- A drought strikes Shandong.

==== Roman Empire ====
- The Pont Julien was constructed in modern southern France.

=== 2 BC ===
==== Roman Empire ====
- February 5 – Augustus is proclaimed pater patriae ("father of the country") by the Roman Senate. This bestowed title is the logical consequence and final proof of Augustus' supreme position as princeps, the first in charge over the Roman state.
- Julia the Elder, a daughter of Augustus, is exiled on charges of treason and adultery to Pandateria; her mother Scribonia accompanies her.
- The Forum Augustum is dedicated.

==== Parthia ====
- Phraates V and his mother Musa become rulers of the Parthian Empire following the murder of Phraates IV.

==== Armenia ====
- Tigranes IV and Erato are restored to the throne after deposing Artavasdes III.

=== 1 BC ===
==== Han dynasty ====
- August 15 – Emperor Ai dies and is succeeded by his 8-year-old cousin Ping, who is enthroned on October 17. Wang Mang is appointed regent by Empress Dowager Wang Zhengjun, his aunt.
- Former regent Dong Xian, who was previously Ai's lover, commits suicide with his wife.

==== Roman Empire ====
- Gaius Caesar marries Livilla, (daughter of Antonia Minor and Nero Claudius Drusus) in an effort to gain prestige.
- The Roman theatre in Cartagena, which was built by Gaius and Lucius Caesar, finishes construction.
- Aulus Caecina Severus was appointed consul by Emperor Augustus, succeeding Cossus Cornelius Lentulus Gaetulicus and Lucius Calpurnius Piso.

==== India ====
- In the Satavahana dynasty, Kunatala Satakarni is succeeded by Satakarni II.
- Zeionises, an Indo-Scythian satrap, begins his rule in the northern Indian subcontinent (r. c. 10 BC – AD 10).

=== Year unknown ===
==== Kingdom of Kush ====
- c. 1 BC: Natakamani succeeds Amanishakheto as the King of Kush.

==== Roman Empire ====
- c. 9 BC: Livy completes compilation of his Ab Urbe Condita Libri, 142 books covering the history of Rome since its foundation to the present.
- c. 2 BC: The Aqua Alsietina (or Aqua Augusta), which was a Roman aqueduct in Rome, is constructed during the reign of Augustus.

== Births ==
=== 9 BC ===
- Ping, Chinese emperor of the Han dynasty (d. AD 6)
- Quintus Asconius Pedianus, Roman historian (d. AD 76)

=== 8 BC ===
- Wang, Chinese empress of the Han dynasty (d. AD 23)

=== 5 BC ===
- January 15 – Guang Wu, Chinese emperor of the Han Dynasty (d. AD 57)
- Aemilia Lepida, Roman noblewoman and fiancée of Claudius (d. AD 43)
- Domitia Lepida, daughter of Lucius Domitius Ahenobarbus and Antonia Major (d. AD 54)
- Lucius Vitellius the Elder, Roman consul and governor of Syria (d. AD 51)
- John the Baptist (d. c. AD 30)

=== 4 BC ===
- Approximate date – Seneca the Younger, Córdoban-born Roman Stoic philosopher, statesman and dramatist (d. AD 65)

=== 3 BC ===
- December 24 – Servius Sulpicius Galba, Roman emperor in AD 69.

=== 2 BC ===
- Gnaeus Domitius Ahenobarbus, father of Nero

=== Year unknown ===
- Jesus, first-century Jewish religious leader and founder of Christianity (d. AD 33). Modern estimates are usually between 7–4 BC Dionysius Exiguus assigned the date 1 BC in his Anno Domini; Tertullian, Eusebius and Epiphanius date it to approximately 2 BC.

== Deaths ==
=== 9 BC ===
- Nero Claudius Drusus, son of Livia and stepson of Augustus (b. 38 BC)

=== 8 BC ===
- November 27 – Horace, Roman lyric poet and writer (b. 65 BC)
- Gaius Maecenas, Roman politician and advisor (b. 70 BC)
- Polemon I, Roman client king of the Bosporan Kingdom
- Xu, Chinese empress of the Han dynasty

=== 7 BC ===
- April 17 – Cheng, Chinese emperor of the Han dynasty (b. 51 BC)
- Aristobulus IV, Jewish prince of Judea (b. 31 BC)
- Geumwa of Dongbuyeo, Korean king
- Zhao Hede, Chinese consort of the Han dynasty

=== 6 BC ===
- Lady Ban (or Ban Jieyu), Chinese concubine and poet (b. 48 BC)
- Feng Yuan (or Zhaoyi), Chinese concubine of the Han Dynasty
- Liu Xiang, Chinese scholar, editor of Shan Hai Jing and compiler of Lienü zhuan, father of Liu Xin (b. 77 BC)
- Soseono, Korean queen of Goguryeo (b. 67 BC)

=== 5 BC ===
- Acme (enslaved woman), Jewish slave and personal maid in the service of the Empress Livia Drusilla, wife of Augustus
- Curia, Roman noblewoman and wife of Quintus Lucretius Vespillo

=== 4 BC ===
- March or April – Herod the Great, king of Judea (b. 73 BC); some authors date his death to 1 BC (see Date of Herod's death).
- Antipater, Jewish heir and son of Herod the Great
- Malthace, Jewish woman and wife of Herod the Great
- Marcus Porcius Latro, Roman rhetorician
- Marcus Tullius Tiro, Roman writer, freedman of Cicero

=== 2 BC ===
- Fu, Chinese Grand Empress of the Han dynasty
- Iullus Antonius, Roman consul and son of Mark Antony (b. 43 BC)
- Phraates IV, king of the Parthian Empire

=== 1 BC ===
- August 15 – Ai of Han, Chinese emperor of the Han dynasty (b. 27 BC)
- Dong Xian, Chinese politician and commander-in-chief (b. 23 BC)
- Xiaoai, Chinese empress and wife of Ai of Han
- Zhao Feiyan, Chinese empress and wife of Cheng of Han (b. 45 BC)

=== Year unknown ===
- Cleopatra Selene II, Ptolemaic princess of Egypt
- Dionysius of Halicarnassus, Greek historian
- Fu, Chinese grand empress of the Han Dynasty

== Significant people ==
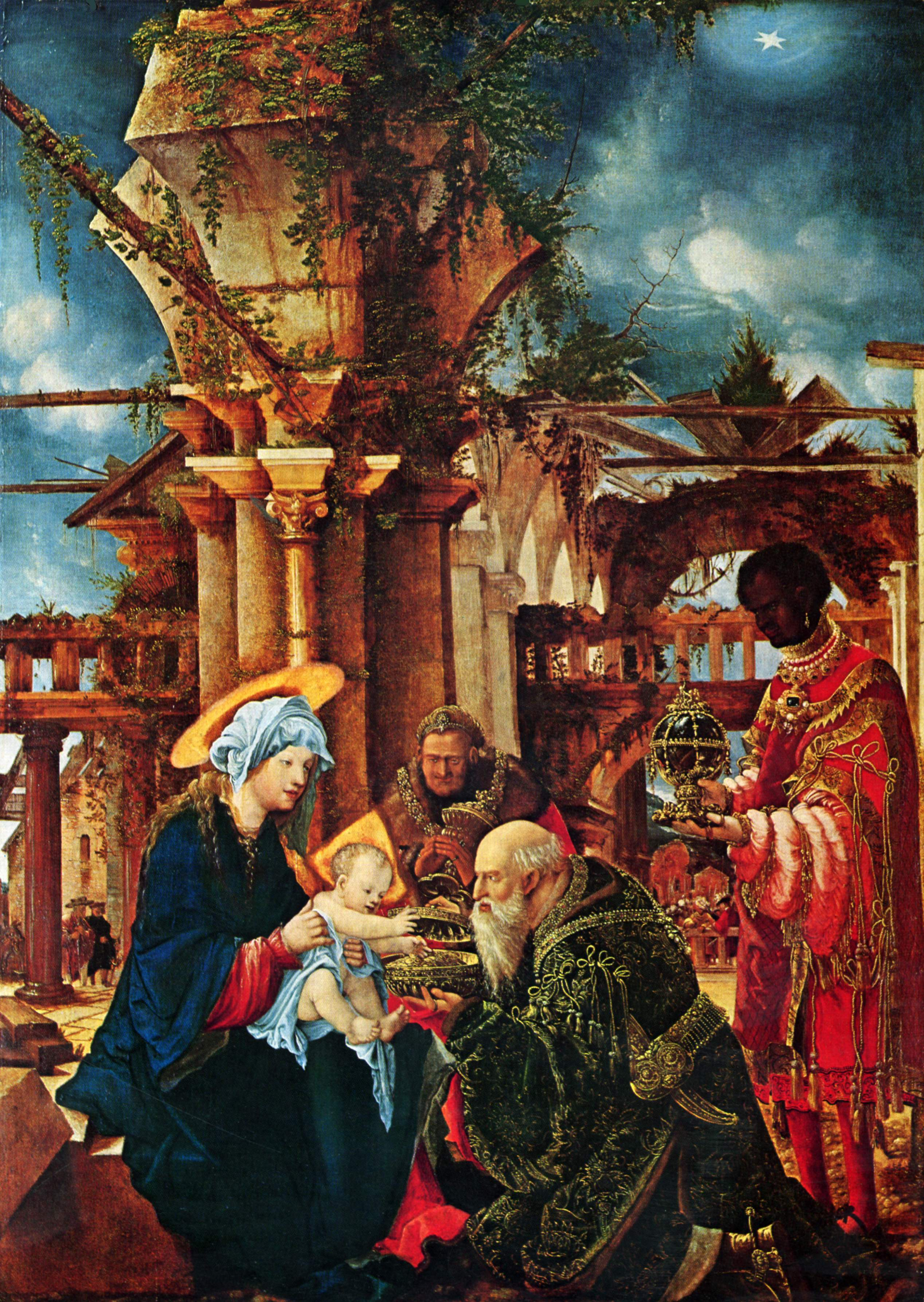
Albrecht Altdorfer's painting the Adoration of the Magi (made c. 1530) is one of several works of art concerning the Nativity of Jesus. Though Jesus's exact birthdate is unknown (other than it would have occurred sometime during this decade)

- Tigranes IV, King of Armenia, r. 12–1 BC
- Erato, Queen of Armenia, 8–5 BC, 2 BC – AD 2, AD 6–11
- Artavasdes III, King of Armenia, r. 5–2 BC
- Jesus Christ, Jewish preacher and central figure of Christianity, (c. 4 BC – c. AD 33)
- Ariobarzan of Atropatene, Client King of Armenia, r. 1 BC – AD 2
- Cheng Di, Emperor of Han dynasty China, r. 32–7 BC
- Ai Di, Emperor of Han dynasty China, r. 7–1 BC
- Ping Di, Emperor of Han dynasty China, r. 1 BC – AD 5
- Wang Mang, Chinese statesman and future emperor of China
- Dong Xian, Han dynasty Chinese official under Emperor Ai of Han
- Antiochus III, King of Commagene, r. 12 BC – AD 17
- Arminius, Germanic war chief (18/17 BC – AD 21)
- Arshak II, King of Caucasian Iberia, r. 20 BC – AD 1
- Strato II and Strato III, co-kings of the Indo-Greek Kingdom, r. 25 BC – AD 10
- Kunatala Satakarni, king of the Satavahana dynasty, r. 9–1 BC
- Satakarni III, king of the Satavahana dynasty, r. 1 BC – AD 1
- Zeionises, Indo-Scythian satrap in the northern Indian subcontinent, r. c. 10 BC – AD 10
- Lugaid Riab nDerg, legendary High King of Ireland, r. 33–9 BC
- Conchobar Abradruad, legendary High King of Ireland, r. 9–8 BC
- Crimthann Nia Náir, legendary High King of Ireland, r. (8 BC – AD 9)
- Suinin, legendary Emperor of Japan, r. 29 BC – AD 70
- Amanishakheto, King of Kush, r. 10–1 BC
- Natakamani, King of Kush, r. 1 BC – AD 20
- Ma'nu III, King of Osroene, r. 23–4 BC
- Abgar V, King of Osroene, r. 4 BC – AD 7, AD 13–50
- Phraates IV, king of the Parthian Empire, r. 38–2 BC
- Phraates V, king of the Parthian Empire, r. 2 BC – AD 4
- Musa of Parthia, mother and co-ruler with Phraates V, r. 2 BC – AD 4
- Caesar Augustus, Roman Emperor (27 BC – AD 14)
- Nero Claudius Drusus, Roman Consul, in office 9 BC
- Gaius Caesar, Roman general
- Livy, Roman historian
- Ovid, Roman poet
- Quirinius, Roman nobleman and politician
- Tiberius, Roman general, statesman, and future emperor.
- Herod the Great, client king of Judea
- Hillel the Elder, Jewish scholar and Nasi of the Sanhedrin, in office c. 31 BC – AD 9
- Shammai, Jewish scholar and Av Beit Din of the Sanhedrin, in office 20 BC – AD 20
- Hyeokgeose, King of Silla, r. 57 BC – AD 4
