= Artaxiad dynasty =

Ruling dynasty of ancient Armenia from 189 BC to 12 AD

- Parent house: Orontid dynasty
- Country: Armenia; Syria; Cilicia; Albania; Iberia
- Founded: 190 BC
- Founder: Artaxias I
- Current head: Extinct
- Final ruler: Erato I
- Titles: King of Greater Armenia; King of Sophene; King of Osroene; King of Kommagene; King of Gordyene; King of Iberia; King of Albania; King of Atropatene; King of Adiabene; King of Phoenicia; King of Syria; King of Cilicia; King of Cappadocia; King of Judea
- Dissolution: 12 AD
- Cadet branches: Royal Family of Commagene Artaxiad dynasty of Iberia

The Artaxiad dynasty (also Artashesian) (Note: "...the grand city founded by Tigranes or Metsn Tigran (the Great), the first-century B.C. scion of the Artaxiad/Artasheshian dynasty.") ruled the Kingdom of Armenia from 189 BC until their overthrow by the Romans in 12 AD. It was founded by Artaxias I, who claimed kinship with the previous ruling dynasty of Armenia, the Orontids. Their realm included Greater Armenia, Sophene and, intermittently, parts of Mesopotamia. Their main enemies were the Romans, the Seleucids and the Parthians, against whom the Armenians conducted multiple wars. Under the Artaxiad king Tigranes the Great (r. 95–55 BC), the Kingdom of Armenia reached its greatest territorial extent, extending for a brief period from the Caspian to the Mediterranean Sea.

== Origin ==
According to the Greek geographer Strabo (Geography, book 11, chapter 14), Artaxias and Zariadres were two generals (strategoi) of the Seleucid Empire who were granted control over the provinces of Greater Armenia and Sophene by the Seleucid ruler Antiochus III the Great. The last ruler of Armenia before Artaxias and Zariadres was named Orontes. The Orontid (or Eruandid) dynasty was of Iranian origin (Note: Garsoïan writes, "Tigran (Tigranes) II was the most distinguished member of the so-called Artašēsid/Artaxiad dynasty, which has now been identified as a branch of the earlier Eruandid dynasty of Iranian origin attested as ruling in Armenia from at least the 5th century B.C.E.") and had ruled Armenia since at least 400 BC. According to David Marshall Lang, it was in 200 BC that Artaxias, incited by Antiochus, overthrew Orontes and took power in Greater Armenia. Movses Khorenatsi, an Armenian historian writing in the 5th century AD or later, records a story about the conflict between King Orontes (Eruand) and Artaxias (Artashes), ending in Orontes' death and Artaxias' ascension of the Armenian throne. This appears to agree with Strabo's information about the last ruler of Armenia before Artaxias being named Orontes, and with a Greek inscription discovered in the Orontid capital of Armavir which refers to the death in battle of a ruler connected with Armenia.

After the defeat of the Seleucids by the Romans at the Battle of Magnesia in 190 BC, Artaxias and Zariadres made themselves autonomous kings. They were recognized as such by the Roman Senate according to the Treaty of Apamea in 188 BC. Artaxias' descendants ruled Armenia until the 1st century AD. Scholars believe that Artaxias and Zariadres were not foreign generals, but local figures related to the previous Orontid dynasty. Evidence for this includes Artaxias' and Zariadres' Irano-Armenian (and not Greek) names, as well as inscriptions on boundary stones from Artaxias' time in which he calls himself an Orontid. According to historian Nina Garsoïan, Artaxias and Zariadres likely belonged to different branches of the Orontid dynasty than the previous kings of Armenia. Cyril Toumanoff writes that Artaxias was "to all appearances, a local dynast" and that his claim to Orontid descent was aimed at legitimizing his rule, although he may have been matrilineally descended from the Orontids. (Note: This view is shared by Gagik Sargsyan, who also states that Artaxias likely came from the nobility of the regions of Armenia bordering Atropatene.) Matthew P. Canepa considers the Artaxiad Iranian dynasts.

== Hellenistic influences ==
Though Greater Armenia had only been superficially affected by the conquests of Alexander the Great, the country began to be influenced by the Hellenistic world under the Orontids in the 3rd century and this process reached its peak under the Artaxiads, particularly King Tigranes the Great. During this time, the Armenian rulers incorporated many Greek elements. This is shown by the contemporary Armenian coins (which had first appeared under the Orontids). They followed Greek models and have inscriptions in the Greek language. Some coins describe the Armenian kings as "Philhellenes" ("lovers of Greek culture"). Tigranes the Great and Artavasdes II both minted coins with Greek inscriptions.

Knowledge of Greek in Armenia is also evidenced by surviving parchments and rock inscriptions. Cleopatra, the wife of Tigranes the Great, invited Greeks such as the rhetor Amphicrates and the historian Metrodorus of Scepsis to the Armenian court, and – according to Plutarch – when the Roman general Lucullus seized the Armenian capital Tigranocerta, he found a troupe of Greek actors who had arrived to perform plays for Tigranes. Tigranes' successor Artavasdes II even composed Greek tragedies himself. Nevertheless, Armenian culture still retained a strong Iranian element, particularly in religious matters.

== Art and architecture ==
Artaxias built boundary stones (stelae), reminiscent of Achaemenid models, around Lake Sevan to demarcate landholdings. The boundary stones, covered in Aramaic script as a claim to royal power, indicate an Achaemenid crown and his "neo-Persian" kingship.

The stelae emphasize the Achaemenid dynastic roots of Artaxias' name. Some words such as "QTRbr", which could reflect the Middle Persian *tāgabar, 'diadem-bearer', 'king', comparatively appears in Old Armenian for 'king' (t’agavor) indicating the Persian origins of Armenian royal culture.

== Numismatics ==
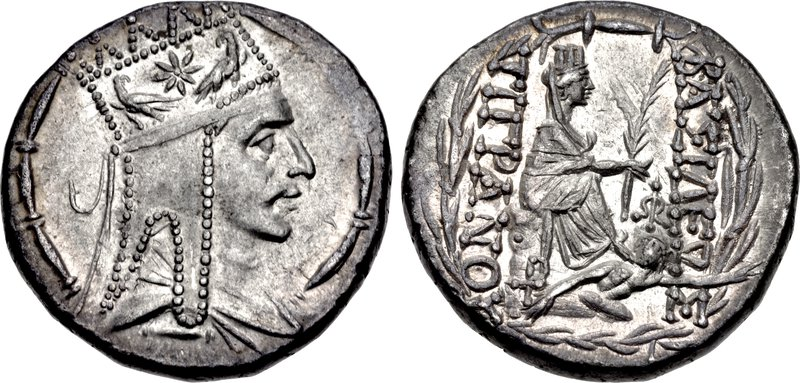
Coin of Tigranes the Great

Almost all of the Artaxiad kings minted coins, whereas only a few coins have been attributed to their predecessors, the Orontids. Despite the fact that Artaxias built boundary steles with inscriptions in the Aramaic alphabet, the Artaxiad dynasty's coinage are entirely in Greek. A copper Artaxias I coin on the reverse shows an eagle facing left and perched atop a mountain. Later coins also have the eagle alone; which may symbolize divinity or the king's power. Tigran I's copper coin, on the reverse, depicts a man sitting on a throne to the left, his left hand resting on a sceptre. Tigran II and Tigran IV both minted copper coins with the figure of Hercules.

The coins of Tigran II's predecessors bore the Greek title Basileos megalou (great king). Tigran II, however, used the term Basileus basileon (king of kings) on coins minted in Artaxata, Nisibis, and Tigranocerta, even after his re-installment by Pompey as a client-king of Rome.

== Religion ==
As historian James R. Russell states, "It was only natural that the Artaxiad monarchs should declare themselves philhellenes, yet it must not be thought that their religious beliefs ceased to be what they had been of old: staunchly Zoroastrian." David Marshall Lang adds that the Hellenistic religion and the pantheon of the Classical divinities had undoubtedly become popular amongst the upper classes in the later Artaxiad period.

== Armenian empire ==
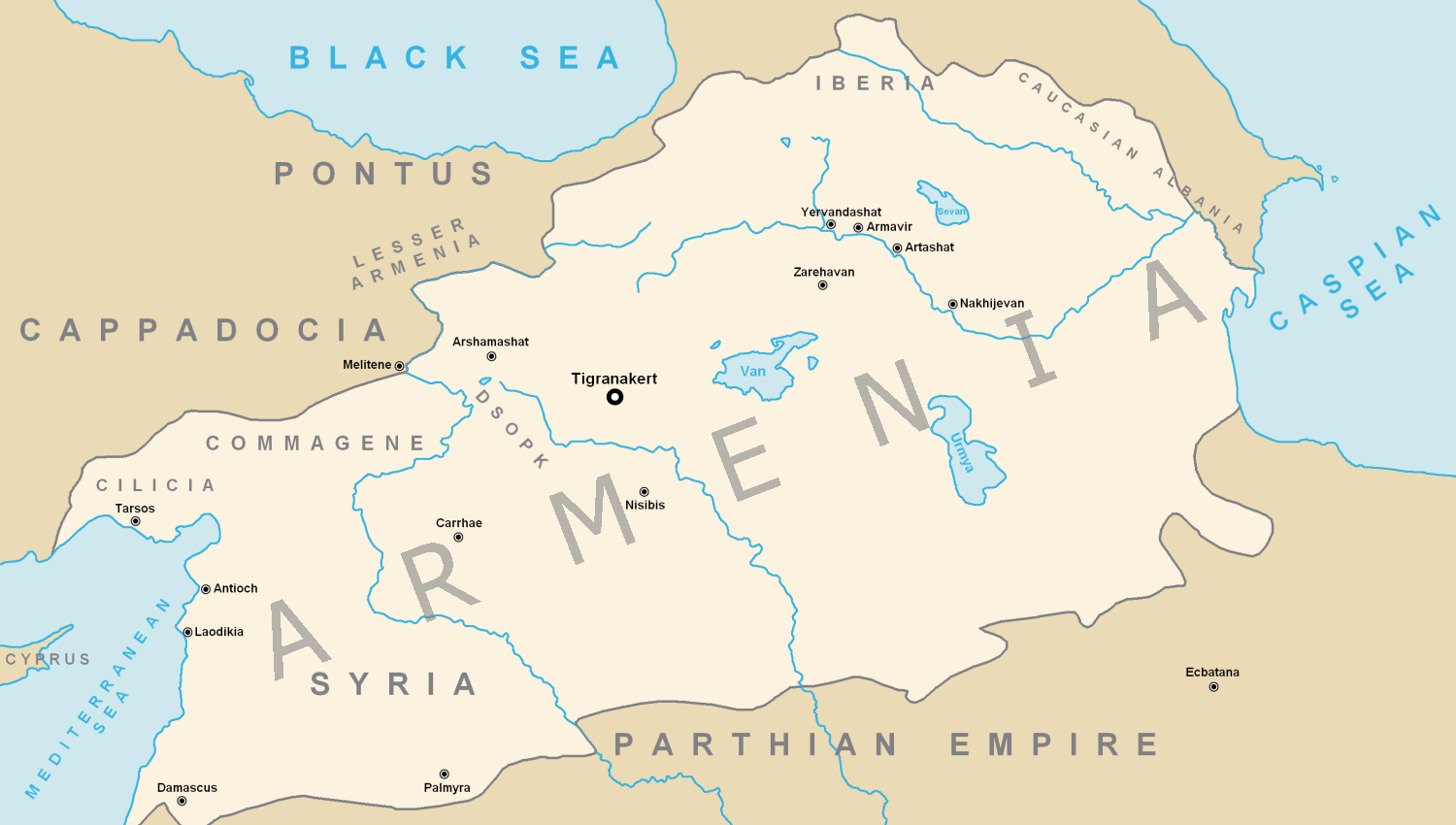
The Armenian empire under Tigranes the Great

During the reign of Tigranes the Great (95–55 BC), the kingdom of Armenia was at the zenith of its power and briefly became the most powerful state to the east of the Roman Republic. Artaxias and his followers had already constructed the base upon which Tigranes built his empire. Despite this fact, the territory of Armenia, being a mountainous one, was governed by nakharars who were largely autonomous from the central authority. Tigranes unified them in order to create internal security in the kingdom. The borders of Armenia stretched from the Caspian Sea to the Mediterranean Sea. At that time, the Armenian territories had become so expansive, that the Romans and Parthians had to join forces in order to beat them. Tigranes founded a more central capital within his domain and named it Tigranocerta.

Large territories were taken from the Parthians, who were forced to sign a treaty of friendship with Tigranes. Iberia, Albania, and Atropatene also lost territories. The Greeks within the Seleucid Empire offered Tigranes the Seleucid crown in 83 BC, after which the Armenian empire reached as far south as modern Acre, Israel, resulting in a conflict with the Hasmoneans.

== Decline ==
Roman involvement in Asia Minor brought Tigranes' empire to an end. Tigranes had allied himself with Rome's great enemy Mithridates VI, King of Pontus, and during the Third Mithridatic War, in 69 BC, a Roman army led by Lucullus invaded the Armenian empire and routed Tigranes outside Tigranocerta and Artaxata. (Note: "Foiled in this, Lucullus now decided on a midsummer (68 B.C.) offensive deep into Armenia, to crush his «exhausted antagonists»Mithridates and Tigranes who, anticipating such a move, had assembled another large army with a powerful cavalry force to harass his foragers. He brought them to battle north of Lake Van, somewhere on the upper Arsanias, an eastern tributary of the Euphrates, and put their army to flight (PLUT., Luc., 31, 5). Tigranes at once retreated to his capital, Artaxata.") In 66 BC, Lucullus' successor Pompey finally forced Tigranes to surrender. Pompey reduced Armenia to its former borders but allowed Tigranes to retain the throne as an ally of Rome. From now on, Armenia would become a buffer state between the two competing empires of the Romans and the Parthians.

Tigranes' heir Artavasdes II maintained the alliance with Rome, giving helpful advice to the Roman general Marcus Licinius Crassus on his campaign against the Parthians – advice which went unheeded and led to Crassus' disastrous defeat at the Battle of Carrhae. When Mark Antony became ruler of Rome's eastern provinces, he began to suspect the loyalty of Artavasdes, who had married his sister to the heir to the Parthian throne. In 35 BC, Antony invaded Armenia and sent Artavasdes into captivity in Egypt, where he was later executed. Antony installed his own six-year-old son by Cleopatra, Alexander Helios, on the throne of Armenia. Artavasdes' son Artaxias II gained help from the Parthians, seized the throne back and massacred the Roman garrisons in Armenia, but after a reign of ten years he was murdered. The kingdom broke down into a civil war between pro-Roman and pro-Parthian parties until it decisively became a Roman protectorate under the emperor Augustus. The Artaxiad dynasty petered out in chaos and it was a considerable time before the Arsacid dynasty emerged as their undisputed successors.

== Artaxiad kings of Armenia ==
Non-dynastic rulers are marked with italics. (Note: Some dates are approximate or doubtful).

- Artaxias I (190–159 BC)
- Artavasdes I
- Tigranes I
- Tigranes II the Great (95–55 BC)
- Artavasdes II (55–34 BC)
- Artaxias II (c. 30–20 BC)
- Tigranes III (20–8/6 BC)
- Tigranes IV (8–5 BC)
- Artavasdes III (5–2 BC)
- Tigranes IV with Erato (2 BC–c. 1 AD)
- Ariobarzanes (2–4 AD), non-Artaxiad Roman appointee
- Artavasdes IV (4–6 AD), non-Artaxiad Roman appointee
- Tigranes V (Note: According to Josephus, Tigranes V was an Artaxiad only by his mother's lineage.) and Erato (c. 6–12 AD)

== Genealogy of the Artaxiads ==
Genealogy of the Artaxiads as proposed by Cyril Toumanoff.

Zariadres
Artaxias I king of Armenia (188–159 BC)
Tigranes I king of Armenia (149–123 BC) or (123–95 BC)	Artavasdes I king of Armenia (159-149 or 123 BC)	Mirian I king of Iberia (159–109 BC) (Pharnavazid)
Artavasdes (II) king of Armenia? (123–95 BC)	Tigranes II king of Armenia (95–55 BC)	Guras viceroy of Mygdonia	Artaxias I king of Iberia (90–78 BC)	Unknown	Parnadjom I king of Iberia (109–90 BC)
Aryazate-Automé wife of Mithridates II king of Parthia	Zariadres	Tigranes the Young king of Sophene (65 BC)	Artavasdes II king of Armenia (55–34 BC)	Unknown wife of Mithridates I king of Media	Unknown wife of Pacorus I king of Parthia	Artoces I king of Iberia (78–63 BC)
Artaxias II king of Armenia (33–20 BC)	Tigranes III king of Armenia (20–6 BC)	Artavasdes III king of Armenia (6 BC)	Unknown requested in marriage for Alexander Helios	Unknown wife of Deiotarus I king of Galatia	Pharnavaz II king of Iberia (63–30 BC)	Unknown	Mirian II king of iberia (30–20 BC)
Tigranes IV king of Armenia (6 BC – 1 AD)	Erato; Queen of Armenia (6 BC – 1 AD) and (1 – 2 AD)	Unknown wife of Kartam of Colchis	Arshak II king of Iberia (20 BC – 1 AD)

== See also ==
- Artaxiad dynasty of Iberia

== Bibliography ==
=== Primary sources ===
- Lucius Ampelius, Liber Memoralis
- Appian, Roman History, "Syrian War" and "Mithridatic War"
- Cassius Dio, Roman History
- Faustus of Byzantium, History of the Armenians
- Movses Khorenatsi, History of the Armenians
- Plutarch, Parallel Lives, "Antoninus Pius", "Crassus" and "Lucullus"
- Strabo, Geography
- Tacitus, Annals

=== Secondary sources ===
- Canepa, Matthew P. (2020). The Iranian Expanse: Transforming Royal Identity Through Architecture, Landscape, and the Built Environment, 550 BCE–642 CE. University of California Press. ISBN 9780520964365.
- Chahin, M. (2001) [First published 1987]. The Kingdom of Armenia: A History (2nd, revised ed.). Psychology Press. ISBN 978-0700714520.
- Hovannisian, Richard G. (2004). The Armenian People From Ancient to Modern Times, Vol. I: The Dynastic Periods: From Antiquity to the Fourteenth Century (1st paperback ed.). New York: St. Martin's Press. ISBN 1-4039-6421-1.
- Hovannisian, Richard G. (2006). Armenian Tigranakert/Diarbekir and Edessa/Urfa. Mazda Publishers. ISBN 978-1568591537.
- Garsoian, Nina (2004). "Armeno-Iranian relations in the pre-Islamic period". In Yarshater, Ehsan (ed.). Encyclopædia Iranica (Online ed.). Encyclopædia Iranica Foundation.
- Garsoian, N. (2005). "Tigran II". In Yarshater, Ehsan (ed.). Encyclopædia Iranica (Online ed.). Encyclopædia Iranica Foundation.
- Grousset, René (1995) [1947]. Histoire de l'Arménie des origines à 1071 (in French). Payot. ISBN 2-228-88912-1.
- Chaumont, Marie-Louise (1976). L'Arménie entre Rome et l'Iran : I de l'avènement d'Auguste à l'avènement de Dioclétien, II, 9.1 (in French). Aufstieg und Niedergang der römischen Welt.
- Lang, David Marshall (1980). Armenia, Cradle of Civilization (3 ed.). Allen & Unwin. ISBN 978-0049560093.
- Lang, David M. (2000) [First published 1983]. "Iran, Armenia and Georgia". In Yarshater, Ehsan (ed.). The Cambridge History of Iran. Vol. 3, Part 1. Cambridge University Press. pp. 505–536. ISBN 978-0-521-20092-9.
- Movsisyan, Artak (2019). "From Petroglyphs to Alphabet. A Brief Characterization of the Writing Culture of Pre-Christian Armenia". In Avetisyan, Pavel S.; Dan, Roberto; Grekyan, Yervand H. (eds.). Over the Mountains and Far Away: Studies in Near Eastern History and Archaeology. Archeopress. pp. 359–370.
- Panossian, Razmik (2006). The Armenians: From Kings and Priests to Merchants and Commissars. New York: Columbia University Press. pp. 36. ISBN 978-0231139267.
- Russell, J. (1986). "Artaxias I". In Yarshater, Ehsan (ed.). Encyclopædia Iranica. Vol. II/6: Art in Iran I–ʿArūż (Online ed.). Encyclopædia Iranica Foundation. pp. 659–660.
- Russell, James (1987). Frye, Richard N. (ed.). Zoroastrianism in Armenia. Harvard University Press. ISBN 0-674-96850-6.
- Shayegan, M. Rahim (2018). Arsacids and Sasanians: Political Ideology in Post-Hellenistic and Late Antique Persia. Cambridge University Press. ISBN 978-1-108-45661-6.
- Stone, Michael E.; Topchyan, Aram (2022). Jews in Ancient and Medieval Armenia: First Century BCE to Fourteenth Century CE. Oxford University Press. ISBN 978-0-19-758207-7.
- Toumanoff, Cyril (1990). Les dynasties de la Caucasie chrétienne de l'Antiquité jusqu'au xixe siècle: Tables généalogiques et chronologiques (in French). Rome.
- Toumanoff, Cyril (1963). Studies in Christian Caucasian History. Washington: Georgetown University Press. OCLC 505712128.
- Wylie, Graham J. (1994). "Lucullus Daemoniac". L'Antiquité Classique. 63: 109–119. doi:10.3406/antiq.1994.1185.
- Yeremian, Suren; et al., eds. (1971). Hay zhoghovrdi patmutʻyun Հայ ժողովրդի պատմություն [History of the Armenian People] (in Armenian). Vol. 1. Yerevan: Armenian SSR Academy of Sciences.
