= 65 BC =

65 BC in various calendars
- Gregorian calendar: 65 BC; LXV BC
- Ab urbe condita: 689
- Ancient Egypt era: XXXIII dynasty, 259
- Pharaoh: Ptolemy XII Auletes, 16
- Ancient Greek Olympiad (summer): 178th Olympiad, year 4
- Assyrian calendar: 4686
- Balinese saka calendar: N/A
- Bengali calendar: −658 – −657
- Berber calendar: 886
- Buddhist calendar: 480
- Burmese calendar: −702
- Byzantine calendar: 5444–5445
- Chinese calendar: 乙卯年 (Wood Rabbit); 2633 or 2426 — to — 丙辰年 (Fire Dragon); 2634 or 2427
- Coptic calendar: −348 – −347
- Discordian calendar: 1102
- Ethiopian calendar: −72 – −71
- Hebrew calendar: 3696–3697
- Hindu calendars
- Vikram Samvat: −8 – −7
- Shaka Samvat: N/A
- Kali Yuga: 3036–3037
- Holocene calendar: 9936
- Iranian calendar: 686 BP – 685 BP
- Islamic calendar: 707 BH – 706 BH
- Javanese calendar: N/A
- Julian calendar: N/A
- Korean calendar: 2269
- Minguo calendar: 1976 before ROC 民前1976年
- Nanakshahi calendar: −1532
- Seleucid era: 247/248 AG
- Thai solar calendar: 478–479
- Tibetan calendar: ཤིང་མོ་ཡོས་ལོ་ (female Wood-Hare); 62 or −319 or −1091 — to — མེ་ཕོ་འབྲུག་ལོ་ (male Fire-Dragon); 63 or −318 or −1090

The year 65 BC was a year of the pre-Julian Roman calendar. At the time, it was known as the Year of the Consulship of Cotta and Torquatus (or, less frequently, the year 689 Ab urbe condita). The denomination 65 BC for this year has been used since the early medieval period, when the Anno Domini calendar era became the prevalent method in Europe for naming years.

== Events ==
=== By place ===
==== Roman Republic ====
- In response to the illegal exercise of citizen rights by foreigners, the Roman Senate passes the Lex Papia, which expels all foreigners from Rome
- Tigranes of Armenia is defeated and captured by Pompey, thus ending all hostilities on the northeastern frontier of Rome.
- Pompey the Great subjugates the kingdom of Iberia and makes Colchis a Roman province.

==== Western Han Empire ====
- 9th year of the reign of Emperor Xuan of Han

== Births ==
- December 8 – Horace, Roman poet (d. 8 BC)
- Gaius Asinius Pollio, Roman orator, poet and historian (d. AD 4)

== Deaths ==
- Xiphares, son of Mithridates VI (b. c. 85 BC)
