= Erato of Armenia =

Three-time ancient queen of Armenia

Erato
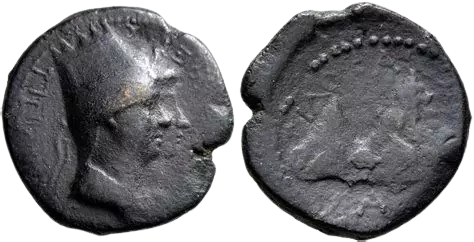
- Jugate busts of Tigranes IV, wearing five-pointed tiara, and Erato to right.

Queen of Armenia 1st co-reign with Tigranes IV
- Reign: 8–5 BC
- Predecessor: Tigranes III
- Successor: Artavasdes III

Queen of Armenia 2nd co-reign with Tigranes IV
- Reign: 2 BC–AD 1
- Predecessor: Artavasdes III
- Successor: Herself

Queen of Armenia sole reign
- Reign: 1–2 AD
- Predecessor: Tigranes IV and Herself
- Successor: Ariobarzanes II

Queen of Armenia co-reign with Tigranes V
- Reign: 6–12 AD
- Predecessor: Artavasdes IV
- Successor: Vonones I
- Spouse: Tigranes IV
- Dynasty: Artaxiad
- Father: Tigranes III

Erato (Armenian: Էրատո) was a queen of Armenia from the Artaxiad dynasty. She co-ruled as Roman client queen in 8–5 BC and 2 BC–AD 1 with her husband and brother Tigranes IV. Erato reigned alone in 1–2 AD. After living in political exile for a number of years, she co-ruled as Roman client queen from 6 until 12 with Tigranes V, her distant paternal relative and possible second husband. She may be viewed as one of the last hereditary rulers of her nation.

== Family ==
Erato was the second child and the known daughter born to Tigranes III. She had an older paternal half-brother Tigranes IV. Erato was born and raised either in Rome, where her father lived in political exile for 10 years from 30 BC until 20 BC, or during her father's kingship of Armenia from 20 BC until 10 BC.

Erato's father, Tigranes III, died before 6 BC. In 8 BC, the Armenians installed Tigranes IV as successor of Tigranes III. In accordance with Oriental or Hellenistic custom, Tigranes IV married Erato in order to preserve the purity of the Artaxiad bloodline. Erato became queen through marriage to her half-brother. Erato and Tigranes IV had a daughter who married King Pharasmanes I of Iberia (1 AD-58), with whom she had three sons, Mithridates I of Iberia, Rhadamistus, and Amazasp (known from a Greek inscription found in Rome).

== Co-rule with Tigranes IV: 8–5 BC and 2 BC–AD 1 ==
Although they were clients of the Roman Empire, Tigranes IV and Erato were both anti-Roman and not the choices of Roman emperor Augustus. Their dual rule lacked Roman approval and they leaned towards Parthia for support. Rome and Parthia competed with one another for influence over Armenia. Anti-Roman sentiment was building in Armenia during the reign of Tigranes IV and Erato, according to Festus, who emphasizes that the kingdom of Armenia was very strong during this period.

The discontent of the ruling Artaxiad monarchs and their subjects towards Rome had instigated war with the help of King Phraates V of Parthia. To avoid a full-scale war with Rome, Phraates V soon ceased his support to the Armenian monarchs. This led Tigranes IV and Erato to acknowledge Roman suzerainty and send their good wishes and submission to Rome. Augustus then allowed them to remain in power.

In 1 C.E., Tigranes IV was killed in battle, perhaps ending an internal Armenian revolt of those who were infuriated by the royal couple becoming allies to Rome.

== Sole reign: 1–2 AD ==
Erato reigned alone in 1–2 AD. In the chaos that followed, Erato abdicated and lived in political exile. The Armenians then requested from Augustus a new king. Augustus appointed Ariobarzanes of Media Atropatene as the new king of Armenia in 2 AD. Ariobarzanes through his father was a distant relative of the Artaxiad dynasty as he was a descendant of a sister of King Artavasdes II.

== Co-rule from Tigranes V: 6–12 AD ==
In the year 6, Artavasdes III, son and successor of Ariobarzanes, was murdered by his dissatisfied subjects. As the Armenians grew weary of foreign kings, Augustus revised his foreign policy and appointed the Herodian Tigranes V, possibly a great-grandson of Artavasdes II, as king.

Tigranes V was accompanied by his grandfather Archelaus of Cappadocia and the future Roman emperor Tiberius to Armenia, where he was installed as king. Artaxata became his capital. In 6, Tigranes V ruled Armenia alone. Sometime into his reign, the Armenian nobles rebelled against him and restored Erato. Wishing to cooperate with Rome, she co-ruled with Tigranes V. Their co-rule is known from numismatic evidence. They may have married. They were overthrown under unknown circumstances in 12. Augustus kept Armenia as a client kingdom and appointed Vonones I of Parthia as king. The fate of Erato afterwards is unknown and Tigranes V may have remained living in Armenia.

== Surviving evidence ==
The sources for the life of Erato are Roman historians Tacitus (1st and 2nd centuries), Cassius Dio (2nd and 3rd centuries) and Festus (4th century).

An image of Erato is found on an ancient coin currently kept at the National Library in Paris. Coinage has survived from her rule with Tigranes IV. The Greek inscription names her "Erato, sister of King Tigranes". Their other coinage features a depiction of Tigranes IV with Erato, inscribed with "great king, Tigranes". Coinage has also survived from Erato's co-rule with Tigranes V.

== Sources ==
- Adalian, R. P. (2010). Historical Dictionary of Armenia (2nd ed.). Scarecrow Press. ISBN 9780810874503. OCLC 647927779.
- Baumer, C. (2021). History of the Caucasus. Vol. 1. I.B. Tauris. ISBN 9780755639694. OCLC 1259549144.
- Bunson, M. (2014). Encyclopedia of the Roman Empire (rev. ed.). Infobase. ISBN 9781438110271.
- Ehrlich, M. A. (2009). Encyclopedia of the Jewish Diaspora: Origins, Experiences, and Culture. Vol. 1. ABC-Clio. ISBN 9781851098736. OCLC 299159850.
- Hovannisian, R. G. (2004). The Armenian People from Ancient to Modern Times. Vol. 1. St. Martin's Press. ISBN 9781403964212. OCLC 55646134.
- Kurkjian, V. M. (2008) [1958]. A History of Armenia. Indo-European Publishing. ISBN 9781604440126. OCLC 352929925.
- Naroll, R.; Bullough, V. L.; Naroll, F. (1974). Military Deterrence in History: A Pilot Cross-Historical Survey. SUNY Press. ISBN 9780873950473. OCLC 730505.
- Nercessian, Y. T. (1984). Հայ Դրամագիտական Ուսումնասիրություններ [Armenian Numismatic Bibliography and Literature] (in Armenian). Armenian Numismatic Society. ISBN 9780960684229. OCLC 12052449.
- Sayles, W. G. (1998). Ancient Coin Collecting IV: Roman Provincial Coins. Krause Publications. ISBN 9780873415521. OCLC 39396679.
- Swan, P. M. (2004). The Augustan Succession: An Historical Commentary on Cassius Dio's Roman History, Books 55-56 (9 B.C.-A.D. 14). Oxford University Press. ISBN 9781423720843. OCLC 61342089.
- Syme, R. (1995). Anatolica: Studies in Strabo. Clarendon Press. ISBN 9780198149439. OCLC 231641996.
- Temporini, H.; Haase, W. (1972). Aufstieg und Niedergang der römischen Welt: Geschichte und Kultur Roms im Spiegel der neueren Forschung [Rise and Fall of the Roman World: History and Culture of Rome Reflected in Recent Research] (in German). de Gruyter. ISBN 9783110018851. OCLC 652361552.
- Yarshater, E. (1983). The Cambridge History of Iran. Cambridge University Press. ISBN 9780521200929. OCLC 311344764.

Erato of Armenia Artaxiad dynasty
Regnal titles
Preceded by Tigranes III	Queen of Armenia; 8–5 BC and 2 BC–2 AD with Tigranes IV (8–5 BC and 2 BC–1 AD)	Succeeded by Ariobarzanes II
Preceded by Artavasdes III	Queen of Armenia; 6 - 12 with Tigranes V	Succeeded by Vonones I
