= Tigranes =

Name of a number of historical figures

Tigranes (/tɪˈɡreɪniːz/, Ancient Greek: Τιγράνης) is the Greek rendering of the Old Iranian name *Tigrāna. This was the name of a number of historical figures, primarily kings of Armenia.

The name of Tigranes, which was theophoric in nature, was uncommon during the Achaemenid era (550–330 BC). Only two historical figures are known to bear the name during that period.

By far the best known Tigranes is Tigranes the Great, king of Armenia from 95 to 55 BC, who founded a short-lived Armenian empire. His father, who ruled from 115 to 95 BC, was also named Tigranes, as were several later kings of Armenia. There is some lack of consistency in assigning dynastic numbers to these kings. The earliest Tigranes and his son are usually not included, making Tigranes I the father of Tigranes the Great.

Another Tigranes was a member of the Achaemenid family who, according to Herodotus, was a son of Artabanus who commanded the Medes in the army of Xerxes during the invasion of Greece.

The satirist Lucian, in his True History, describes Homer (probably 8th century BC) as a Babylonian called Tigranes, who assumed the name Homer when taken "hostage" (homeros) by the Greeks.

== Persons ==
- Tigranes (legendary), legendary Armenian figure
- Tigranes I ruled 115–95 BC
- Tigranes the Great, sometimes known as Tigranes II, ruled 95–55 BC
- Tigranes the Younger, son of Tigranes the Great, briefly ruled the Kingdom of Sophene, 65 BC
- Tigranes III ruled 20–8 BC
- Tigranes IV ruled 8–5 BC and 2 BC – 1 AD
- Tigranes V ruled 6–12 AD
- Tigranes VI ruled 58–61 AD
- Tigranes VII (Tiran) ruled 339 – c.350 AD

== Sources ==
- Marciak, Michał (2017). Sophene, Gordyene, and Adiabene: Three Regna Minora of Northern Mesopotamia Between East and West. BRILL. ISBN 978-9004350700.
- Shahbazi, A. Shapur (2017). Badian, Ernst (ed.). "Irano-Hellenic Notes: 1. The Three Faces of Tigranes". American Journal of Ancient History. 2 (2). De Gruyter: 124–136. doi:10.31826/9781463237547-002.
