= Artavasdes III of Armenia (5–2 BC) =

King of Armenia from 5 to 2 BC

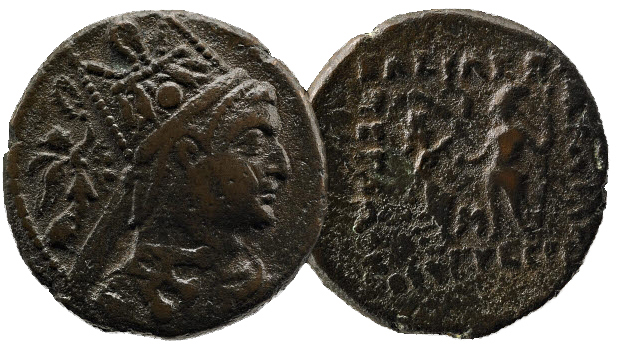
King of Armenia Artavasdes III

Artavasdes III was a king of the Kingdom of Armenia who ruled from 5 to 2 BC. He may have been a son of Artavasdes II of Armenia, thus a brother of Artaxias II and Tigranes III and an uncle of Tigranes IV. Augustus had commanded the enthronement of Artavasdes III as Armenian king, or soon after, in the effort to supplant Tigranes IV and Erato. Artavasdes was forcibly driven out, presumably by supporters of Tigranes IV backed by Parthia.
