= Alexander Helios =

Son of Egyptian Pharaoh Cleopatra VII

- Prince of Ptolemaic Egypt
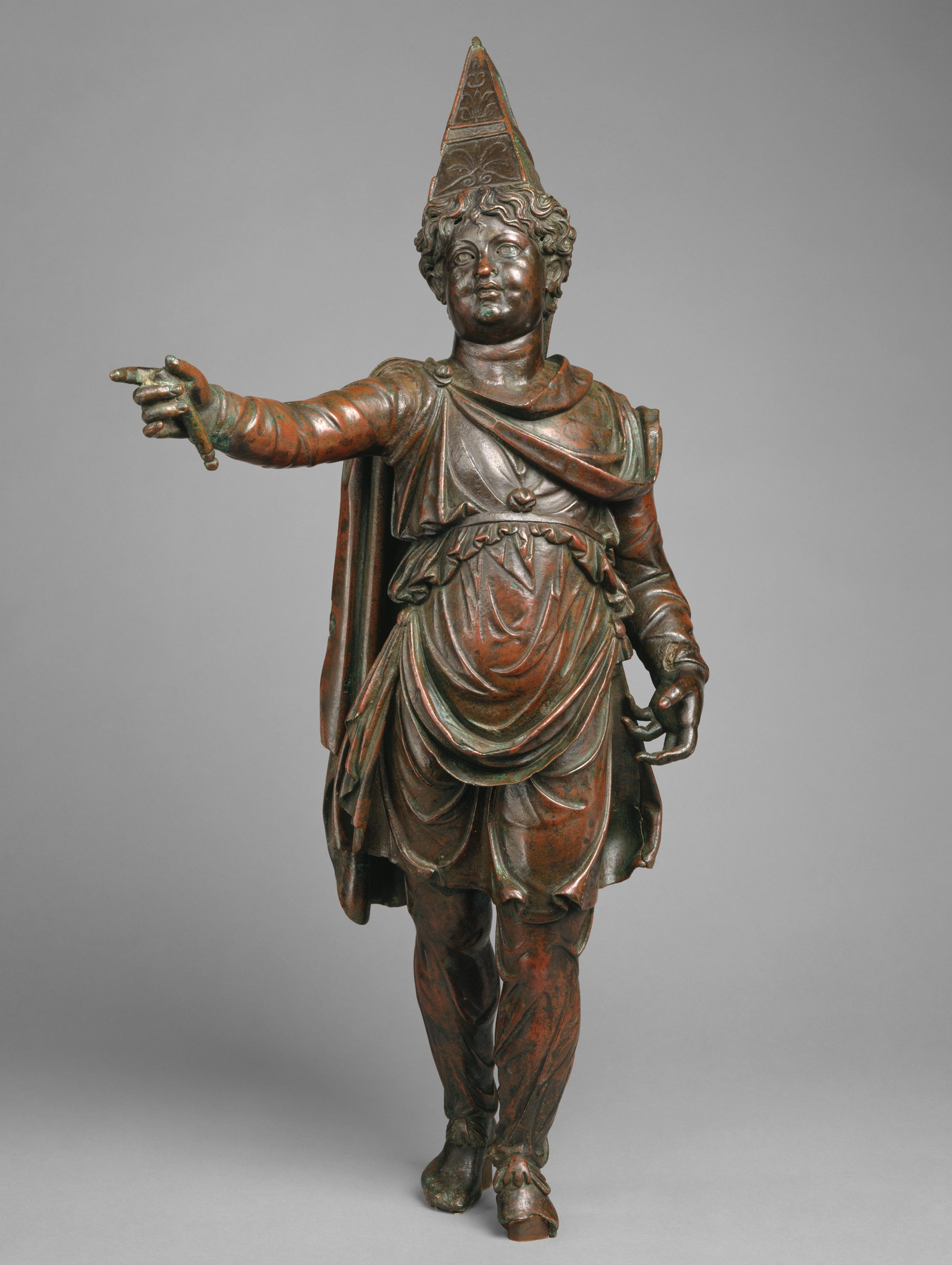
- Bronze statuette identified as Alexander Helios, mid-1st century BC, Metropolitan Museum of Art

King of Armenia
- Reign: 34–30 BC
- Coronation: 34 BC at the Donations of Alexandria
- Predecessor: Artavasdes II
- Successor: Artaxias II
- Born: c. 40 BC (presumed, exact date unknown); Alexandria, Egypt
- Died: possibly between 29 and 25 BC
- Dynasty: Ptolemaic
- Father: Mark Antony
- Mother: Cleopatra VII Philopator

Alexander Helios (Greek: Ἀλέξανδρος Ἥλιος; late 40 BC – unknown, but possibly between 29 and 25 BC) was a Ptolemaic prince and son of Pharaoh Cleopatra VII of the Ptolemaic dynasty and Roman triumvir Mark Antony. Alexander's fraternal twin sister was Cleopatra Selene II. Cleopatra named her son after Alexander the Great. His second name in Ancient Greek means "Sun"; this was the counterpart of his twin sister's second name Selene (Σελήνη), meaning "Moon".

== Life ==
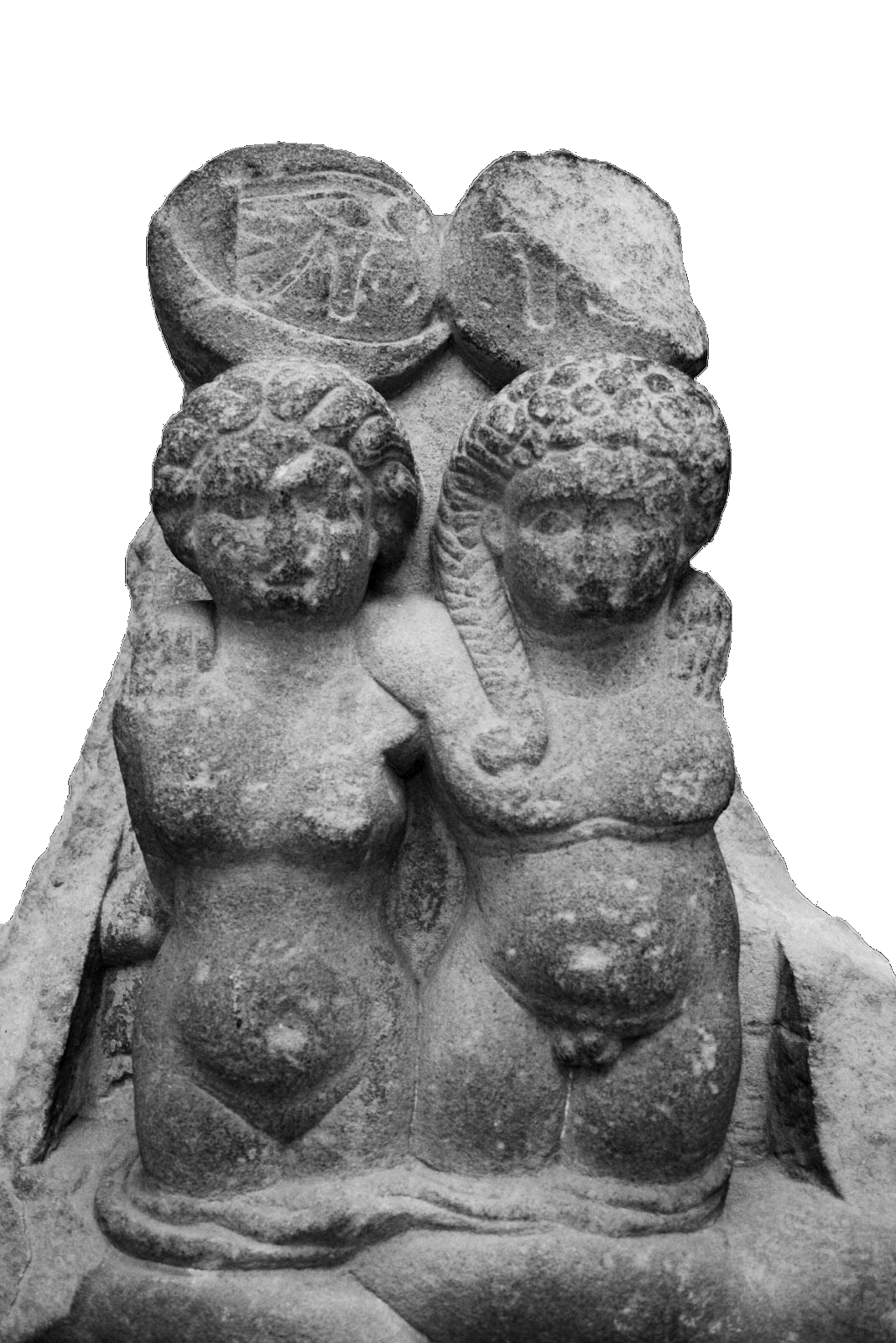
Alexander Helios with his twin sister, adorned by Egyptian and Greek cultural references, e.g. Cleopatra Selene II is crowned with a crescent Moon, referring to her namesake the lunar deity.

Alexander Helios was born and educated in Alexandria. He was the second of Cleopatra's three sons, Caesarion being the oldest. In late 34 BC, at the Donations of Alexandria, Alexander Helios, aged six, was dressed in a Median costume and was given the title King of Kings and the ruler of Armenia, Media, Parthia and any countries yet to be discovered between the Euphrates and Indus rivers, although most of this territory stood outside of their control at that time. These areas were, in fact, already ruled by Artaxias II of Armenia (who had been elected King that same year after Antony captured his father Artavasdes II), Artavasdes I of Media Atropatene and Phraates IV of Parthia. In 33 BC, Alexander was engaged to his distant relative Iotapa, a princess of Media Atropatene and daughter of Artavasdes I. However, Mark Antony and Cleopatra were defeated by Octavian at the Battle of Actium in 31 BC. The next year, they committed suicide as Octavian and his army invaded Egypt. Iotapa left Egypt to return to her father and later married her maternal cousin King Mithridates III of Commagene, who was of Armenian and Greek descent.

When Octavian conquered Egypt he spared Alexander but took him, his sister and his brother, Ptolemy Philadelphus, from Egypt to Rome. Octavian celebrated his military triumph in Rome by parading the children in heavy gold chains in the streets behind an effigy of their mother clutching an asp to her arm. It is unclear whether Ptolemy Philadelphus survived the journey to Rome, as Cassius Dio mentions the twins only in his History of Rome. Octavian gave the children to Octavia Minor, his elder sister and a former wife of Mark Antony, to be raised under her guardianship in Rome. They were generously received by Octavia, who educated them with her own children.

=== Later life ===
The fate of Alexander Helios is unknown. Plutarch, Cassius Dio and Suetonius state that Octavian killed Antony's son Marcus Antonius Antyllus and Cleopatra's son with Julius Caesar, Caesarion. The only further mention of Alexander Helios and Ptolemy Philadelphus comes from Cassius Dio, who states that when their sister, Cleopatra Selene II, married King Juba II [25 BC], Octavian (by then named Augustus) spared the lives of Alexander Helios and Ptolemy Philadelphus as a favor to the couple. After Helios arrives in Rome he disappears from historical records.

== See also ==
- List of people who disappeared

== Sources ==
- "Alexander Helios". Archived from the original on 2003-11-02.
- Cleopatra Selene II & Juba II
- Plutarch - Antony
