= Roman military standards =

Emblems in the Roman army

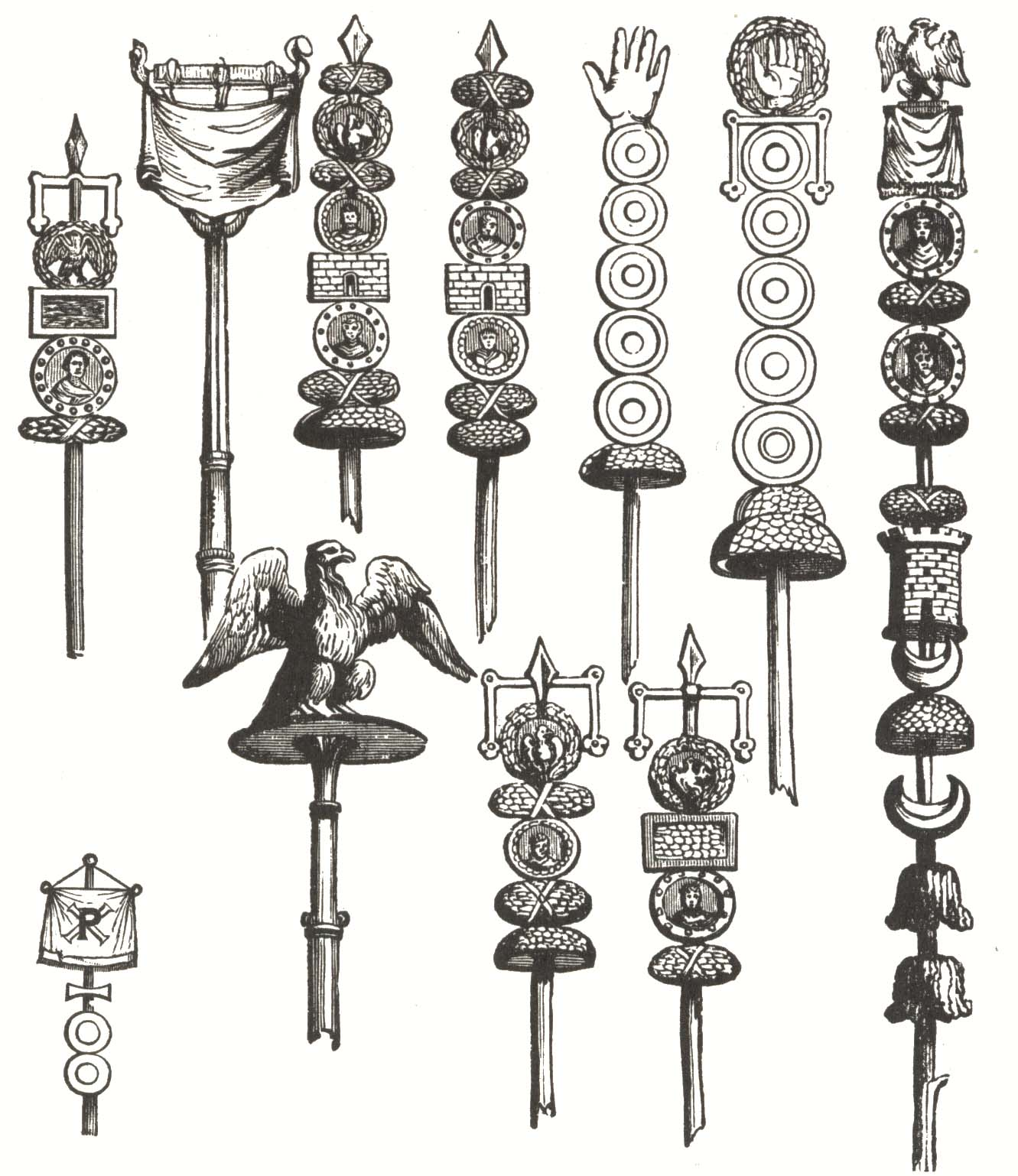
Roman standards

Roman military standards were emblems adopted by units of the Roman army. There were three main types of standard (Aquila, Vexillum, Signum). Several throughout its history include:

- Aquila, the emblem of the Roman legion whose adoption Pliny the Elder attributes to the general Gaius Marius. Each legion had an eagle, or aquila, carried by an aquilifer;
- Vexillum, the emblem of a legion, cohors, numerus or detachments of such units. This was a flag attached to the top of the pole. One type had the name and number of the legion on it. Others were used by detachments serving away from the legion;
- Draco, a cavalry standard later adopted also by infantry units;
- Labarum, personal ensign of emperor Constantine I, later adopted as army standard.
- Signum, Each century (80 men) had its own standard, called a signum. Signa had lots of symbols attached to the pole (Many were discs with indented circles).
- Imago, Standard showed the emperor.

== Sources ==
- Töpfer, Kai (2011). Signa Militaria. Die römischen Feldzeichen in der Republik und im Prinzipat. Mainz: Verlag des Römisch-Germanischen Zentralmuseums, ISBN 978-3-88467-162-7.
