= Artaxias II =

King of Armenia from 30 to 20 BC

- King of Kings
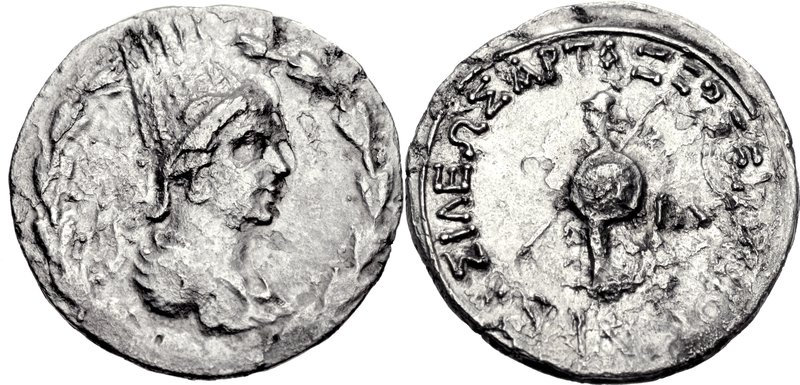
- A tetradrachm of Artaxias II

King of Armenia
- Reign: 34 (de jure) or 30 (de facto) – 20 BC
- Predecessor: Alexander Helios (de facto); Artavasdes II (de jure)
- Successor: Tigranes III
- Died: 20 BC
- Dynasty: Artaxiad
- Father: Artavasdes II
- Religion: Zoroastrianism

Artaxias II, also known as Artaxes II and Artashes (60s BC – 20 BC), was a prince of the Kingdom of Armenia, a member of the Artaxiad dynasty, and King of Armenia from 34/30 BC until 20 BC.

== Family background and early life ==
Artaxias II was the eldest son of Artavasdes II of Armenia by a mother whose name is unknown. He and was the namesake of his paternal ancestor, Artaxias I. Artaxias II had two siblings: a younger brother who would later become Tigranes III and a sister, name unknown, who possibly married King Archelaus of Cappadocia. He was born and raised in Armenia.

== Kingship ==
Artaxias II ascended to the Armenian throne in 30 BC when he regained the throne that had been lost by his father. The Roman Triumvir Mark Antony had captured Artavasdes II and his family, who were then taken as political prisoners to Alexandria, where Artavasdes II was later executed on the orders of Cleopatra VII of Egypt. Artaxias II escaped and fled to King Phraates IV of Parthia. Phraates IV invaded Armenia and placed Artaxias II on the throne. As a result, Artaxias II was pro-Parthian and anti-Roman. With the support of Phraates IV, Artaxias II led a successful military campaign against Artavasdes I of Media Atropatene, a former enemy of Artavasdes II.

Artaxias II was said to be spiteful and vengeful. He massacred the remaining Roman garrison and slaughtered all the Roman traders in Armenia. As a possible consequence of this action, when Artaxias II sent emissaries in Rome to try to secure the release of his family, then in Roman captivity, the Roman Emperor Augustus refused his request.

Artaxias II proved to be an unpopular leader with his people. As the Armenians lost faith in their monarch, they sent messengers to Augustus requesting him to remove Artaxias II from his throne and to install his brother, Tigranes III, as his successor. By 20 BC, Tigranes III had lived in Rome for 10 years. Augustus agreed to the Armenians' request and sent his step-son Tiberius, along with Tigranes III and a large army, to depose Artaxias II. Before Tiberius and Tigranes III arrived in Armenia, a cabal within the palace murdered Artaxias II. The Romans installed Tigranes III as the new king of Armenia unopposed.

== Sources ==
- R. Naroll, V.L. Bullough & F. Naroll, Military Deterrence in History: A Pilot Cross-Historical Survey, SUNY Press, 1974
- H. Temporini & W. Haase, Politische Geschichte (Provinzen Und Randv Lker: Griechischer Balkanraum; Kleinasien): Griechischer Balkanraum; Kleinasien), Walter de Gruyter, 1980
- M. Sicker, The Pre-Islamic Middle East (Google eBook), Greenwood Publishing Group, 2000
- M. Bunsen, Encyclopedia of the Roman Empire, Infobase Printing, 2009
- T. Daryaee, The Oxford Handbook of Iranian History, Oxford University Press, 2012

Artaxias II Artaxiad dynasty Born: unknown Died: 20 BC
Preceded by Artavasdes II	Prince of Armenia; 34 BC – 20 BC	Succeeded by Tigranes III
