= Tigranes IV =

King of Armenia (8–5 BC, 2 BC–1 AD)

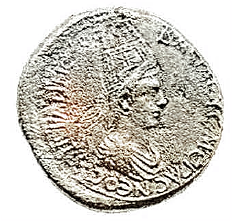
- Coin of Tigranes IV, minted during his second reign

King of Armenia 1st co-reign with Erato
- Reign: 8–5 BC
- Predecessor: Tigranes III
- Successor: Artavasdes III

King of Armenia 2nd co-reign with Erato
- Reign: 2 BC–AD 1
- Predecessor: Artavasdes III
- Successor: Erato (as sole monarch in 1–2 AD); Ariobarzanes II (as king from 2 AD)
- Born: late 1st century BC
- Died: c. 1 AD
- Spouse: Erato of Armenia
- Dynasty: Artaxiad
- Father: Tigranes III

Tigranes IV (late 1st century BC – c. 1 AD) was a prince of the Kingdom of Armenia and member of the Artaxiad dynasty who served as a Roman client king of Armenia from 8 BC until 5 BC and 2 BC until 1 AD.

== Family background and early life ==
Tigranes IV was the son born to Tigranes III by a mother whose name is unknown. His known sibling was his younger paternal half-sister Erato who was born to another woman, whose name is also unknown. Although Tigranes IV was the namesake of his father, the name Tigranes was the most common royal name in the Artaxiad dynasty and was among the most ancient names of the Armenian Kings. Tigranes IV was born and raised either in Rome where his father lived in political exile for 10 years from 30 BC until 20 BC or during his father's Kingship of Armenia in which he ruled from 20 BC until 8 BC.

== Kingship of Armenia ==
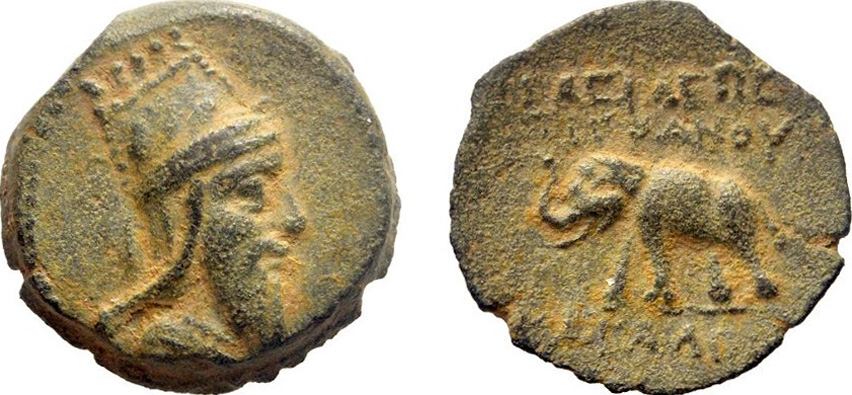
Coin of Tigranes IV, with elephant

Tigranes III died before 8 BC. In 8 BC, the Armenians installed Tigranes IV as King as the successor to his father. In accordance with Oriental custom or Hellenistic custom, Tigranes IV married his sister Erato in order to preserve the purity of the Artaxiad royal blood line. Erato through marriage to her brother, became queen and his queen consort. From their sibling union at an unknown date, Erato bore Tigranes IV a daughter, whose name is unknown, who later married King Pharasmanes I of Iberia who ruled from 1 until 58, and by whom he had three sons: Mithridates I of Iberia, Rhadamistus and Amazaspus (Amazasp) who is known from a Greek inscription found in Rome.

Although Tigranes IV and Erato were Roman client monarchs governing Armenia, they were both anti-Roman and were not the choices of the Roman emperor Augustus for the Armenian throne, as their dual rule did not have Roman approval and they leaned towards Parthia for support.

Rome and Parthia competed with one another for their protégés to have influence and govern Armenia. Roman historian of the 4th century Sextus Rufus informs us that anti-Roman sentiment was building in Armenia during the reign of Tigranes IV and Erato. Rufus also emphasizes that the Kingdom of Armenia was very strong during this period.

The dispossessed and the discontent of the ruling Artaxiad monarchs and their subjects towards ancient Rome had instigated war with the aid of King Phraates V of Parthia. To avoid a full-scale war with Rome, Phraates V soon ceased his support to the Armenian ruling monarchs. This lead Tigranes IV and Erato, acknowledging Roman suzerainty; sending their good wishes and submission to Rome. Augustus receiving their submission to Rome and good wishes, allowed them to remain in power.

Tigranes IV issued bronze coins with portraits of himself with Augustus with the inscription in Greek βασιλεύς μέγας νέος Τιγράνης (of great new king Tigranes), also issued coins shared by Erato with the inscription in Greek Έρατω βασιλέως Τιγράνου άδελφή (Erato, sister of King Tigranes). Other coinage Tigranes IV and Erato issued together, is a portrait of Tigranes IV heavily bearded with Erato with the Greek legend great king, Tigranes.

Sometime about 1 AD Tigranes IV was killed in battle, perhaps ending an internal Armenian revolt of those who were infuriated by the royal couple becoming allies to Rome. The war and the chaos that occurred afterwards, Erato abdicated her throne and ended her rule over Armenia.

From the situation surrounding Tigranes IV and Erato, the Armenians requested to Augustus, a new Armenian king. Augustus found and appointed Ariobarzanes as the new king of Armenia in 1 AD (or 2). Ariobarzanes through his father was a distant relative of the Artaxiad dynasty as he was a descendant of an Artaxiad princess whose name is unknown who was a sister of King Artavasdes II of Armenia who married Ariobarzanes' paternal ancestor Mithridates, a previous ruling king of Media Atropatene.

== Sources ==
- R. Naroll, V.L. Bullough & F. Naroll, Military Deterrence in History: A Pilot Cross-Historical Survey, SUNY Press, 1974
- E. Yarshater, The Cambridge History of Iran, Vol. III, Part I, Cambridge University Press, 1983
- W.G. Sayles, Ancient Coin Collecting IV: Roman Provincial Coins (Google eBook), F+W Media, Inc, 1998
- R.G. Hovannisian, The Armenian People from Ancient to Modern Times, Volume 1: The Dynastic Periods: From Antiquity to the Fourteenth Century, Palgrave Macmillan, 2004
- Swan, Peter Michael (2004). The Augustan Succession: An Historical Commentary on Cassius Dio's Roman History, Books 55-56 (9 B.C.-A.D. 14). Oxford University Press.
- V.M. Kurkjian, A History of Armenia, Indo-European Publishing, 2008
- M. Bunsen, Encyclopedia of the Roman Empire, Infobase Printing, 2009
- M.A. Ehrlich, Encyclopedia of the Jewish Diaspora: Origins, Experiences, and Culture, Volume 1 (Google eBook), ABC-CLIO, 2009
- Armenia and Iran ii. The pre-Islamic period under Darius and Xerxes had much narrower boundaries than the future Armenia of the Artaxiads and the Arsacids. Armenia and Iran, ii. The Pre-Islamic Period: 3. The Artaxiad dynasty b. Tigranes the Great

Tigranes IV Artaxiad dynasty
Preceded by Tigranes III	Roman Client King of Armenia; 8 BC – 1 AD and 2 BC – 1 AD with Erato	Succeeded by Non-dynastic (Ariobarzanes II)
