= Artavasdes II of Armenia =

Artavasdes II
- King of Kings
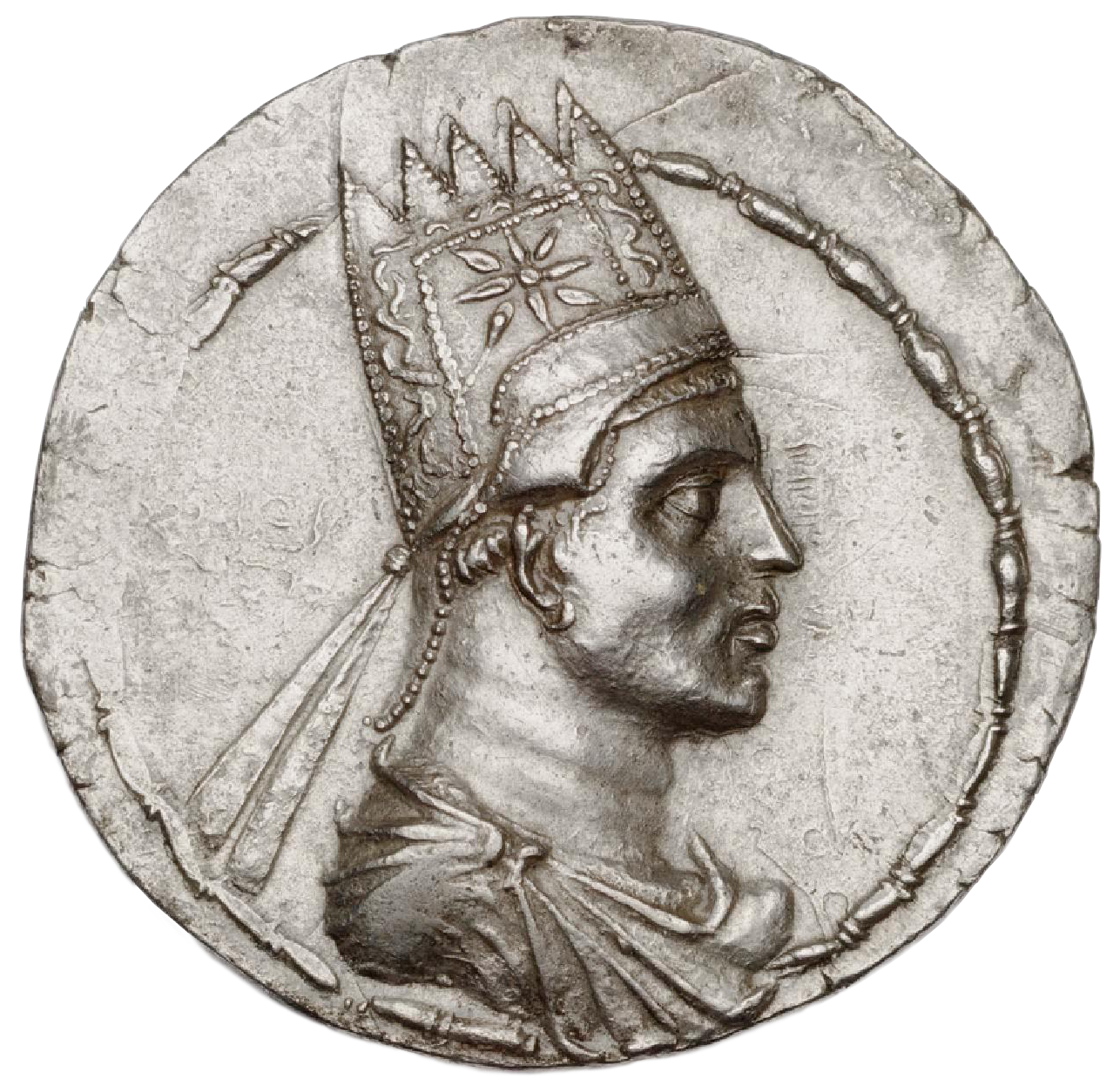
- Silver tetradrachm with bust of Artavasdes II

King of Armenia
- Reign: 55–34 BC
- Predecessor: Tigranes the Great
- Successor: Alexander Helios (de facto); Artaxias II (de jure)
- Died: 31 BC; Alexandria, Egypt
- Issue: Artaxias II; Tigranes III
- Dynasty: Artaxiad dynasty
- Father: Tigranes the Great
- Religion: Zoroastrianism

Artavasdes II (Ancient Greek: Ἀρταουάσδης Artaouásdēs), also known as Artavazd II, was king of Armenia from 55 BC to 34 BC. A member of the Artaxiad dynasty, he was the son and successor of Tigranes the Great (r. 95–55 BC), who ascended the throne of a still powerful and independent state. Like his father, Artavasdes continued using the title of King of Kings, as seen from his coins.

== Name ==
Artavasdes' name is the Latin attestation of an Old Iranian name *Ṛtavazdah-, identical to the Avestan Ašavazdah, presumably meaning "powerful/persevering through truth". It is attested in Armenian as Artavazd and in Greek as Artaouásdēs, Artabázēs, Artábazos, and Artáozos.

== Biography ==
In c. 54 BC, Marcus Licinius Crassus, one of the Roman triumvirs, who had become proconsul of Syria, had been preparing to invade the Parthian realm. Artavasdes II, who was an ally of Rome, advised Crassus to take a route through Armenia to avoid the desert and offered him reinforcements of a further 10,000 cavalry and 30,000 infantry. His reasoning was that the Parthian cavalry would be less potent in the Armenian highlands. Crassus refused the offer and decided to take the direct route through Mesopotamia.

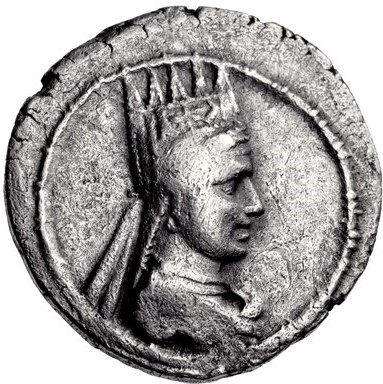
Artavasdes II's drachm, showing him wearing a tiara with Artaxiad coat of arms

As Crassus' army marched to Carrhae, the Parthian king Orodes II invaded Armenia, cutting off support from Artavasdes II. Orodes II persuaded Artavasdes II to a marriage alliance between the crown prince Pacorus I and Artavasdes II's sister. Crassus was shortly after defeated and killed by the forces led by Orodes II's general Surena. While Orodes II and Artavasdes II were observing a play of The Bacchae of Euripides at the Armenian court in honor of the wedding of Pacorus and Artavasdes II's sister, the Parthian commander Silaces announced the news of the victory at Carrhae, and put the head of Crassus at Orodes II's feet. The head was given to the producer of the play, who decided to use Crassus' actual severed head in place of the stage-prop head of Pentheus. Artavasdes and Orodes were then audience to a recital of Greek compositions, both kings being accomplished in Greek literature.

The death of Pacorus I in 38 BC and succession of Orodes II's other son Phraates IV damaged the relations between Parthia and Armenia.

In 36 BC the Roman general Mark Antony started his Parthian campaign. He allied himself with several kings of the region, including Artavasdes, who again switched sides. According to Plutarch, of the allied kings Artavasdes was "the greatest of them all[...] who furnished six thousand horse and seven thousand foot" to Antony. Artavasdes II also persuaded Antony to attack his enemy Artavasdes of Atropatene. Nevertheless, once Antony left Armenia to invade Atropatene, Artavasdes II "despairing of the Roman cause" abandoned Antony. Although Artavasdes II gave refuge and supplied the defeated Romans, in 34 BC Antony planned a new invasion of Armenia to take revenge for the betrayal. First he sent his friend Quintus Dellius, who offered a betrothal of Antony's six-year-old son Alexander Helios to a daughter of Artavasdes II, but the Armenian king hesitated. Now the triumvir marched into Roman western Armenia. He summoned Artavasdes II to Nicopolis, allegedly to prepare a new war against Parthia. Artavasdes II didn't come, so the Roman general quickly marched to the Armenian capital Artaxata. He arrested the king, hoping with his hostage's assistance to obtain great treasures in the Armenian castles. His son Artaxias II was elected as successor. After a lost battle Artaxias II fled to the Parthian king. Finally Antony took Artavasdes II to Alexandria.

The Armenian king and his family, who were bound with golden chains, had to follow Antony in his triumphal procession. Cleopatra VII of Egypt awaited the triumvir on a golden throne, but Artavasdes II refused to render homage to the Egyptian Queen by proskynesis.

In 31 BC, after Antony's defeat at the Battle of Actium, Cleopatra had Artavasdes decapitated. He had been an enemy of his namesake, King Artavasdes I of Media Atropatene, an ally of Antony and Cleopatra. She sent his head to Artavasdes I of Media Atropatene to secure his help.

Plutarch described Artavasdes II as a well-educated man, who had a great fondness for all things Greek and was an accomplished scholar who composed Greek tragedies and histories. From a wife whose name is unknown, he had two sons: Artaxias II, Tigranes III, and a daughter who possibly married King Archelaus of Cappadocia.

== Legacy ==
The memory of Artavasdes' imprisonment in Egypt was preserved in an Armenian popular legend conveyed by Movses Khorenatsi, in which Artavasdes is cursed by his father and imprisoned by the spirits known as the k’ajk’ inside Mount Ararat, while the people of Armenia await his return. In the legend, Artavasdes is partially conflated with his brother Tigranes the Younger.

== Bibliography ==
=== Ancient works ===
- Cassius Dio, Roman History
- Plutarch, Parallel Lives
- Tacitus, Annals

=== Modern works ===
- Bivar, A. D. H. (1983). "The Political History of Iran Under the Arsacids". In Yarshater, Ehsan (ed.). The Cambridge History of Iran: The Seleucid, Parthian and Sasanian Periods. Vol. 3(1). Cambridge: Cambridge University Press. pp. 21–99. ISBN 0-521-20092-X.
- Brosius, Maria (2006), The Persians: An Introduction, London & New York: Routledge, ISBN 978-0-415-32089-4
- Boyce, Mary (1984). Zoroastrians: Their Religious Beliefs and Practices. Psychology Press. pp. 1–252. ISBN 9780415239028.
- Boyce, Mary; Grenet, Frantz (1991). Beck, Roger (ed.). A History of Zoroastrianism, Zoroastrianism under Macedonian and Roman Rule. Leiden: Brill. ISBN 978-9004293915.
- Curtis, Vesta Sarkhosh (2007). "Religious iconography on ancient Iranian coins". Journal of Late Antiquity. London: 413–434.
- Dąbrowa, Edward (2018). "Arsacid Dynastic Marriages" (PDF). Electrum. 25: 73–83. doi:10.4467/20800909EL.18.005.8925.
- Garthwaite, Gene Ralph (2005), The Persians, Oxford & Carlton: Blackwell Publishing, Ltd., ISBN 978-1-55786-860-2.
- Katouzian, Homa (2009), The Persians: Ancient, Medieval, and Modern Iran, New Haven & London: Yale University Press, ISBN 978-0-300-12118-6.
- Kennedy, David (1996), "Parthia and Rome: eastern perspectives", in Kennedy, David L.; Braund, David (eds.), The Roman Army in the East, Ann Arbor: Cushing Malloy Inc., Journal of Roman Archaeology: Supplementary Series Number Eighteen, pp. 67–90, ISBN 978-1-887829-18-2
- Lang, David Marshall (2021). Armenia: Cradle of Civilization. Routledge.
- Marciak, Michał (2017). Sophene, Gordyene, and Adiabene: Three Regna Minora of Northern Mesopotamia Between East and West. BRILL. ISBN 9789004350724.
- Lee E., Patterson (2015). "Antony and Armenia". TAPA. 145: 77–105. doi:10.1353/apa.2015.0006. ISSN 1533-0699. S2CID 162878359.
- Russell, James R. (1987). Zoroastrianism in Armenia. Harvard University Press. ISBN 978-0674968509.
- Schmitt, R. (1986). "Artavasdes". Encyclopaedia Iranica, Vol. II, Fasc. 6. p. 653.
- Shayegan, M. Rahim (2011). Arsacids and Sasanians: Political Ideology in Post-Hellenistic and Late Antique Persia. Cambridge University Press. pp. 1–539. ISBN 9780521766418.
- Garsoïan, Nina (1997). "The Emergence of Armenia". In Hovannisian, Richard G. (ed.). The Armenian People from Ancient to Modern Times. Vol. I. New York: St. Martin's Press. pp. 37–60. ISBN 978-0-312-10169-5.
- Strugnell, Emma (2006), "Ventidius' Parthian War: Rome's Forgotten Eastern Triumph", Acta Antiqua, 46 (3): 239–252, doi:10.1556/AAnt.46.2006.3.3
- Syme, Ronald (1939), The Roman Revolution, Oxford: Oxford University Press, ISBN 978-0-19-280320-7

Artavasdes II of Armenia Artaxiad dynasty Born: unknown Died: 31 BC
| Preceded by Tigranes II | King of Armenia; 55 BC – 34 BC | Succeeded by Artaxias II |
