= Tigranes III =

King of Armenia from 20 to 8 BC

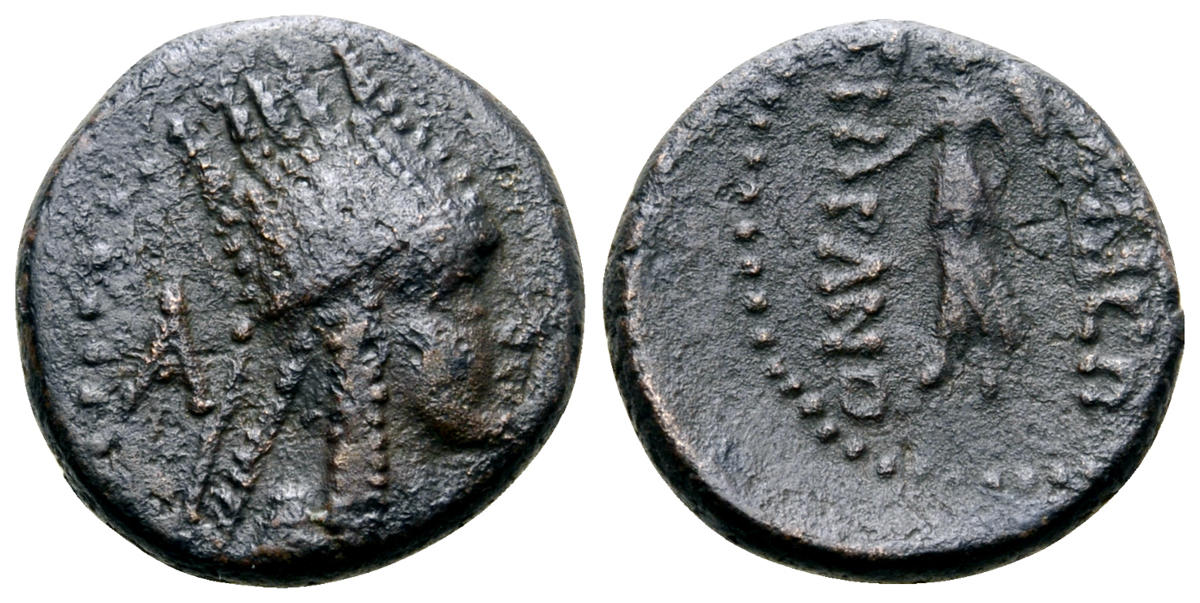
- A tetradrachm of Tigranes III

King of Armenia
- Reign: 20 – 8 BC
- Predecessor: Artaxias II
- Successor: Tigranes IV and Erato
- Died: 8 BC
- Issue: Tigranes IV; Erato of Armenia
- Dynasty: Artaxiad
- Father: Artavasdes II
- Religion: Zoroastrianism

Tigranes III (50s BC–8 BC) was a prince of the Kingdom of Armenia and member of the Artaxiad dynasty who served as a Roman client king of Armenia.

== Family background and early life ==
Tigranes III was the second son born to Artavasdes II of Armenia by a mother whose name is unknown. Tigranes III had an elder brother called Artaxias II and a sister, name unknown, who possibly married King Archelaus of Cappadocia. He was born and raised in Armenia. Tigranes III was the namesake of his paternal grandfather, a previous ruling Armenian King Tigranes the Great, also known as Tigranes II.

== Life in Roman captivity and rise to the Armenian kingship ==
The Roman Triumvir Mark Antony had captured Artavasdes II with his family, in which they were taken as political prisoners to Alexandria where Artavasdes II was later executed there on the orders of Ptolemaic Greek Queen Cleopatra VII of Egypt. In 34 BC, Artaxias II had escaped and fled to King Phraates IV of Parthia. With the support of Phraates IV, he invaded Armenia and place Artaxias II on the throne.

Sometime after the Battle of Actium in September 31 BC and Octavian (future Roman emperor Augustus) invaded Egypt in 30 BC in which he annexed the country to the rule of the Roman Republic, Tigranes III was taken from Alexandria to live in Rome. In Rome, Tigranes III had lived in political exile, in which during that time he was educated there. In 20 BC after living in Rome for 10 years, Artaxias II proved to be an unpopular leader with his people.

As the Armenians lost faith in their ruling monarch, they sent messengers to Augustus requesting him to remove Artaxias II from his throne and to install Tigranes III as his successor. Augustus agreed to the request from the Armenians. Augustus sent his step-son Tiberius, with Tigranes III with a large army to depose Artaxias II. Before Tiberius and Tigranes III arrived in Armenia, a cabal within the palace was successful in murdering Artaxias II. The Romans installed Tigranes III as the new King of Armenia unopposed.

== Armenian kingship ==
Tigranes III ruled as King of Armenia for 12 years. Although he reigned for a substantial period of time, little is known on his reign. His Armenian kingship brought peace, stability to Armenia in which peaceful relations between Rome and Armenia were maintained.

Tigranes III was survived by two children from two different mothers whose names are unknown: a son called Tigranes IV and a daughter, called Erato, who succeeded their father on the Armenian throne.

== Sources ==
- Res Gestae Divi Augusti, Paragraph 27 - 1st century
- R. Naroll, V.L. Bullough & F. Naroll, Military Deterrence in History: A Pilot Cross-Historical Survey, SUNY Press, 1974
- H. Temporini & W. Haase, Politische Geschichte (Provinzen Und Randvölker: Griechischer Balkanraum; Kleinasien): Griechischer Balkanraum; Kleinasien), Walter de Gruyter, 1980
- E. Yarshater, The Cambridge History of Iran, Cambridge University Press, 1983
- P.M. Swan, The Augustan Succession: An Historical Commentary on Cassius Dio's Roman History, Books 55-56 (9 B.C.-A.D. 14) (Google eBook), Oxford University Press, 2004
- M. Bunsen, Encyclopedia of the Roman Empire, Infobase Printing, 2009
- T. Daryaee, The Oxford Handbook of Iranian History, Oxford University Press, 2012
- History of Armenia by Vahan Kurkjian, Chapter 14: Artavazd – The last Tigranes

Tigranes III Artaxiad dynasty
Preceded by Artaxias II	Prince of Armenia; 20 BC – 8 BC	Succeeded by Tigranes IV and Erato
