= Claudia Capitolina =

1st century princess of Commagene

- Princess of Commagene
- Born: Rome, Roman Empire
- Died: after 92 CE
- Spouse: Gaius Julius Archelaus Antiochus Epiphanes; Marcus Junius Rufus
- Issue: Philopappos; Julia Balbilla
Names
- Claudia Capitolina
- House: Orontid
- Father: Tiberius Claudius Balbilus

Claudia Capitolina (Greek: η Κλαuδία Καπιτωλίνα) was a Princess of Commagene in the 1st century. She was an Egyptian Greek woman who lived in the Roman Empire and was married to Prince Gaius Julius Archelaus Antiochus Epiphanes.

== Life ==
Capitolina came from a distinguished family of Equestrian rank. She was born and raised in Alexandria, Egypt. Capitolina was the daughter and only child of Tiberius Claudius Balbilus by his unnamed wife. The cognomen Capitolina, is probably from her maternal side. Her father was one of the highest magistrates of Equestrian rank that served in Rome. Balbilus was an astrologer and a learned scholar, who was later Prefect of Egypt. Capitolina's paternal grandfather, was an Egyptian Greek Grammarian and Astrologer called Thrasyllus of Mendes or Tiberius Claudius Thrasyllus, who was a friend of the Roman Emperor Tiberius, while her paternal grandmother was Greek Princess Aka II of Commagene, who was a great, granddaughter of King Antiochus I Theos of Commagene. Her paternal cousin was Ennia Thrasylla who married the Praetorian prefect of the Praetorian Guard, Naevius Sutorius Macro.

=== Commagene ===
In 64, Capitolina married a Greek prince from the Kingdom of Commagene called Gaius Julius Archelaus Antiochus Epiphanes, who was a paternal second cousin to Capitolina. She is not mentioned by Roman sources, however has been identified as the wife of Epiphanes and mother of Epiphanes' children, through surviving honorific inscriptions and surviving honorific poetry dedicated to her. After Epiphanes married Capitolina, they settled and lived in the court of her father-in-law King Antiochus IV of Commagene. The relationship between Capitolina and Epiphanes is unknown. Capitolina bore Epiphanes in 65 their first son and child Gaius Julius Antiochus Epiphanes Philopappos in Samosata.

Capitolina lived in Commagene from 64 until 72. In 72 Lucius Caesennius Paetus, the Roman Governor of Syria had sent letters addressed to Roman Emperor Vespasian accusing Antiochus IV, Epiphanes and Epiphanes’ brother Callinicus in planning to revolt against Rome and allying themselves with the King of Parthia. Paetus accused in these letters that Antiochus IV, Epiphanes and Callinicus of disloyalty to the emperor. It is not known whether if these accusations were true or false. After reading the letters, Vespasian felt that he could no longer trust the family of Antiochus IV and could not trust them to protect the strategic crossing at the Euphrates River at Samosata. Vespasian gave orders to Antiochus IV to terminate his rule in Commagene.

Paetus invaded the Kingdom of Commagene, as head of the Legio VI Ferrata. The client Kings Aristobulus of Chalcis and Sohaemus of Emesa also supplied troops to Paetus. They all arrived the night before the battle. As Epiphanes and Callinicus prepared themselves that night for war, Antiochus IV was preparing to flee to Cilicia.

The next morning that the war was supposed to occur Epiphanes with Capitolina and their son with Callinicus out of fear of the Romans fled to the King of Parthia, while Antiochus IV also out of fear of the Romans fled to Cilicia. There is a possibility that Epiphanes and Callinicus had a short-lived attempt to resist invasion, before they fled to Parthia.

=== Later life ===
The family of Antiochus IV had let their own army and the citizens of Commagene down. Antiochus IV and his family never considered to cause a war with Rome and they wanted to clear themselves of these accusations. Vespasian brought peacefully back to Rome, Epiphanes; Capitolina, their son with Callinicus in an honourable Roman Military Escort. Capitolina; Epiphanes, their son with Callinicus lived in Rome with Antiochus IV for the remainder of his life. Vespasian had given Antiochus IV and his family sufficient revenue to live on. Antiochus IV and his family had a glamorous life and were treated with great respect.

In 72, Capitolina bore Epiphanes another child, a daughter named Julia Balbilla in Rome. After the death of Antiochus IV, Capitolina; Epiphanes and their family moved and finally settled in Athens Greece.

Capitolina's father died in 79. Balbilus was a friend to the first Roman Emperors, including Vespasian. Vespasian thought very highly of him and dedicated a sporting festival called the Balbillean Games, named and held in honor of his memory which was held at Ephesus from 79 well into the 3rd century.

In Ephesus, there are surviving inscriptions in Capitolina's name and in her late father's name. These surviving inscriptions are honorific ones, which dedicate and honor Capitolina as the daughter of Balbilus and as an honorary participate of the Balbillean Games at Ephesus.

After the death of Epiphanes in Athens in 92, Capitolina returned to Alexandria. Capitolina lived her remaining years in Egypt and married the politician Marcus Junius Rufus between 94 and 98.

Her son remained in Athens where he became a prominent citizen. Her daughter became a prominent poet and became a travelling friend to the Roman Emperor Hadrian and wife Roman Empress Vibia Sabina. In a surviving poem written by Balbilla dedicated to the memory to her parents and her grandfathers, Balbilla describes her parents as ‘pious’ people and writes very highly of her ancestry.
