= Balbillus =

Balbillus or Balbilus is a name that may refer to one of several people who lived in Ancient Rome:

- Gaius Balbillus, fl. 1st century CE, prefect of Roman Egypt
- Tiberius Claudius Balbilus, fl. 1st century CE, astrologer to several Roman emperors, possibly identical with the above
- Julia Balbilla, fl. 1st-2nd century CE, granddaughter of Tiberius Claudius Balbilus, member of the royal family of the Kingdom of Commagene
- Titus Julius Balbillus, fl. 2nd-3rd century CE, aristocrat of Roman Syria
- Tiberius Julius Balbillus, fl. 2nd-3rd century CE, a relation of the previous, and also an aristocrat of Roman Syria
