= Marcus Junius Rufus =

1st century Roman eques and governor of Egypt

Marcus Junius Rufus was a Roman eques who lived in the 1st century. A member of the ancient gens Junia, is best known for being praefectus or governor of Roman Egypt from 94 to 98. This was an important post, for Egypt supplied a large share of the grain needs of Rome. Rufus showed himself a capable governor, for he held his appointment over the reigns of three Emperors.

Although it can be assumed Rufus passed through the tres militiae, the normal beginning of careers for equites, the only office attested for him is his governorship. While governor, he married Claudia Capitolina, the daughter of Tiberius Claudius Balbilus, who had been governor of Egypt a generation before. He was Capitolina's second husband; her first husband was the prince of Commagene, Gaius Julius Archelaus Antiochus Epiphanes who had died in Athens in 92.

In his monograph on polyonymous names of the first centuries of the Roman Empire, Olli Salomies notes that while some have suggested that Rufus had adopted the consul of 128, Marcus Junius Mettius Rufus, he points out that the cognomen "Rufus" goes with the nomen "Mettius" and concludes "there need not be a connection between the prefect and the consul."

After Junius Rufus stepped down from his appointment in Egypt, his life is a blank.

== Sources ==
Political offices
Preceded by Titus Petronius Secundus	Prefect of Egypt; 94–98	Succeeded by Gaius Pompeius Planta
