= Tiberius Claudius Balbilus =

Roman imperial court astrologer

Tiberius Claudius Balbillus Modestus (died June AD 79), more commonly known as Tiberius Claudius Balbilus, was a distinguished Ancient Roman scholar, politician and a court astrologer to the Roman emperors Claudius, Nero, and Vespasian.

== Forms of his name ==
Other forms of Balbilus's name include the Latin forms Tiberius Claudius Balbillus, Barbillus, Babilus, Balbillus and Balbillus the Wise, Greek forms include Ancient Greek: Τιβέριος Κλαύδιος Βαλβίλλος Μόδεστος, romanized: Tibérios Klaúdios Balbíllos Módestos, modern Greek transliteration Tivérios Kláfdios Valvíllos Módestos.

== Descent, family background and early life ==
It is generally assumed that Balbilus was born in Alexandria in Roman Egypt. He was a Roman equestrian of Greek descent. Balbilus was probably a son of Tiberius Claudius Thrasyllus, the Alexandrian scholar and astrologer who was an adviser to the Roman emperor Tiberius.

Balbilus had one known sibling, an elder unnamed sister, who married the Eques Lucius Ennius. Through her, Balbilus was the maternal uncle of Ennia Thrasylla who married the Praetorian prefect of the Praetorian Guard Naevius Sutorius Macro and perhaps, Lucius Ennius who was the father of Lucius Ennius Ferox, a Roman soldier who served during the reign of the Roman emperor Vespasian from 69 until 79. Although Balbilus was born and raised in Egypt, he was of the Roman equestrian order. Balbilus was a friend of Tiberius’ nephew, Claudius, whom Balbilus knew from when they were children and had met at his father's house.

A surviving papyrus found in Theogonis in Egypt, dated 26 August 34, mentions Balbilus as one of the owners of a bathhouse located in the city and the Papyrus mentions the Lease of the Bathhouse and taxation paid from its revenue. A second papyrus dated to his tenure in Egypt is a draft of a petition from tax collectors to excuse them from collecting the poll taxes for several villages where the inhabitants have either fled out of poverty or died without leaving heirs. At some date in the reign of Caligula, Balbilus left Rome and returned to Alexandria.

== Political career ==
Balbilus military and political career began when Claudius came to the imperial throne. Following the assassination of Caligula (January 41), Balbilus returned to Rome to support Claudius. Balbilus accompanied Claudius on his expedition to Britain in 43, serving as a military tribune in Legio XX Valeria Victrix and as the Commander of the Military Engineers. When Claudius returned with the Roman Legions from Britain to Rome, Balbilus was awarded a crown of honour.

According to Suetonius, Claudius awarded Balbilus a Hasta Pura and perhaps a corona aurea during the Triumph to celebrate the conquest of Britain in 44. As Balbilus was a part of his retinue, it seems likely that his awards, as much as his military rank, were honorary.

Balbilus was one of the highest ranking Equestrian Magistrates who served in Rome. After Balbilus returned to Rome from the Roman conquest of Britain, he received an important post in Egypt. While in Alexandria, Balbilus was appointed High Priest at the Temple of Hermes and Director of the Library, he split his time between Alexandria and Rome. Sometime later he served as a Procurator of the Asia province.

In October 54, Claudius died and was succeeded by Nero as Roman emperor. Under Nero, Balbilus was appointed Prefect of Egypt where he served from 55 until 59. After his prefecture ended in Egypt, Balbilus continued to live in Alexandria. Some scholars -- notably Arthur Stein, editor of the Balbillus entry in the Prosopographia Imperii Romani -- contended that Balbilus the astrologer and Balbilus the prefect of Egypt (sometimes referred to as "Gaius Balbillus") were different people, though this is not the universal consensus.

== Astrology ==
Balbilus followed his father in developing skills in astrology. He became a leading astrologer of his time in Rome. He remained in Rome during Claudius’ reign as his advisor, after Claudius had passed an edict expelling all astrologers from the city. Balbilus foretold an eclipse which fell on one of the emperor's birthdays.

During the reign of Nero, Balbilus served as an astrological adviser to him and his mother, Agrippina the Younger. A comet had passed across the sky in either 60 or 64, signalling the death of a great personage. Balbilus tried to calm Nero's fears by noting that the usual solution was to murder prominent citizens, thus appeasing the gods and Nero agreed, killing many nobles. As Balbilus proved to be a capable (and wily) astrologer, he avoided the fatal end of many astrologers under Nero.

During the reign of Roman emperor Vespasian from 69 until 79, Balbilus returned to Rome from Alexandria and served as an astrologer to Vespasian.

Balbilus was a learned man. Seneca the Younger describes him as ‘an excellent man of most rare learning in every branch of studies’. He wrote an astrology treatise, titled Astrologumena, of which only fragments have survived. The book was addressed to Hermogenes.

== Family and issue ==
The identity of the wife of Balbilus is unknown; most probably she was a Greek noblewoman from the aristocracy of the Roman Near East. There is a possibility that the wife of Balbilus may have been royalty, possibly Commagenian. By his wife Balbilus had a daughter called Claudia Capitolina. The nomen Claudia she inherited from her father's family while the Cognomen Capitolina, she may have inherited from her mother's family.

In 64, Capitolina married her cousin, Gaius Julius Archelaus Antiochus Epiphanes, son of King Antiochus IV of Commagene, and his sister-wife, Queen Iotapa. Capitolina bore Epiphanes one son, called Gaius Julius Antiochus Epiphanes Philopappos and one daughter, called Julia Balbilla.

Balbilus has two further namesakes the Emesene Priests of the cult of El-Gebal in Rome, Tiberius Julius Balbillus and his relative, Titus Julius Balbillus who lived in the second half of the 2nd century and the first half of the 3rd century. Like Balbilus, both were descendants of the King Antiochus I of Commagene, through Balbilus’ maternal aunt Iotapa who married into the Emesene dynasty.

== Posthumous honours ==
In his later years Balbilus lived in Ephesus. Vespasian granted privileges to him and his city of Ephesus because of his proficiency as an astrologer. Balbilus died in 79, possibly in June of that year.

As Vespasian thought very highly of him, he dedicated and allowed Ephesians to institute games held in his honour. These games became a sporting festival called the Balbillean Games. This festival was held at Ephesus from 79 well into the 3rd century. An inscription in Ephesus honours Balbilus and his daughter.

Balbilus was honoured by his granddaughter Julia Balbilla in two epigrams in Aeolic Greek which are dated to 130. The two epigrams are a part of four epigrams recorded which are inscribed and are preserved on the lower sections of one of the Colossi of Memnon. These are two massive stone statues built by the Egyptian Pharaoh Amenhotep III (flourished 14th century BC), to stand guard at the entrance of Amenhotep's memorial temple. Balbilla had lived in Egypt and was an escort to the Roman emperor Hadrian and his wife, Vibia Sabina when they visited the country. The inscriptions that Balbilla commissioned commemorated their visit to Egypt.

In the inscriptions on the Colossi of Memnon, Balbilla acknowledged and made reference to her royal and aristocratic descent. In the last two lines of the second epigram, she honours her family including Balbilus:

For my parents were noble, and my grandfathers,
The wise Balbillus and Antiochus the king.

The fourth and final epigram, Balbilla dedicates to her parents and grandfathers. This epigram is dedicated also to her noble and aristocratic blood. In the epigram, Balbilla mentions that Balbilus has royal lineage.

For pious were my parents and grandfathers: Balbillus the Wise and King
Antiochus; Balbillus, the father of my mother of royal blood and king
Antiochus, the father of my father. From their line I too draw my noble
blood, and these verses are mine, pious Balbilla.

== Balbilus in fiction ==
- The Hasta Pura of Balbilus is mentioned in the second part of the novel series, written by Robert Graves, I, Claudius and Claudius the God. Graves calls the decoration an "arrow without a head" and refers to its award to Balbilus.
- Balbilus's role as court astrologer is referred to throughout the fourth to sixth parts of the novel series Romanike by Codex Regius (2006–2014)
- The character of Barbillus in the Cambridge Latin Course, a wealthy but superstitious Alexandrian with an interest in astrology living around AD 79, is based on Balbilus. (Note: As stated by Caroline Bristow, director of the Cambridge Schools Classics Project, in 2023.)

== Sources ==
- Thrasyllus’ article at ancient library
- Barbillus’ article at ancient library
- Babilus’ article at ancient library
- P. Robinson Coleman-Norton & F. Card Bourne, Ancient Roman Statutes, The Lawbook Exchange Limited, 1961
- G.H. Halsberghe, The Cult of Sol Invictus, Brill, 1972
- H. Temporini & W. Haase, 2, Principat: 9, 2, Walter de Gruyter, 1978
- B. Levick, Tiberius: The Politician, Routledge, 1999
- J. Hazel, Who's who in the Roman World, Psychology Press, 2002
- E.A. Hemelrijk, Matrona Docta: Educated Women in the Roman Élite from Cornelia to Julia Domna, Routledge, 2004
- R. Beck, Beck on Mithraism: Collected Works With New Essays, Ashgate Publishing Limited, 2004
- J.H. Holden, A History of Horoscopic Astrology, American Federation of Astrology, 2006
- M. Bunsen, Encyclopedia of the Roman Empire, Infobase Publishing, 2009
- H. Willer Laale, Ephesus (Ephesos): An Abbreviated History from Androclus to Constantine XI (Google eBook), WestBow Press, 2011
- Martin Gansten, "Balbillus and the Method of aphesis", Greek, Roman, and Byzantine Studies, 52 (2012), pp. 587–602

Political offices
Preceded by Lucius Lusius Geta	Prefect of Egypt; 55–59	Succeeded by Lucius Julius Vestinus
