= Philopappos Monument =

Mausoleum and monument in Athens, Greece

Coordinates: 37.967427°N 23.721183°E

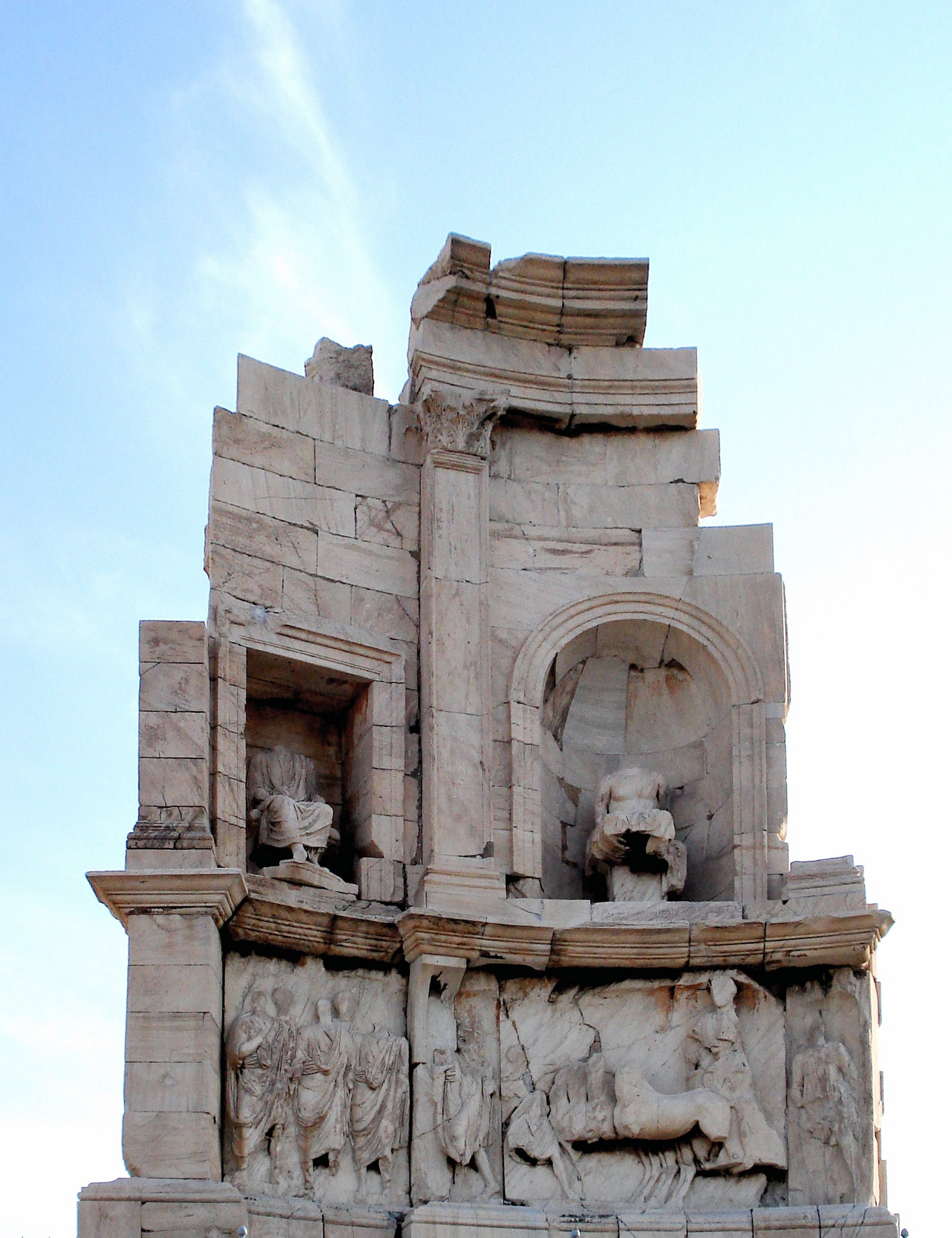
The Philopappos Monument.

The Philopappos Monument (Greek: Μνημείο Φιλοπάππου, Mnimío Philopáppou, [mniˈmio filoˈpapu]) is an ancient Roman mausoleum and monument dedicated to Gaius Julius Antiochus Epiphanes Philopappos or Philopappus (Greek: Γάιος Ιούλιος Αντίοχος Επιφανής Φιλόπαππος, 65–116 AD), a prince from the Kingdom of Commagene. It is located on Mouseion Hill in Athens, Greece, southwest of the Acropolis.

== Origins ==
Philopappos died in 116 AD, and his death caused great grief to his sister Julia Balbilla, citizens of Athens and possibly to the imperial family. As a dedication to honor the memory of Philopappos, Balbilla with the citizens of Athens erected a tomb structure on Muses Hill (Λόφος Μουσών) near the Acropolis of Athens. His marble tomb monument is still known as the Philopappos (or Philopappou) Monument, and the hill is today known as Philopappou Hill (Λόφος Φιλοπάππου).

The Greek geographer Pausanias describes Philopappos' grand tomb as a monument built for a Syrian man. The monument was built on the same site where Mousaios or Musaeus, a 6th-century BC priestly poet and mystical seer, was held to have been buried. The location of this tomb, opposite the Acropolis and within formal boundaries of the city, shows the high position Philopappos had within Athenian society.

== Description ==
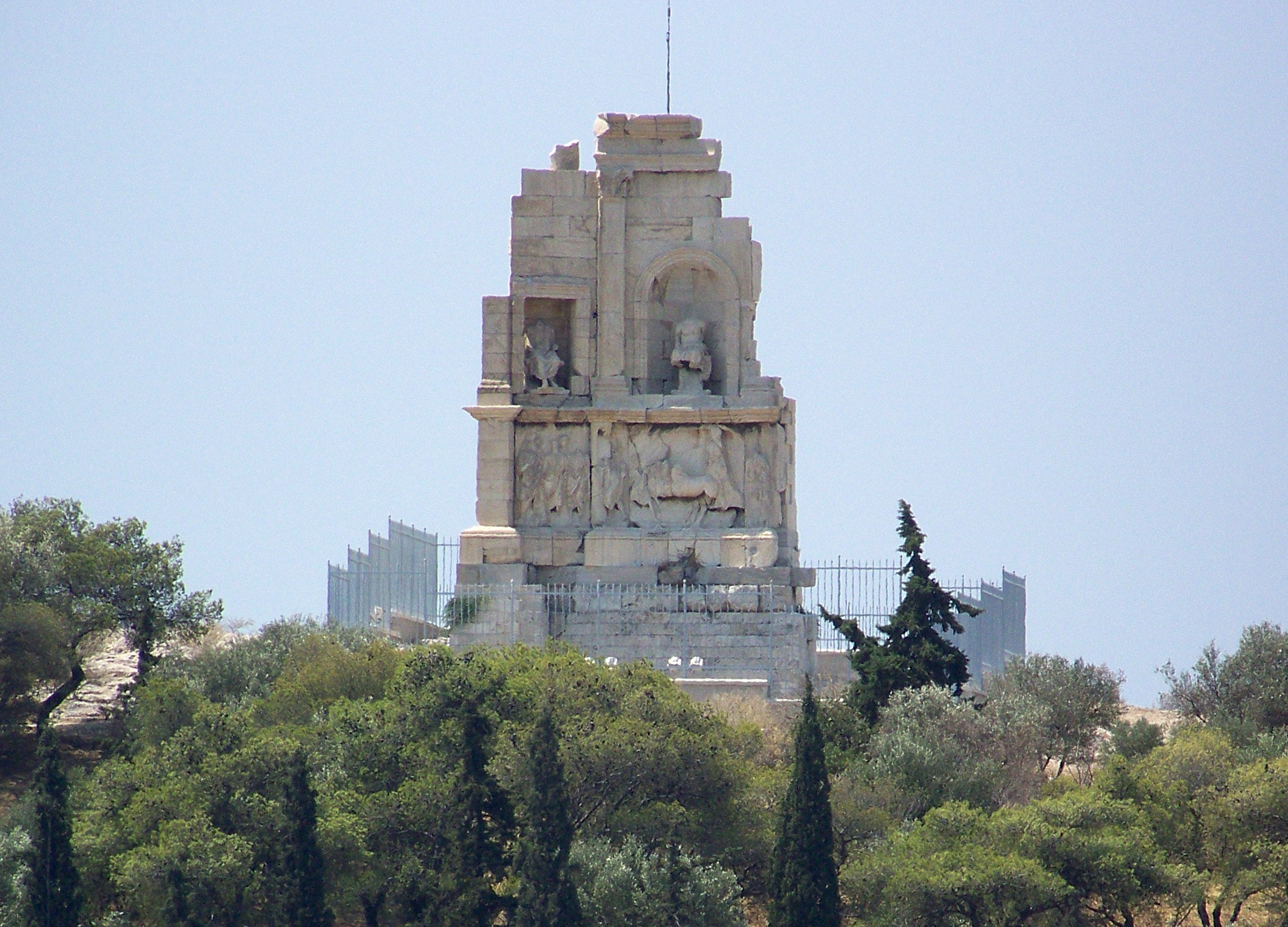
General view of the Philopappos Monument

Philopappos' monument is a two-story structure, supported by a base. On the lower level there is a frieze representing Philopappos as a consul, riding on a chariot and led by lictors. The upper level shows statues of three men: of Antiochus IV on the left, of Philopappos in the centre and of Seleucus I Nicator, now lost, on the right.

In the niche below Philopappos is an inscription in Greek: Φιλόπαππος Επιφάνους Βησαιεύς ("Philopappos, son of Epiphanes of the deme of the Besa"). This was the name Philopappos carried as an Athenian citizen. In the niche left of Philopappos, a Latin inscription records Philopappos' titles, honors and his career as a Roman magistrate: "Caius Iulius Antiochus Philopappos, son of Caius, of the Fabian tribe, consul and Arval brother, admitted to the praetorian rank by the emperor Caesar Nerva Trajan Optimus Augustus Germanicus Dacicus". On the right niche of Philopappos once stood a Greek inscription (now only the base is preserved): Βασιλεύς Αντίοχος Φιλόπαππος Βασιλέως Επιφανούς Αντιόχου ("King Antiochus Philopappos, son of King Antiochus Epiphanes").

Below the statue of Antiochus IV, Philopappos' paternal grandfather, is an inscription that states "King Antiochus son of King Antiochus". This inscription honors Antiochus IV and his late father, the last independent ruler of the Kingdom of Commagene, King Antiochus III Epiphanes. When Antiochus III died in 17, Commagene was annexed by the Roman Emperor Tiberius and became a part of the Roman Empire. Below the statue of Seleucus I, the founder of the Seleucid Empire from whom the Commagene kings claimed descent, stood another inscription, now lost. The traveller Cyriacus of Ancona wrote in his memoir that underneath the inscription stated "King Seleucus Nicator, son of Antiochus".

The monument measures 9.80 by 9.30 metres (32.2 ft × 30.5 ft), and contains Philopappos' burial chamber. The structure is built of white Pentelic marble on a socle 3.08 metres (10.1 ft) high, made of porous marble and veneered with slabs of Hymettian marble. The north side of Philopappos' monument bears lavish architectural decorations.

== Excavations and history ==
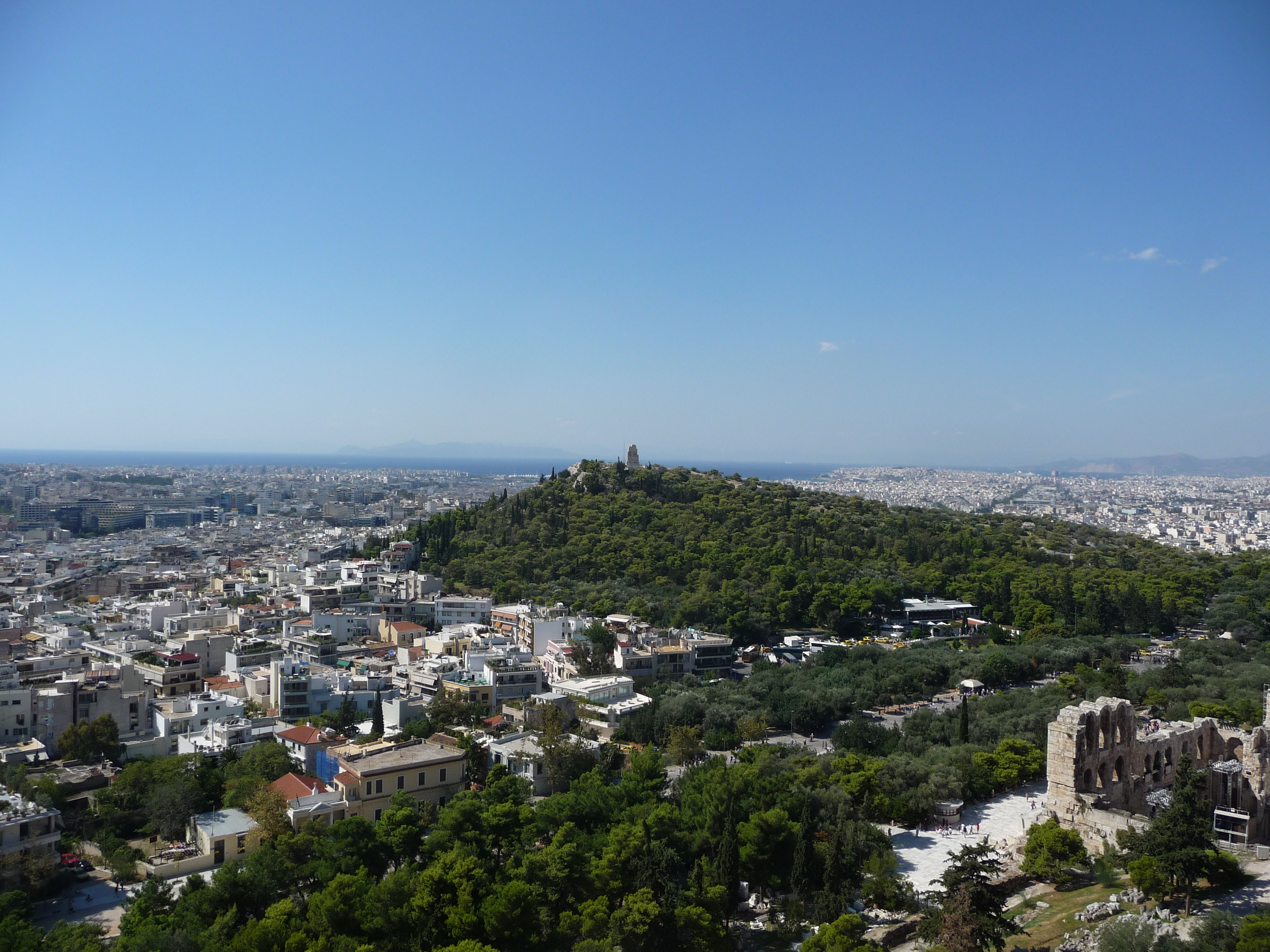
The Philopappu Monument on top of Muse Hill.

Prior to modern excavations, the most notable description of the monument was a drawing of the monument originating from the 13 century AD by Cyriacus from Ancona (1391-1452). Cyriacus, a travelling merchant, provided illustrations along with written letters to correspond with the verbal descriptions of what he saw in his travels. These primary anecdotes serve as evidence of how the structures appeared in the past, before they were either removed or deteriorated further.

In 1898, excavations were carried out at the monument and in 1899 conservation work was undertaken. In 1940, archaeologists H. A. Thompson and J. Travlos conducted small additional excavations. Recent investigations have certified that architectural parts of Philopappos' Monument were used for construction of the minaret in the Parthenon under the Ottomans.

Only two-thirds of the façade remains. The tomb chamber behind the façade is completely destroyed except for the base. The Philopappos Monument was apparently still intact in 1436, when the traveller Ciriaco de' Pizzicolli visited the monument and wrote in his memoirs that the monument was still intact. The destruction of the monument must have occurred after this time.

== Sources ==
- Athenaeus Deipnosophistae VIII.350c
- Josephus Bellum Judaeum 238-243
- Pausanias (geographer) I.25.8
- Plutarch Quaestiones Convivales 628a & Quomodo ab adulatore discernatur amicus 48e & 66c
- IG II² 1759, 3112, 3450, 3451, & 4511; IG V.2.524
- Inscriptions du Colosse de Memnon nos. 28-31, & OGIS 408

== Bibliography ==
- Kleiner, Diana E. E. (1983). The monument of Philopappos in Athens. Roma: G. Bretschneider. ISBN 9788885007680.
- Kunst, J. (2017). The Monument of Gaius Julius Antiochus Epiphanes Philopappos: a funerary monument in a visual, comparative, and environmental context in Athens (Master's thesis). Utrecht University.>.
