= Philopappos =

1st / 2nd century prince of Commagene and Roman and Athenian citizen

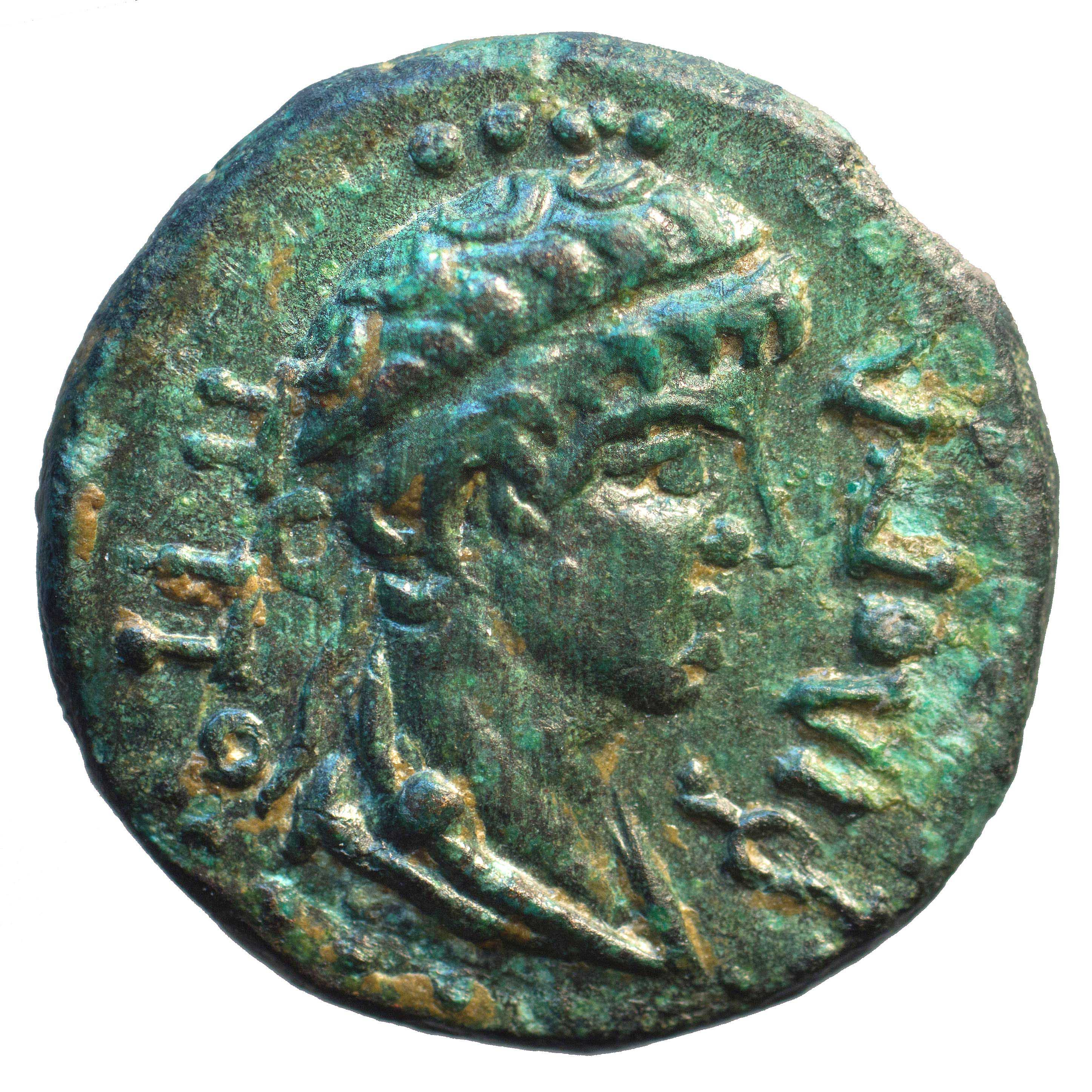
Bronze coin of Philopappos from Selinus (Cilicia) (ca. AD 72)

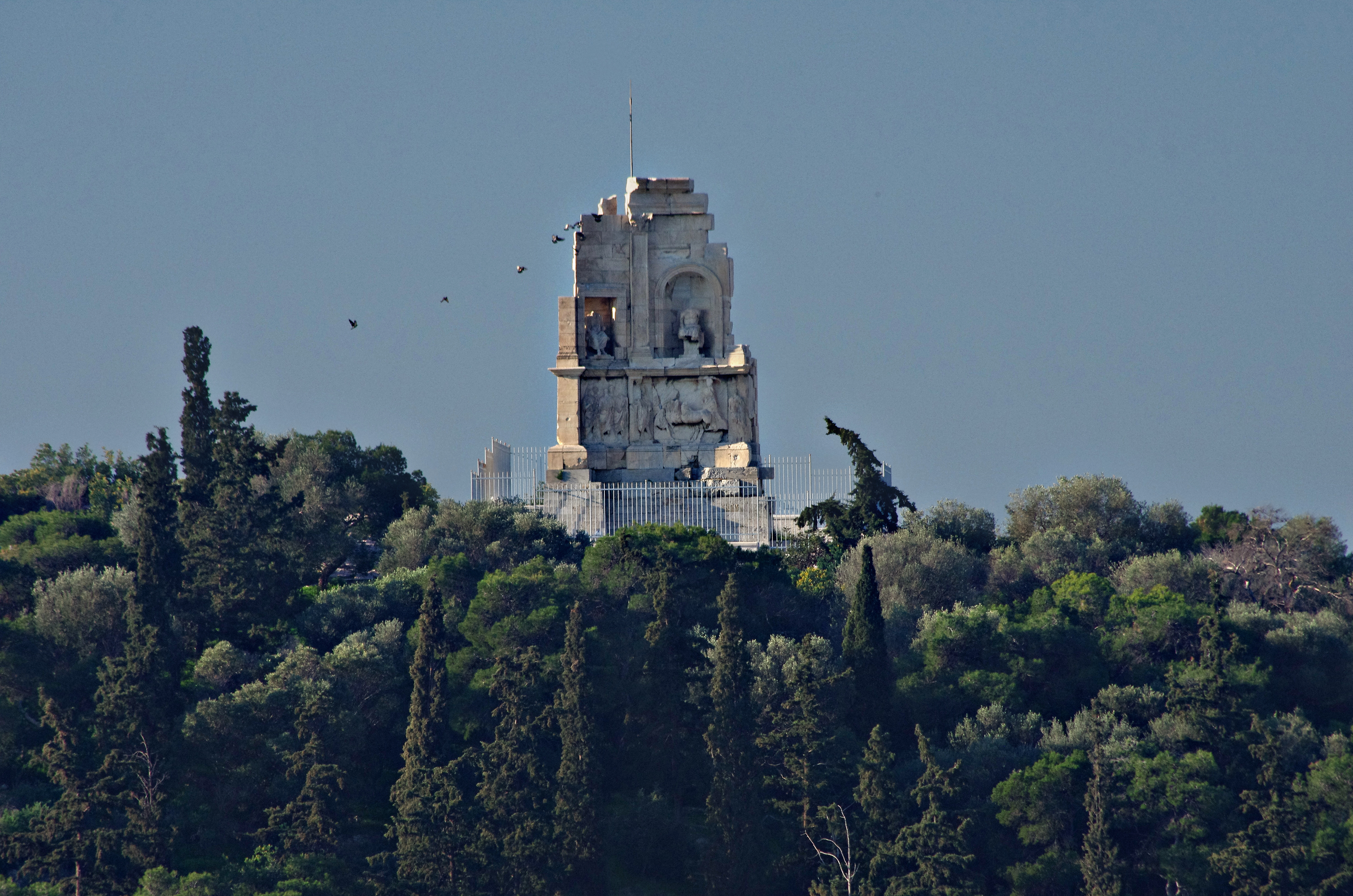
Mausoleum of Philopappos

Gaius Julius Antiochus Epiphanes Philopappos or Philopappus (Greek: Γάϊος Ἰούλιος Ἀντίοχος Ἐπιφανής Φιλόπαππος; 65 – 116), was a Prince of the Kingdom of Commagene who lived in the Roman Empire during the 1st century and 2nd century. He was one of the most prominent Greeks in the Empire.

== Ancestry, family and early life ==
Philopappos was a man of aristocratic and well-connected origins. He was the first-born son of the Greek prince of Commagene, Gaius Julius Archelaus Antiochus Epiphanes and an Egyptian Greek woman called Claudia Capitolina. His younger sister and only sibling was Julia Balbilla, the poet and personal friend to Emperor Hadrian and the Empress Vibia Sabina.

Philopappos’ parents were distantly related. The paternal grandmother of Claudia Capitolina was the Princess Aka II of Commagene, who was a great granddaughter of King Antiochus I Theos of Commagene, while his father was the first-born son of King Antiochus IV of Commagene and Queen Julia Iotapa of Commagene. Antiochus IV and Iotapa were direct descendants of Antiochus I Theos. Antiochus IV and Iotapa were husband, wife and full blooded-siblings. He was of Armenian, Greek and Median descent. Through his paternal grandparents, he could trace lineage to the Syrian Kingdom, the Seleucid Empire and the Ptolemaic Kingdom.

His maternal grandparents were Tiberius Claudius Balbilus and his wife, whose name is unknown. Balbilus was an astrologer and a learned scholar, who was later Prefect of Egypt. Balbilus and his father, an Egyptian Greek grammarian and astrologer called Thrasyllus of Mendes or Tiberius Claudius Thrasyllus, were friends to some of the first Roman Emperors, including Tiberius, Claudius, and Vespasian.

Philopappos was born in Samosata, the capital of the Kingdom of Commagene, in the court of the palace of Antiochus IV. Philopappos’ birth name was Gaius Julius Antiochus Epiphanes. His nickname and the name he is commonly known by today is Philopappos or Philopappus. Philopappos means Fond of Grandfather. He received this nickname because of his close relationship to Antiochus IV and possibly Tiberius Claudius Balbilus. Philopappos had a traditional Greek upper-class education.

In 72 AD, Lucius Caesennius Paetus, the Roman Governor of Syria, sent letters addressed to Vespasian accusing Antiochus IV, Philopappos's father Epiphanes, and his paternal uncle Callinicus of planning to revolt against Rome and of allying themselves with the King of Parthia. It is not known whether these accusations were true or false. After reading the letters Vespasian felt that he could longer trust the family of Antiochus IV to protect the strategic crossing at the Euphrates River at Samosata, and so he gave orders to Antiochus IV to terminate his rule in Commagene.

Paetus invaded the Kingdom of Commagene as head of the Legio VI Ferrata. The client Kings Aristobulus of Chalcis and Sohaemus of Emesa also supplied troops to Paetus, all of which arrived the night before the battle. As Epiphanes and Callinicus prepared themselves that night for war, Antiochus IV was preparing to flee to Cilicia.

On the morning of the day on which the battle was supposed to occur, out of fear of the Romans, Epiphanes, along with his family, and Callinicus fled to the King of Parthia while Antiochus IV fled to Cilicia. There is a possibility that Epiphanes and Callinicus had engaged in a short-lived attempt to resist invasion before they fled to Parthia. Vespasian brought Epiphanes and his family and Callinicus peacefully back to Rome with an honor guard. Epiphanes and his family and Callinicus lived in Rome with Antiochus IV for the remainder of his life. Vespasian gave Antiochus IV and his family sufficient revenue to live on, and so they had a glamorous life and were treated with great respect.

Philopappos and his family never returned to Commagene. Commagene was reorganized as a part of the Roman Province of Syria.

== Life after Commagene ==
In 72, Philopappos's sister Julia Balbilla was born in Rome. After the deaths of both of his grandfathers, Philopappos and his family settled in Athens. His father died in 92 of unknown causes, after which, Claudia Capitolina returned to her birth city of Alexandria, where she married for the second time to Marcus Junius Rufus, a politician. Capitolina spent her remaining years in her birth city; for a period of time Balbilla was with her mother, but later returned to Philopappos in Athens.

Philopappos always considered himself as having the status of a monarch. He spent the remainder of his life in Athens and became a prominent and respected benefactor of the city. Philopappos assumed civic, political, and religious duties in Athens and Rome. He belonged to the Roman elite and became friends with the Emperor Trajan and Trajan's heir and second paternal cousin Hadrian. Through Trajan and Hadrian, Philopappos also met their families.

Philopappos had Roman and Athenian citizenship. He served as an Archon in Athens and had become friends with Greek philosophers, through whom he became acquainted with the Greek historian Plutarch. In his writings, Plutarch describes Philopappos as ‘very generous and magnificent in his rewards’ and describes his character as ‘good-humored and eager for instruction’.

Philopappos served as a Choregos (producer for a chorus) twice; as an Agonothetes (magistrate of games) once and was a member of the Deme Besa. Between 105 and 116, Philopappos was made a member of the Arval Brethren, an ancient group of Roman priests who offered annual sacrifices to the Lares and the gods to guarantee good harvests.

Trajan appointed him to the Praetorian Guard in Rome. Thereafter, Trajan and Hadrian promoted him to the Roman Senate, even though neither his father nor paternal grandfather was of senatorial rank. Philopappos rose further through the ranks and served as a suffect consul in 109.

There is a possibility that Philopappos married at some point, and may have had children and further descendants; however, there are no surviving records of this.

== Philopappos Monument ==
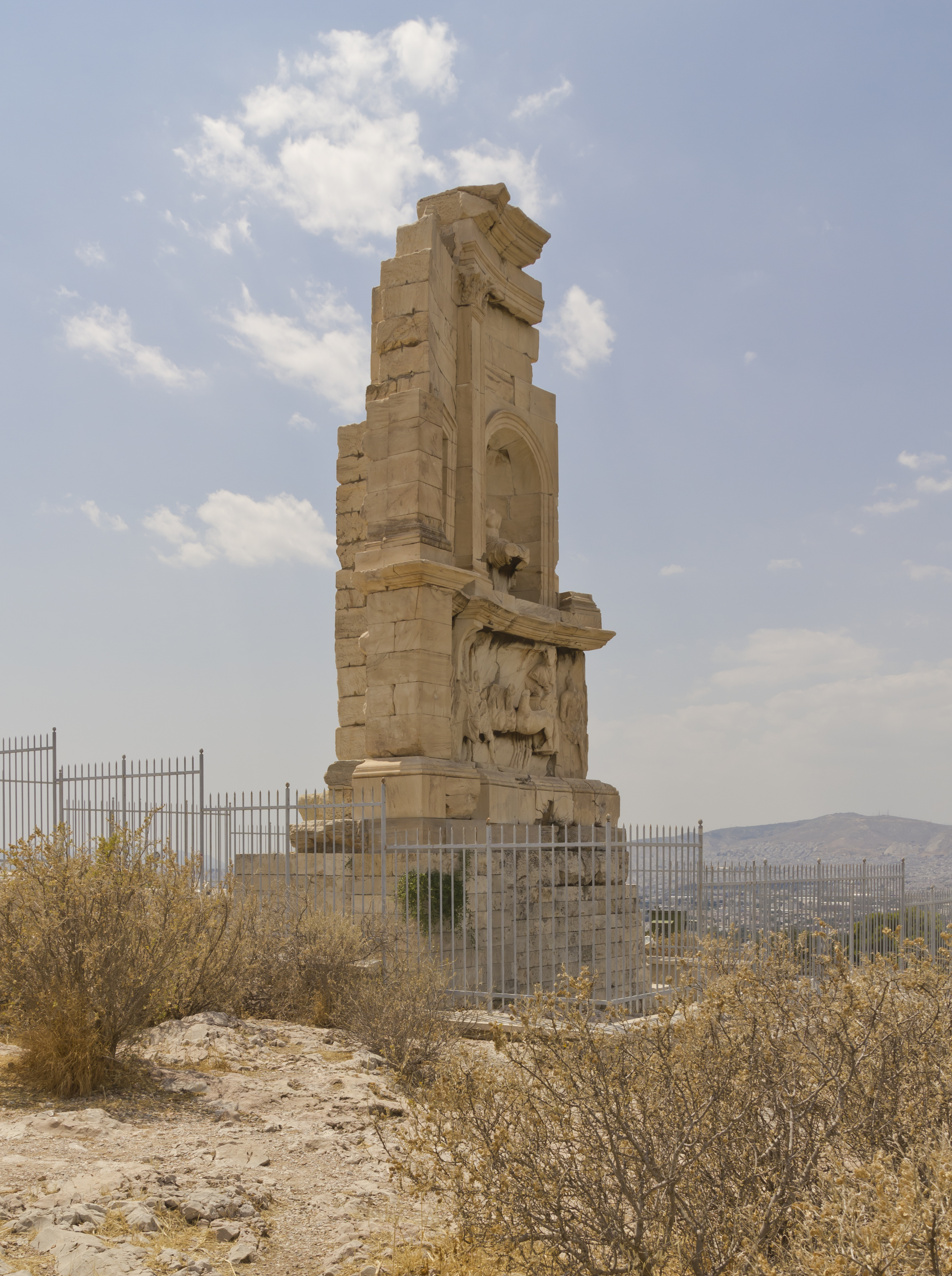
Philopappos Monument

Philopappos' death in 116 caused great sadness to his sister Julia Balbilla, the citizens of Athens, and possibly to the imperial family. To honor his memory, Balbilla, along with the citizens of Athens, erected a tomb structure on the Mouseion Hill, southwest of the Acropolis. His marble tomb is known as the “Philopappos Monument”, and from it, the hill became known as the “Philopappos Hill”.

== Philopappos in popular culture ==
One of the adversaries of the title character of Digenis Akritas is a leader of brigands named Philopappas. According to Dension Bingham Hall, the name of this character was taken from the historical personage, adding that "many legends surround this name, some of which have been woven into the poem."

== Sources ==
- Athenaeus Deipnosophistae VIII.350c
- Josephus Bellum Judaeum 238-243
- Pausanias (geographer) I.25.8
- Plutarch Quaestiones Convivales 628a & Quomodo ab adulatore discernatur amicus 48e & 66c
- IG II² 1759, 3112, 3450, 3451, & 4511; IG V.2.524
- Inscriptions du Colosse de Memnon nos. 28-31, & OGIS 408

== Bibliography ==
- Baslez, M. F. (1992). "La famille de Philopappos de Commagène, un prince entre deux mondes". Dialogues d'histoire ancienne. 18 (1): 89–101. doi:10.3406/dha.1992.1979.
- Kleiner, Diana E. E. (1983). The monument of Philopappos in Athens. Roma: G. Bretschneider. ISBN 9788885007680.

Political offices
Preceded by Lucius Annius Largus, and Publius Calvisius Tullus Ruso as consules suffecti	Suffect consul of the Roman Empire; 109 with Gnaeus Antonius Fuscus	Succeeded by Gaius Aburnius Valens, and Gaius Julius Proculus as consules suffecti
