= Aytap =

Coordinates: 36°19′14″N 32°14′06″E

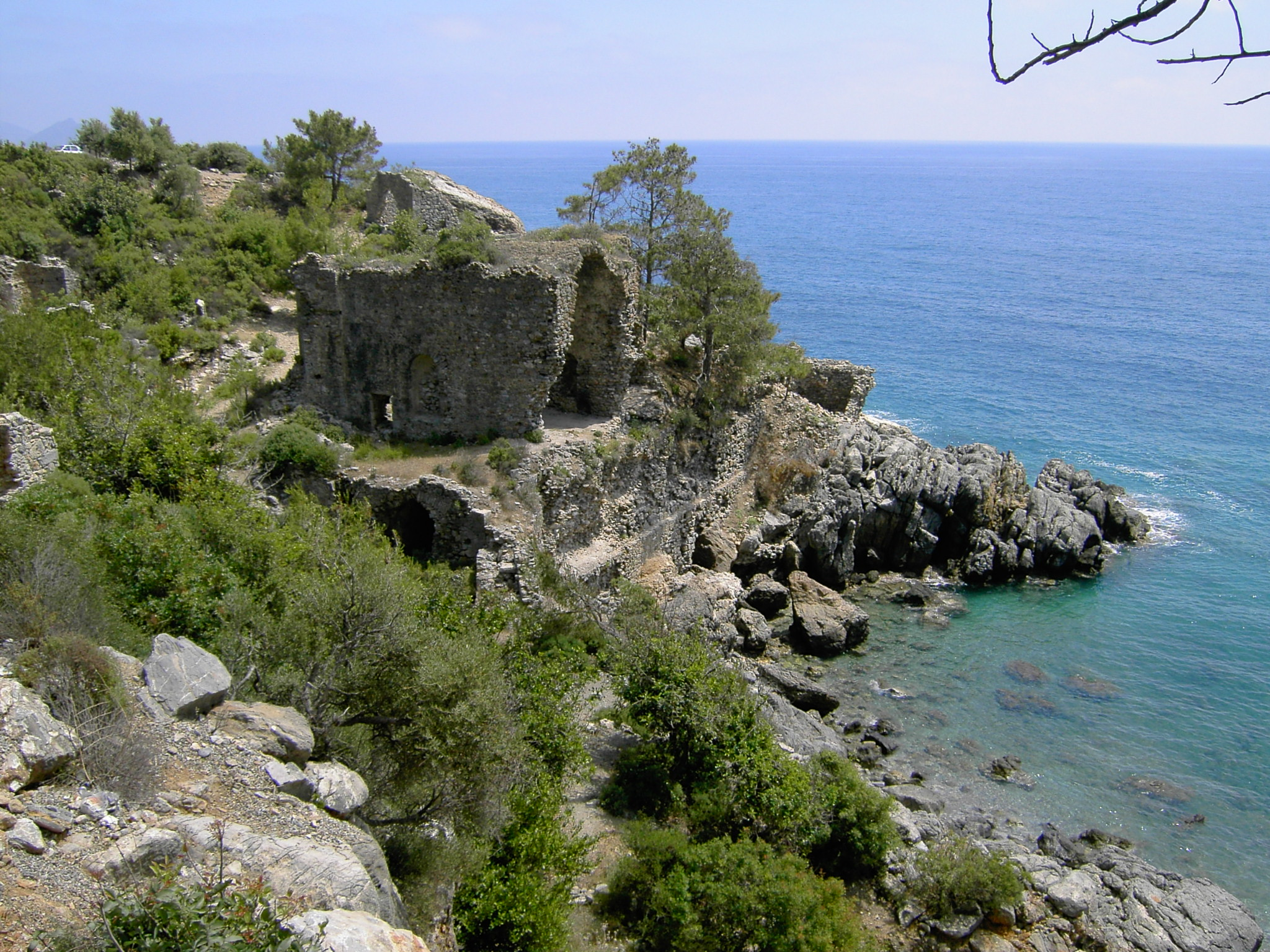
Ruins of the Cilician city of Iotapa (Aytap)

Aytap (Ancient Greek: Ἰωτάπη, Iotape) is a historical port city that is 30 km-33 km, east of Alanya, located in the Mediterranean Region, Turkey. Along with Alanya, Aytap is situated in the district of the Antalya Province. Where Aytap is situated there is a long modern road that stretches along the coast between Alanya and Gazipaşa. Aytap is situated between Alanya and Gazipaşa. Nowadays, Aytap is a popular tourist place. The city is popular for camping; swimming in the natural caves; swimming and using the local beaches or if tourists come to visit the ancient ruins.

== History ==
Prior to the 1st century, there is no archaeological evidence found that Aytap could have been earlier inhabited by other clans of people. The city was founded by the King Antiochus IV of Commagene, who was of Armenian, Greek and Median descent. Antiochus IV founded this settlement around 52 and named the city in honor of his late sister-wife, Queen of Commagene Iotapa, who was Queen from 38 until her death around 52 of Commagene.

Antiochus IV chose this site to establish the city, because there are 2 bays close to each other, giving shape of a natural harbor with a higher plateau for the town to be protected from the sea and any invasions from the sea. The natural port measures 50–100 metres. The peninsula between the 2 bays is on a high hill, which is connected to land and extends to the sea. In the peninsula, ruins remains of an Acropolis. Huge walls were built around the Acropolis to protect the monument. It is known during the reign of Antiochus IV, 38–72, in some cities in Cilicia, including Iotapa, mints were producing coins honoring Antiochus’ sons with Iotapa, princes Gaius Julius Archelaus Antiochus Epiphanes and Callinicus. These mints were producing coins honoring Iotapa, years after her death.

Although Iotapa was annexed along with the Kingdom of Commagene by Roman Emperor Vespasian in 72, Iotapa became a central city where coins were minted. From the reign of Trajan (98-117) until the reign of Valerian (253-260), coins were minted at Iotapa. Surviving coins from the mint, on the front side shows the bust of an emperor and backside there is a description of either Apollo, Tyche or Perseus.

== Archaeological remains ==
In Aytap, there are archaeological remains from the reign of Antiochus IV, Ancient Rome and Byzantine Empire. The ancient ruins are near the modern road. In Aytap, there are remains of the Ancient Roman sewers, which are well preserved. In the northern hills of Aytap, there is a necropolis (see List of necropoleis). There are monumental tombs and beside them are small tomb structures covered with vaults.

In the old street of Aytap there are well preserve remains of the local Roman Baths. There are crepes consisting of three steps and surviving sculptures. Inscriptions on sculptures have survived about local athletes and local citizens. East of the local Acropolis, there is a Basilica in a rectangular shape with three naves. Ruins of a temple have been found in the modern city centre that is 8 m x 12.5 m long, with traces of surviving frescoes.

== Sources ==
- https://web.archive.org/web/20150812083730/http://cheaphotelturkey.com/alanyaturkey.asp
- http://www.famous-tour.com/english/LOCATIONS/alanya.htm
- https://web.archive.org/web/20080924090628/http://www.bilyanatravel.com/?page=106&destina=4&lang=uk
- https://web.archive.org/web/20090106015143/http://www.turkeytourism.com/holiday/akdeniz/alanya/resorts.htm
- https://web.archive.org/web/20080829184156/http://www.turkeyodyssey.com/articles/the-port-city-of-iotape-aytap.html
- http://www.turizm.gov.tr/EN/Yonlendir.aspx?17A16AE30572D3137EE1F1486EE5030E9BCFDA0A07D3F364
