= Antiochus III of Commagene =

King of Commagene from 12 BC to 17 AD

Antiochus III

King of Commagene
- Reign: 12 BC – 17 AD (29 years)
- Predecessor: Mithridates III
- Successor: Antiochus IV
- Died: 17 AD
- Spouse: Princess Iotapa of Commagene
- Issue: Antiochus IV of Commagene; Julia Iotapa, Queen of Commagene
Names
- Antiochus III Epiphanes
- House: Orontid dynasty
- Father: King Mithridates III of Commagene
- Mother: Princess Iotapa of Media Atropatene

Antiochus III Epiphanes (Greek: Ἀντίοχος ὀ Ἐπιφανής, flourished 1st century BC and 1st century AD) was the ruler of the Kingdom of Commagene from 12 BC to 17 AD. He was the son and successor of King Mithridates III of Commagene and Iotapa, and of mixed Iranian, Armenian, Greek and Median descent – the last through his mother. His parents were first cousins.

When Antiochus died in 17 AD, his death created major issues for the kingdom, which was in political turmoil at the time. The reasons for this situation are unclear, but it may have been the consequence of his children, Antiochus and Iotapa, being too young to succeed their father. This may have meant that there was no effective authority to prevent civil unrest and unite the citizens of Commagene.

== Career ==
Very little is known on his life and his reign as King. After Antiochus' death, two factions appeared: One faction was led by noblemen, who wanted Commagene to be placed under the rule of the Roman Empire; the other was led by citizens who wanted Commagene's independence to be retained under the rule of their own king.

Both factions sent embassies to Rome, seeking the advice and assistance of Emperor Tiberius to decide the future of Commagene. Tiberius decided to make Commagene a part of the Roman province of Syria. That decision was welcomed by many of the citizens by Commagene, which remained under Roman rule until Caligula restored the kingdom to Antiochus’ children in 38 AD.

== Legacy ==
Antiochus III and his son are honoured on the Philopappos Monument in Athens, Greece, dedicated to his great-grandson, Prince Gaius Julius Antiochus Epiphanes Philopappos, who was a prominent and respected citizen in Athens. In the left figure of the monument is a statue of Antiochus III's son, Antiochus IV. Below Antiochus IV is an inscription that states King Antiochus son of King Antiochus.

== Sources ==
- Babaie, Sussan; Grigor, Talinn (2015). Persian Kingship and Architecture: Strategies of power in Iran from the Achaemenids to the Pahlavis. I.B.Tauris. pp. 1–288. ISBN 9780857734778.
- Chahin, Mark (2001). The Kingdom of Armenia. Routledge. pp. 190–191. ISBN 0-7007-1452-9.
- Erskine, Andrew; Llewellyn-Jones, Lloyd; Wallace, Shane (2017). The Hellenistic Court: Monarchic Power and Elite Society from Alexander to Cleopatra. The Classical Press of Wales. ISBN 978-1910589625.
- Garsoian, Nina (2005). "Tigran II". Encyclopaedia Iranica.
- Marciak, Michał (2017). Sophene, Gordyene, and Adiabene: Three regna minora of northern Mesopotamia between east and west. Brill. ISBN 9789004350724.
- Sartre, Maurice (2005). The Middle East under Rome. Harvard University Press. ISBN 9780674016835.
- Tacitus. "Chapter 4, First treason trials". The Annals. Vol. Part One: Tiberius.
