= Iotapa (spouse of Antiochus III) =

Queen of Commagene, daughter of King Mithridates III

- Queen of Commagene
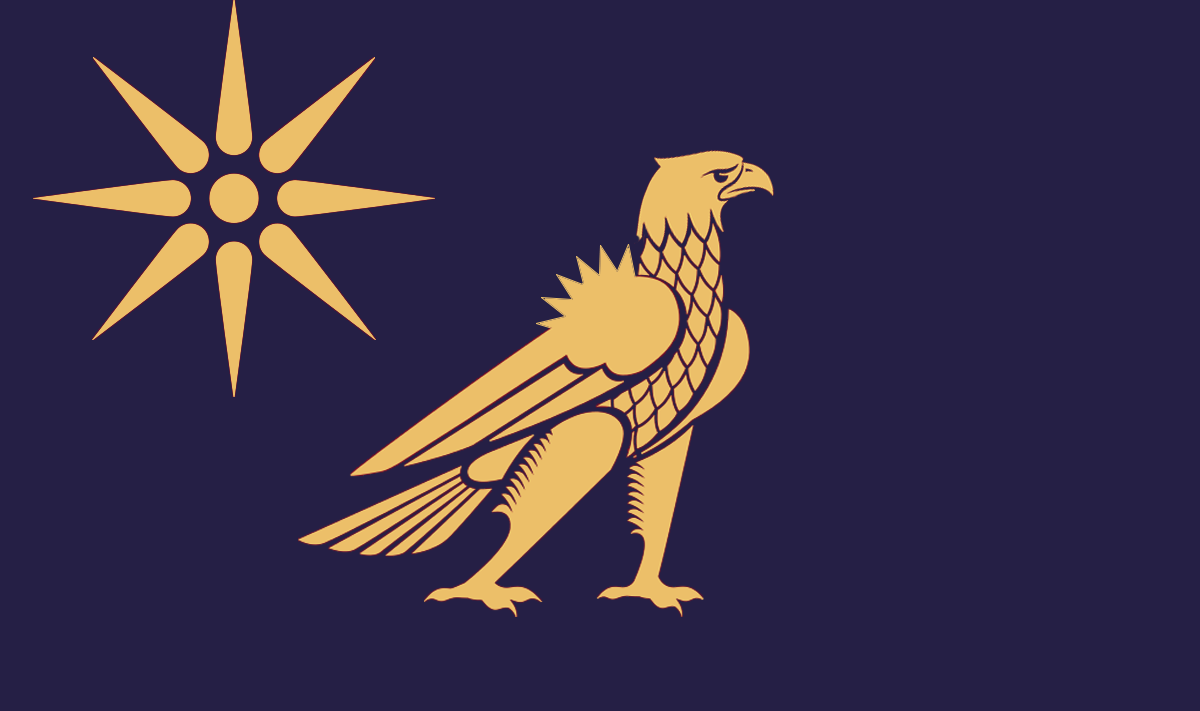
- Flag of the Kingdom of Commagene, where she reigned as queen
- Born: c. 20 BC; Samosata, Kingdom of Commagene
- Died: after 17 AD; Unknown
- Spouse: Antiochus III of Commagene
- Issue: Antiochus IV of Commagene, Princess Iotapa
- House: Herodian dynasty
- Father: Mithridates III of Commagene
- Mother: Iotapa of Commagene
- Religion: Syncretic Greco-Iranian religion

Iotapa (born c. 20 BC) was a daughter of King Mithridates III of Commagene. She reigned as Queen of Commagene after marrying her King brother Antiochus III.

== Biography ==
Iotapa was a princess from the Kingdom of Commagene who lived in the second half of the 1st century BC and the first half of the 1st century AD. She was the daughter of King Mithridates III of Commagene and Queen Iotapa of Commagene. Ethnically, she was of Armenian, Greek and Median descent.

Iotapa was most probably born, raised and educated in Samosata, the capital of the Kingdom of Commagene. Her brother was Antiochus III of Commagene, whom she married. When her father died in 12 BC, her brother succeeded their father as King of Commagene. Iotapa and Antiochus III reigned as the last independent rulers of Commagene. Through her marriage to her brother, she had two children: a son, prince Antiochus IV of Commagene and a daughter, princess Iotapa.

Antiochus III died in 17 AD; his death became unsettling for the kingdom. At the time of Antiochus' death, Commagene was in political turmoil as their children were too young to succeed their father and there was no authority to prevent civil unrest and unite the citizens of Commagene. Following the death of Antiochus III, two factions had appeared: one faction led by noblemen who wanted Commagene to be placed under the rule of the Roman Empire, and the other faction led by the citizens who wanted to retain the rule of the King.

The political factions from Commagene had both sent embassies to Rome, seeking the advice and assistance of the Roman emperor Tiberius, to decide the future of Commagene. When the political factions addressed the Emperor regarding the future of Commagene, they recognised the political reality of Roman rule and were prepared to live with the decision that Tiberius made. They were also prepared to live in the rule of the Roman Empire. The sending of the embassies to Rome marked the end of the independence of Commagene.

Tiberius decided to make Commagene a part of the Roman province of Syria. The decision that Tiberius made was welcomed by many citizens by Commagene, but some, particularly those who were supporters of the royal family, were unhappy with this outcome. The whereabouts of Iotapa after the annexation of Commagene are unknown. Her children were raised and lived in Rome. In 38 AD, the Roman Emperor Caligula restored the kingdom to her children.

== See also ==
- Iotapa (disambiguation)
- Endogamy (she married her brother).

== Sources ==
- Mavors.org – Commagene
- Tacitus – Annals of Imperial Rome, Part One: Tiberius, Chapter 4, First Treason Trials.
- Roller, Duane W. (1998). The Building Program of Herod the Great. University of California Press. ISBN 0-520-20934-6.
- Chahin, Mark (2001). The Kingdom of Armenia. Routledge. pp. 190–191. ISBN 0-7007-1452-9.
