= Tiberius Julius =

Several ancient Roman males with the family name Julius had Tiberius as their first name (praenomen).

- Tiberius Julius Abdes Pantera (c. 22 BC–40 AD), a Roman-Phoenician soldier born in Sidon
- Tiberius Julius Alexander (fl. 1st century), procurator of Judea c. 46–48, prefect of Egypt 66–69, and Roman general during the First Romano–Jewish War
- Tiberius Julius Balbillus, Emesene aristocrat who served as a priest of the cult of Elagabalus
- Tiberius Julius Candidus Marius Celsus was a Roman senator who lived during the Flavian dynasty.
- Tiberius Julius Celsus Polemaeanus (c. 45 CE – before c. 120 CE), an Ancient Greek military commander and politician of the Roman Empire
- Tiberius Julius Lupus (died AD 73), praefectus or governor of Roman Egypt from 71 to 73
- Tiberius Julius Mithridates (fl. 41 AD, died 68 AD), a Roman client king of the Bosporus
- Tiberius Julius Pollienus Auspex (fl. 3rd century AD), a Roman senator who was appointed suffect consul between AD 212 and 222
