= Ptolemaeus of Commagene =

Satrap of Commagene from 163 to 130 BC

Ptolemaeus

Epistates of Samosata (or) Eparch of Commagene
- Reign: c. 163/150 BC

Dynast of Commagene
- Reign: c. 163/150 BC – c. 130 BC
- Successor: Sames II Theosebes Dikaios
- Issue: Sames II Theosebes Dikaios
- Dynasty: Orontid dynasty
- Father: Unknown possibly Mithridates, nephew of Antiochus III possibly Orontes IV of Greater Armenia

Ptolemy (Greek: Πτολεμαῖος; also Ptolemaeus) was a Seleucid official who became the first independent ruler of Commagene. He belonged to, or claimed descent from, the Orontid dynasty, an Iranian dynasty which had long dominated the region and traced its lineage to the Achaemenid satraps of Armenia. Though he never formally assumed the title of king during his lifetime, he is regarded as the founder of the Kingdom of Commagene and is listed among the paternal ancestors of Antiochus I of Commagene at Nemrud Dağ. His father is unknown; his paternal grandfather is recorded in the Nemrud Dağ inscriptions as Arsames I, king of Sophene.

== Seleucid Commagene ==
Commagene had long been dominated by the Orontid dynasty, which traced its lineage to the Achaemenid satraps of Armenia. Following the death of Xerxes of Sophene and his subsequent reorganization of Armenia, Antiochus III separated Commagene from the western Armenian Kingdom of Sophene and constituted it as a distinct Seleucid administrative unit at some point before the outbreak of the Roman–Seleucid war (192–188 BC). A fragment of Memnon of Heraclea refers to Antiochos III during this conflict as "king of Syria, Commagene and Judaea."

The Peace of Apamea (188 BC) was a catastrophic blow to the Seleucid state. Antiochos III was compelled to surrender all territories west of the Taurus Mountains, effectively ceding Asia Minor, including Lycia, Phrygia, and much of Cilicia, to Rome's allies Pergamon and Rhodes, and to pay a crushing indemnity of fifteen thousand talents, surrender his fleet, and hand over his war elephants. Sophene and Greater Armenia were recognized as independent kingdoms by the Roman Senate, severing the Seleucid land connection to Pontic Cappadocia and Lesser Armenia. Commagene, lying east of the Taurus, remained within the shrunken Seleucid sphere.

The precise nature of Seleucid administrative organization in Commagene during this period is unclear. Seleucid satrapies were composed of smaller units called eparchies, which functioned as satrapies in miniature, each governed by an eparch. Commagene was in all likelihood itself an eparchy, as suggested by its name: the suffix -ene was the typical form for a Seleucid eparchy name.

== Career ==
Diodorus Siculus describes Ptolemaeus as an epistates, a title that, in Hellenistic usage, denoted a royal official overseeing a city's administration. As the king's representative, they were responsible for maintaining peace, supervising local Greek and native populations, ensuring that royal decrees were implemented, and collecting tax revenues. Some historians have suggested that epistates in Diodorus may be a transmission error for eparchos, which would make Ptolemaeus the governor of Commagene, rather than the overseer of its principal city.

The conventional date for Commagenian independence is 163/162 BC, derived from the placement of the relevant Diodorus fragment before the account of the rebellion of Timarchus against the Seleucid king Demetrius (162/1 BC). If a date of 163/162 BC is accepted, then Ptolemaeus likely seized on the simultaneous deaths of Zariadres of Sophene and Antiochus IV Epiphanes, along with Rome's broader destabilising influence on the Seleucid state, to detach Commagene from the empire and extend its borders. However, the fragments of Diodorus Book XXXI survive only in excerpts that cannot be trusted to be in perfect order. A later date for Commagene's independence, 150 BC, has been championed by some recent scholars on the basis of numismatic evidence.

The first imitation Demetrius coins of Commagene are dated to 153/2 BC, coinciding with the activities of Alexander Balas in Cilicia, where Heracleides, brother of the recently suppressed rebel Timarchus, had installed him as a pretender. Balas's revolt threatened to spread eastward and sever Seleucid Syria from the Upper Satrapies at the Euphrates crossing at Zeugma, a strategy Timarchus himself had recently attempted. Jakobsson proposes that Demetrius, responding to Alexander Balas' bid for the Seleucid throne, levied troops in Commagene and established a makeshift mint at Samosata using dies based on those of Antioch and bullion from nearby Seleucid supplies, placing Ptolemaeus, as epistates of Samosata, in charge of the operation. Against the traditional 163/162 BC date it is also notable that other Seleucid officials who rebelled, Molon, Achaeus the Younger, Timarchus, issued royal coinage in their own names to assert their claims; the absence of any such coinage from Ptolemaeus is difficult to explain if he had been independent for over a decade before the Demetrius imitations begin. Following the revised chronology, following Demetrius' was defeated and death at the hands of Balas in 150 BC, Ptolemaeus asseted Commagene's independence. By continuing to strike posthumous Demetrius imitations, he defied the legitimacy of Alexander Balas while maintaining the preexisting Seleucid monetary system. However, without access to Seleucid bullion supplies, the coinage rapidly deteriorated: weights were reduced, metal debased, and coin legends and portraits quickly barbarized in what was a remote and barely Hellenized province.

Samosata, as the only significant city in Commagene, served as its capital. Ptolemaeus soon moved to expand his territory, invading Melitene, a fertile district in the upper Euphrates region then a part of the Cappadocian Kingdom. He initially occupied several strategic positions before being forced to withdraw into his own province when Ariarathes marched against him with a superior force. The ay have been an attempt to cultivate the image of the victorious king central to Hellenistic monarchy.

It is unlikely Ptolemaeus was styled himself as a king during his lifetime. The absence of a royal designation on his coinage suggests he remained within the Seleucid orbit throughout his reign, governing Commagene as an autonomous but nominally subordinate dependency. The single reference to him as basileus appears in a damaged inscription from Gerger (ancient Arsameia on the Euphrates) and is considered a later honorific attribution by his descendant Antiochus I rather than a contemporary designation.

== Family ==
Ptolemaeus was a relative to King Mithridates I of Parthia. Also, according to fragments of inscribed reliefs found at Mount Nemrut, archaeologists have discovered that Ptolemaeus was a descendant of King Darius I of Persia. Ptolemaeus died in 130 BC and his wife is unknown. His son and successor was Sames II Theosebes Dikaios.

== Sources ==
- Babaie, Sussan; Grigor, Talinn (2015). Persian Kingship and Architecture: Strategies of Power in Iran from the Achaemenids to the Pahlavis. I.B.Tauris. pp. 1–288. ISBN 9780857734778.
- Canepa, Matthew (2010). "Achaemenid and Seleukid Royal Funerary Practices and Middle Iranian Kingship". In Börm, Henning; Weisehöfer, Josef (eds.). Commutatio et Contentio: Studies in the Late Roman, Sasanian, and Early Islamic Near East in Memory of Zeev Rubin. Dusseldorf: Wellem. pp. 1–21.
- Kaizer, Ted, ed. (2022). A Companion to the Hellenistic and Roman Near East. John Wiley & Sons.
- Erskine, Andrew; Llewellyn-Jones, Lloyd; Wallace, Shane (2017). The Hellenistic Court: Monarchic Power and Elite Society from Alexander to Cleopatra. The Classical Press of Wales. ISBN 978-1910589625.
- Garsoian, Nina (2005). "Tigran II". Encyclopaedia Iranica.
- Marciak, Michał (2017). Sophene, Gordyene, and Adiabene: Three Regna Minora of Northern Mesopotamia Between East and West. BRILL. ISBN 9789004350724.
- Sartre, Maurice (2005). The Middle East Under Rome. Harvard University Press. ISBN 9780674016835.
