= Mithridates III of Commagene =

King of Commagene from 20 to 12 BC

Mithridates III
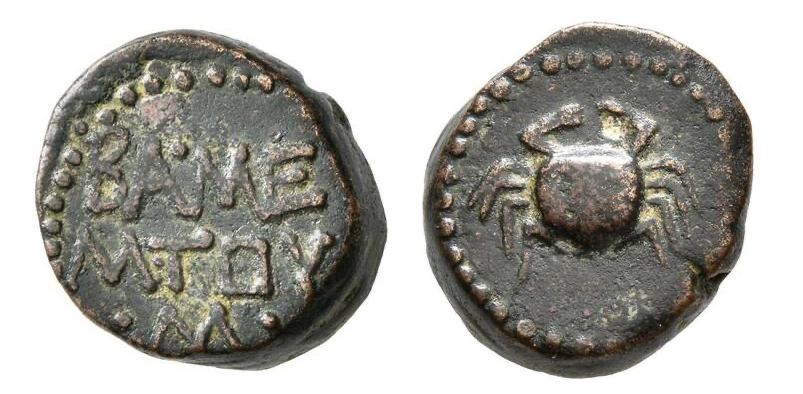
- Potential issue of Mithridates III according to Alram

King of Commagene
- Reign: 20 BC – 12 BC (8 years)
- Predecessor: Mithridates II
- Successor: Antiochus III
- Died: 12 BC
- Issue: Aka II of Commagene; Antiochus III of Commagene; Iotapa, Queen of Emesa; Iotapa, Queen of Commagene
Names
- Mithridates III Antiochus Epiphanes
- House: Orontid dynasty
- Father: Mithridates II of Commagene

Mithridates III Antiochus Epiphanes (Greek: Μιθριδάτης Ἀντίοχος ὀ Ἐπιφανής, flourished 1st century BC) was a prince who served as a King of Commagene.

== Biography ==
Mithridates III was the son and successor of King Mithridates II of Commagene. He was of Iranian and Greek descent.

Mithridates III, sometime after 30 BC, had married his paternal cousin Iotapa, a Princess of Media Atropatene who was a daughter of Artavasdes I of Media Atropatene.

Iotapa bore Mithridates III one son called Antiochus III and two daughters both called Iotapa. One daughter called Iotapa married King Sampsiceramus II of Emesa, Syria and another Iotapa, later married and ruled with her brother Antiochus III.

When Mithridates III's father died in 20 BC, he succeeded his father. He reigned as king between 20 BC–12 BC. Very little is known on his life and his reign. When he died in 12 BC, Antiochus III of Commagene became King.

== Sources ==
- Babaie, Sussan; Grigor, Talinn (2015). Persian Kingship and Architecture: Strategies of Power in Iran from the Achaemenids to the Pahlavis. I.B.Tauris. pp. 1–288. ISBN 9780857734778.
- Erskine, Andrew; Llewellyn-Jones, Lloyd; Wallace, Shane (2017). The Hellenistic Court: Monarchic Power and Elite Society from Alexander to Cleopatra. The Classical Press of Wales. ISBN 978-1910589625.
- Garsoian, Nina (2005). "Tigran II". In Yarshater, Ehsan (ed.). Encyclopædia Iranica (Online ed.). Encyclopædia Iranica Foundation.
- Marciak, Michał (2017). Sophene, Gordyene, and Adiabene: Three Regna Minora of Northern Mesopotamia Between East and West. BRILL. ISBN 9789004350724.
- Sartre, Maurice (2005). The Middle East Under Rome. Harvard University Press. ISBN 9780674016835.
