= Julia Iotapa (daughter of Antiochus III) =

1st century AD Queen of Commagene

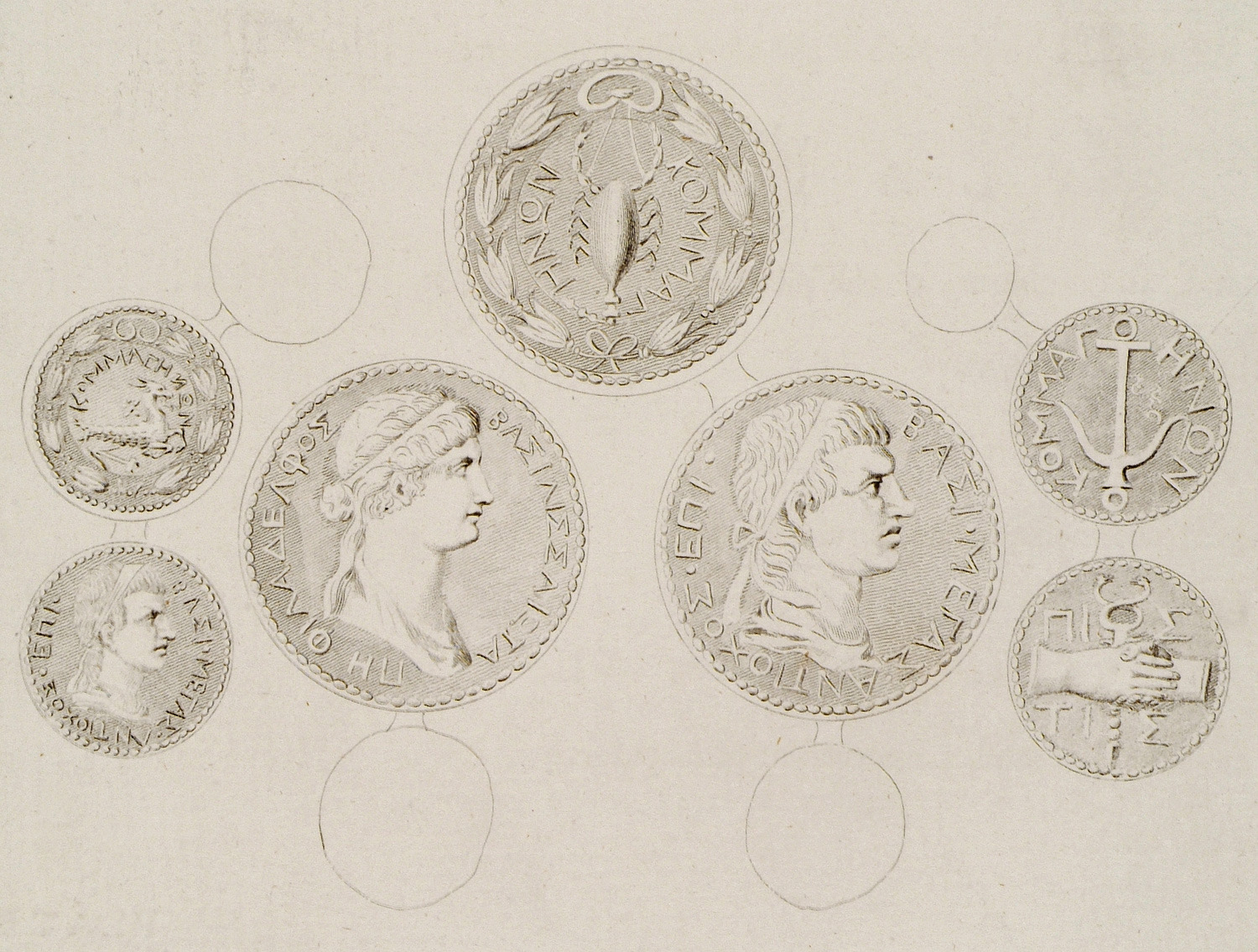
- Coins of Antiochus IV Epiphanes of Commagene and his wife Julia Iotapa

Queen of Commagene
- Predecessor: Sames II Theosebes Dikaios
- Successor: Antiochus I Theos of Commagene
- Spouse: Antiochus IV of Commagene
- Issue: Prince Gaius; Prince Callinicus; Iotapa, Queen of Cetis
- Dynasty: Orontid dynasty
- Father: Antiochus III of Commagene
- Mother: Iotapa (spouse of Antiochus III)

Julia Iotapa, or simply Iotapa (Greek: Ίουλία Ιοτάπα; before 17 – around 52), daughter of King Antiochus III of Commagene, was Queen of Commagene, consort of her King brother Antiochus IV.

== Biography ==
Iotapa was the daughter of the late King Antiochus III of Commagene and Queen Iotapa of Commagene. Her parents were full-blooded siblings who had married each other. She was of Armenian, Greek and Median descent. Through her ancestor from Commagene, Queen Laodice VII Thea, who was the mother of King Antiochus I Theos of Commagene, she was a direct descendant of the monarchs from the Greek Syrian Kingdom, the Seleucid Empire.

She was the sister of later King Antiochus IV of Commagene. Iotapa and her brother appeared to be very young, when their father died in 17.

Roman Emperor Tiberius agreed with the citizens of Commagene to make their Kingdom a part of the Roman province of Syria. From 17 until 38, Iotapa seems that she had gained Roman citizenship. Iotapa would have put the Latin name Julia, as a part of her name. She had lived and was raised in Rome, along with her brother.

While Iotapa and Antiochus were growing up in Rome, they were a part of the remarkable court of Antonia Minor. Antonia Minor was a niece of the first Roman Emperor Augustus and the youngest daughter of triumvir Mark Antony. Antonia Minor was a very influential woman and supervised her circle of various princes and princesses. Her circle assisted in the political preservation of the Roman Empire's borders and affairs of the client states.

The Roman Emperor Caligula returned to Iotapa and Antiochus IV their paternal dominion in 38. In addition, the emperor even enlarged their territory with a part of Cilicia bordering on the seacoast. Caligula also gave them one million gold pieces, the whole amount of the revenues of Commagene during the twenty years that it had been under a Roman province. The reasons for providing a client kingdom with such vast resources remain unclear; it was perhaps a stroke of Caligula's well-attested eccentricity.

Iotapa had married her brother and became Roman Client Monarchs of Commagene. Iotapa and Antiochus IV had three children:

- Son and prince: Gaius Julius Archelaus Antiochus Epiphanes. Through him they would become paternal grandparents to Philopappos who was a prominent citizen of Athens and poet Julia Balbilla.
- Son and prince: Callinicus
- Daughter and princess: Iotapa

Julia Iotapa appeared to have died before Commagene was annexed by Roman Emperor Vespasian in 72. When she died, Antiochus IV in her honor founded a town called Iotapa (modern Aytap, Turkey). On coinage her royal title is in Greek ‘ΒΑΣΙΛΙΣΣΑ ΙΩΤΑΠΗ ΦΙΛΑΔΕΛΦΟΣ’, ‘of Queen Iotape Philadelphus’. The title Philadelphus reveals to us that she is the sister-wife of Antiochus IV. This also shows her descent and claim to the Royal Cult that was established by her late ancestor Antiochus I.

== Sources ==
- Cassius Dio, lix. 8
- Suetonius, Caligula, 16
- Mavors.org - Commagene
- Smith, Dictionary of Greek and Roman Biography and Mythology, page 194
- Smith, Dictionary of Greek and Roman Biography and Mythology, page 614
- The Building Program of Herod the Great, By Duane W. Roller, Published by University of California Press 1998, ISBN 0-520-20934-6
- Chahin, Mark (2001). The Kingdom of Armenia. Routledge, pp. 190–191. ISBN 0-7007-1452-9
- Nikos Kokkinos (1992). Antonia Augusta: portrait of a great Roman lady. Psychology Press. p. 25. ISBN 9780415080293.

== See also ==
- Iotapa (disambiguation)
