= Gaius Julius Archelaus Antiochus Epiphanes =

Prince of the Kingdom of Commagene (38 AD-92 AD)

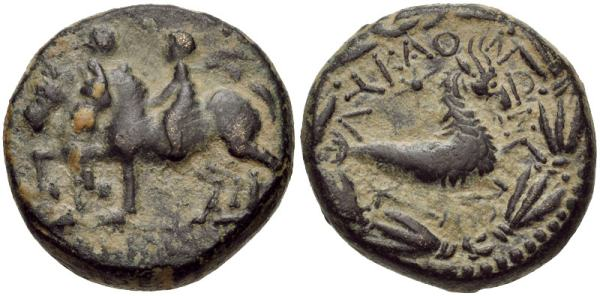

Gaius Julius Archelaus Antiochus Epiphanes, also known as Julius Archelaus Epiphanes; Epiphanes; Gaius Julius Antiochus Epiphanes or simply known as Gaius (Greek: Γάιος Ἰούλιος Ἀρχέλαος Ἀντίοχος Ἐπιφανής, 38-92 AD) was an influential prince of the Kingdom of Commagene, who lived in the 1st century.

== Biography ==
Epiphanes was the first-born son and child to King Antiochus IV of Commagene and Queen Iotapa of Commagene. His parents were full-blooded siblings. His parents were Roman Client Monarchs of Commagene who lived under the Roman Empire in the 1st century. His younger siblings were prince Callinicus and princess Iotapa.

He was of Armenian, Greek and Median descent. Through his ancestor from Commagene, Queen Laodice VII Thea, who was the mother of King Antiochus I Theos of Commagene, he was a direct descendant of the Greek Syrian Kingdom, the Seleucid Empire. He was most probably born in Samosata, the capital of the Kingdom of Commagene, or in Rome. However, he was raised and educated between Rome and Samosata. His mother died around 52 and his father raised him. Epiphanes was named in honor of his father, his ancestors and the late Roman Client King Archelaus of Cilicia.

Antiochus IV was an ally to the Roman Emperors and various members of the Herodian Dynasty. Epiphanes was betrothed in 43/44 to the princess Drusilla, who was a daughter of Judean King Agrippa I. Agrippa thought that Epiphanes would embrace Judaism and Jewish customs. However, Epiphanes never married Drusilla because he refused to adopt the customs and religion of the Jews. The marriage between Epiphanes and Drusilla had not been contracted on the death of Agrippa I.

In 64, Epiphanes had married an Egyptian Greek woman from Alexandria called Claudia Capitolina. Capitolina came from a distinguished family. She was the only child of Tiberius Claudius Balbilus by his wife, whose name is unknown. Balbilus was an Egyptian Greek who was one of the highest magistrates of Equestrian rank in Rome. Balbilus was an astrologer, a learned scholar who was later prefect of Egypt. Capitolina was distantly related to Epiphanes. Capitolina's paternal grandmother princess Aka II of Commagene was a direct descendant of King Antiochus I Theos of Commagene, as she was a great-granddaughter of Antiochus I Theos.

Capitolina is not mentioned by Roman sources, however she has been identified as the wife of Epiphanes and mother of Epiphanes’ children, through surviving honorific inscriptions and poetry dedicated to her. After Epiphanes married Capitolina, they settled and lived in the court of Antiochus IV. In 65 Capitolina bore Epiphanes their first son and child, Gaius Julius Antiochus Epiphanes Philopappos in Samosata.

In 70 Epiphanes was sent by his father with troops to command and assist the prince Titus to end the siege in Jerusalem. During this war, Epiphanes had met the Roman Jewish historian Josephus. The Roman Emperor Vespasian had stated then that the Kingdom of Commagene was one of the richest of the tributary kings.

In 72 Lucius Caesennius Paetus, the Roman Governor of Syria had sent letters addressed to Vespasian accusing Antiochus IV, Epiphanes and his brother Callinicus in planning to revolt against Rome and allying themselves with the King of Parthia. Paetus had accused Antiochus IV, Epiphanes and Callinicus of disloyalty to the Emperor in these letters. It is not known whether these accusations were true or false. After reading the letters, Vespasian felt that he could longer trust the family of Antiochus IV and could not trust them to protect the strategic crossing at the Euphrates River at Samosata. Vespasian gave orders to Antiochus IV to terminate his rule in Commagene.

Paetus invaded the Kingdom of Commagene, as head of the Legio VI Ferrata. The client Kings Aristobulus of Chalcis and Sohaemus of Emesa also supplied troops to Paetus. They all arrived the night before the battle. As Epiphanes and Callinicus prepared themselves that night for war, Antiochus IV was preparing to flee to Cilicia.

The morning that the war was supposed to occur, Epiphanes, his family and Callinicus, out of fear of the Romans, fled to the King of Parthia, while Antiochus IV also out of fear of the Romans fled to Cilicia. There is a possibility that Epiphanes and Callinicus had a short-lived attempt to resist invasion, before they fled to Parthia.

The family of Antiochus IV had let their own army and the citizens of Commagene down. Antiochus IV and his family never considered a war with Rome and they wanted to clear themselves of these accusations. Vespasian brought Epiphanes, with his family and Callinicus, peacefully back to Rome with an honourable Roman military escort. Epiphanes lived in Rome with his family and Callinicus, and Antiochus IV, for the remainder of his life. Vespasian had given Antiochus IV and his family sufficient revenue on which to live. Antiochus IV and his family had a glamorous life and were treated with great respect.

They never returned to Commagene, which was reinstated again as a part of the Roman Province of Syria and there the citizens still proved to be loyal subjects of the Roman Empire.

In 72 Capitolina bore Epiphanes another child, a daughter named Julia Balbilla in Rome. After the death of his father, Epiphanes and his family moved and finally settled in Athens Greece, where he died in 92. It is unknown whether Callinicus had travelled with them.

After his death, Capitolina returned and lived her remaining years in Alexandria, while her son remained in Athens where he became a prominent citizen. His daughter Julia Balbilla became a prominent poet and became a travelling friend to the Roman Emperor Hadrian and his wife the Empress Vibia Sabina. In a surviving poem written by Balbilla dedicated to the memory of her parents and her grandfathers, Balbilla describes her parents as ‘pious’ people and writes very highly of her ancestry.

== Sources ==
- Josephus, Jewish War, v. 11. § 3
- Josephus, Jewish War, vii. 7
- Josephus, Jewish Antiquities, xix. 9. § 1
- Josephus, Jewish Antiquities, xx.7.1
- Tacitus, Histories, ii. 81.
- Tacitus, Histories, v. 1.
- "Encyclopaedia of the Hellenic World, Asia Minor". www2.ehw.gr.
- Chahin, Mark, The Kingdom of Armenia, Routledge, 2001, pp. 190–191. ISBN 0-7007-1452-9
- Hemelrijk, Emily Ann, Matrona Docta: Educated Women in the Roman Elite from Cornelia to Julia Domna (Routledge, 1999), pp. 188ff
- Schwartz, Seth, Josephus and Judaean Politics, (Brill, 1990).
- Speidel, Michael Alexander, "Early Roman Rule in Commagene", Scripta Classica Israelica, 24 (2005), pp. 85-100
