= Lucius Caesennius Paetus =

1st century AD Roman senator and governor

Lucius Junius Caesennius Paetus (c. 20 - 72?) was a Roman senator, and member of the gens Caesennia and Junia, who held several offices in the emperor's service. He was consul ordinarius for the year 61 as the colleague of Publius Petronius Turpilianus. Judith Ginsburg notes this made him the first novus homo to reach the ordinary consulship since Quintus Veranius 12 years before.

== Early life ==
Paetus, also known as "Caesennius Paetus" in a number of sources, was possibly the son of Publius Caesennius Paetus, an Etruscan from Tarquinia; the "Lucius Junius" suggests he was adopted by a Lucius Junius. He may also be the great-grandson of Lucius Caesennius Lento.

== Career under Nero ==
Paetus served as a politician and general during the reigns of the emperors Nero (54-68) and Vespasian (69-79). Ginsburg surmises that Paetus achieved the consulship through the influence of a group of senators that included the families of the Vitellii and Flavii. After he stepped down from the consulate in June, Paetus departed Rome to assume the governorship of the imperial province of Cappadocia. During his governorship, the general Gnaeus Domitius Corbulo conducted Rome's war with Parthia over Armenia. In successive campaigns, Corbulo had established Roman rule over the country, and Paetus was placed in charge of defending it from Parthian counterstrokes.

Paetus resented Corbulo's talent as a general. In 62 however, Paetus, at the head of an army that included the legions XII Fulminata and IV Scythica, suffered a catastrophic defeat at the Battle of Rhandeia against the Parthian and Armenian forces of King Tiridates I of Armenia. Although relief forces headed by Corbulo were only 50 miles away, Paetus surrendered his fortified camp. He and his legions were shamed by passing under the yoke and were allowed to retreat from Armenia. After his defeat, Paetus' weak character and his incapability to command were revealed, and his military command was entrusted again to Corbulo. Charged with both incompetence and cowardice, Paetus was quickly pardoned by Nero, who dismissively commented that suspense would be harmful to someone of such timidity.

== Career under Vespasian ==
In 72, Paetus, Governor of Syria since 70, had sent letters addressed to Vespasian accusing King Antiochus IV of the client Kingdom of Commagene, together with his sons Gaius Julius Archelaus Antiochus Epiphanes and Callinicus, of planning to revolt against Rome and allying themselves with the King of Parthia. It is not known whether these accusations were true or false. After reading the letters, Vespasian felt that he could no longer trust the family of Antiochus IV with the protection of the strategic crossings of the Euphrates River at Samosata, and thus resolved to directly annex Commagene.

Paetus raided the Kingdom of Commagene at the head of Legio VI Ferrata. The client Kings Aristobulus of Chalcis and Sohaemus of Emesa also supplied troops to Paetus. The two armies encamped opposite each other, but no battle occurred, as the Commagenians were loath to confront the Roman army. Antiochus Epiphanes, his family, and Callinicus fled to Parthia, while their father, Antiochus IV, fled to Cilicia. There is, however, a possibility that Epiphanes and Callinicus made a short-lived attempt to resist invasion before fleeing to Parthia.

Antiochus IV and his family had never wanted war with Rome and they wanted to rebut these accusations. Antiochus Epiphanes, with his family and Callinicus, were brought back to Rome with an honour guard, and lived out their lives there.

Paetus' subsequent career and date of death are unknown.

== Personal life ==
Paetus married Flavia Sabina, born c. 30, the daughter of Titus Flavius Sabinus and Arrecina Clementina and paternal niece of Vespasian. Their children included two sons: the oldest was named Lucius Junius Caesennius Paetus, consul in 79; the younger Lucius Caesennius Sospes, consul in 114.

Political offices
Preceded by Gaius Velleius Paterculus, and Marcus Manilius Vopiscus as Suffect consuls	Consul of the Roman Empire; 61 with Publius Petronius Turpilianus	Succeeded by Gnaeus Pedanius Fuscus Salinator, and Lucius Velleius Paterculus as Suffect consuls
