= Callinicus (prince of Commagene) =

1st century AD prince of the Kingdom of Commagene

Callinicus (Greek: Кαλλίνικος) was a prince of the Kingdom of Commagene, who lived in the 1st century AD. Callinicus was the second-born son and child to King Antiochus IV of Commagene and Queen Iotapa of Commagene. His parents were full-blooded siblings. His parents were Roman Client Monarchs of Commagene that lived under the Roman Empire in the 1st century. His older brother was prince Gaius Julius Archelaus Antiochus Epiphanes and youngest sibling was princess Iotapa.

He was of Armenian, Greek and Median descent. Through his ancestor from Commagene, Queen Laodice VII Thea, who was the mother of King Antiochus I Theos of Commagene, he was a direct descendant of the Greek Syrian Kingdom the Seleucid Empire. Callinicus’ birth name was probably Gaius Julius Mithridates Callinicus. He was probably named in honour of his ancestor King Mithridates I Callinicus, who was the father of King Antiochus I Theos of Commagene. Callinicus is the second person in the Royal Family of Commagene to bear this name but he is simply known as Callinicus.

He was most probably born, raised and educated in Samosata, the capital of the Kingdom of Commagene. His mother died around AD 52 and his father raised him. Unfortunately, more is known on his eldest brother and younger sister, than on Callinicus.

In 72 Lucius Caesennius Paetus, the Roman Governor of Syria had sent letters addressed to Vespasian accusing Antiochus IV; Epiphanes and Callinicus in planning to revolt against Rome and allying themselves with the King of Parthia. Paetus accused in these letters that Antiochus IV, Epiphanes and Callinicus of disloyalty to the Emperor. It is not known whether if these accusations were true or false. After reading the letters, Vespasian felt that he could no longer trust the family of Antiochus IV and couldn't trust them to protect the strategic crossing at the Euphrates River at Samosata. Vespasian gave orders to Antiochus IV to terminate his rule in Commagene.

Paetus invaded the Kingdom of Commagene, as head of the Legio VI Ferrata. The client Kings Aristobulus of Chalcis and Sohaemus of Emesa also supplied troops to Paetus. They all arrived the night before the Battle. As Epiphanes and Callinicus prepared themselves that night for war, Antiochus IV was preparing to flee to Cilicia.

The next morning that the war was supposed to occur Epiphanes with his family and Callinicus out of fear of the Romans fled to the King of Parthia, while Antiochus IV also out of fear of the Romans fled to Cilicia. There is a possibility that Epiphanes and Callinicus had a short-lived attempt to resist invasion, before they fled to Parthia.

The family of Antiochus IV had let their own army and the citizens of Commagene down. Antiochus IV and his family never considered to cause a war with Rome and they wanted to clear themselves of these accusations. Vespasian brought peacefully back to Rome, Epiphanes with his family and Callinicus in an honourable Roman Military Escort. Epiphanes with his family and Callinicus lived in Rome with Antiochus IV for the remainder of his life. Vespasian had given Antiochus IV and his family sufficient revenue to live on. Antiochus IV and his family had a glamorous life and were treated with great respect.

They never returned to Commagene. Commagene was reinstated again as a part of the Roman Province of Syria and there the citizens of Commagene still proved to be loyal subjects of the Roman Empire. After the death of Antiochus IV, Epiphanes and his family moved and settled in Athens Greece. However, it is unknown whether Callinicus had travelled with them. After this moment, nothing more is known on Callinicus.

== Sources ==
- "Commagene" (PDF). mavors.org. Archived from the original (PDF) on 27 December 2015.
- Chahin, Mark (2001). The Kingdom of Armenia. Routledge. pp. 190–191. ISBN 0-7007-1452-9.
- Hemelrijk, Emily Ann (2004) [1999]. "The memoirs of the younger Agrippina". Matrona Docta: Educated women in the Roman élite from Cornelia to Julia Domna. Routledge. p. 187. ISBN 0-415-34127-2.
