= Titus Julius Balbillus =

3rd century Emesene priest of the cult of Elagabalus

Titus Julius Balbillus (flourished second half of the 2nd century and first half of the 3rd century) was an Emesene aristocrat from the Emesene dynasty in Roman Syria who served as a priest of the cult of Elagabalus (Latinized Aramaic name for the Syrian Sun God) in Rome during the reigns of the Severan emperors Septimius Severus (r. 193–211) and Caracalla (r. 211–217).

== Life ==
Although little is known on the origins of Balbillus, he was related to Tiberius Julius Balbillus, also known as Aurelius Julius Balbillus, another priest from the cult of Elagabalus in Rome. Like Tiberius Julius Balbillus, Balbillus was also a relation of the Roman empress Julia Domna and her family.

Balbillus is known from inscriptions as a priest of Elagabalus in Rome during the reigns of Septimius Severus and Caracalla, which are dated before 218. The temple based in Rome devoted to ancient Syrian deities, including Elagabalus was located in Trastevere. A priest in the cult of Elagabalus was called a sacerdos Solis, while Elagabalus's cult was called the Sol Invictus Elagabal.

The priesthood of Balbillus began at an unknown date before the end of the second century. From the surviving inscriptions, it is revealed that Balbillus enjoyed imperial favour from the Severan dynasty.

On January 15, 201, Balbillus made a dedication to the Vestal Virgin Numisia Maximilla. Five days later, on January 20, 201, Balbillus had an inscription carved in honor of Claudius Julianus, the praefectus annonum. A freedman called Eudemon showed his gratitude to Balbillus as his top patron by an inscription dedication. Balbillus as a priest, was honored as Eudemon's protector, and he expressed his gratitude on the occasion to commemorate his patron. After this moment, no more is known on Balbillus.

== Sources ==
- G. H. Halsberghe, The Cult of Sol Invictus, Brill, 1972
- J. Wacher, The Roman World. Vol. 2, Routledge, 2002
- A. R. Birley, Septimius Severus: The African Emperor, Routledge, 2002
- L. de Arrizabalaga y Prado, The Emperor Elagabalus: Fact or Fiction?, Cambridge University Press, 2010
