= Antiochus IV of Commagene =

King of Commagene from AD 38 to 72

Antiochus IV
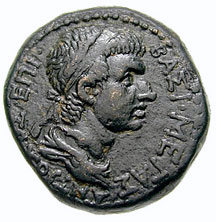
- Coin depicting Antiochus IV

King of Commagene
- Reign: AD 38 – AD 72 (34 years)
- Predecessor: Antiochus III
- Successor: None (Kingdom abolished)
- Born: before AD 17
- Died: after AD 72; Rome, Roman Empire
- Spouse: Princess Iotapa of Commagene
- Issue: Prince Gaius; Prince Callinicus; Iotapa, Queen of Cetis
Names
- Gaius Julius Antiochus IV Epiphanes
- House: Orontid dynasty
- Father: King Antiochus III of Commagene
- Mother: Princess Iotapa of Commagene

Gaius Julius Antiochus IV Epiphanes (Ancient Greek: Γάιος Ἰούλιος Ἀντίοχος ὀ Ἐπιφανής, before 17 AD – after 72 AD), the last king of Commagene, reigned between 38 and 72 as a client king to the Roman Empire. The epithet "Epiphanes" means "the Glorious".

== Life ==
Antiochus was born a prince of the royal family of Commagene. His parents King Antiochus III of Commagene and Queen Iotapa were full-blooded siblings who had married each other. The younger Antiochus himself would marry his full-blooded sister Iotapa. Antiochus was of Armenian descent. Through his ancestor from Commagene, Queen Laodice VII Thea, who was the mother of King Antiochus I of Commagene, he was a direct descendant of the Greek Seleucid kings.

Antiochus appears to have been very young when his father died in 17. The Roman emperor Tiberius agreed with the citizens of Commagene to make their kingdom a part of the Roman province of Syria. Between 17 and 38, Antiochus seems to have gained Roman citizenship. He lived and was raised in Rome, along with his sister. While he and his sister were growing up in Rome, they were part of the remarkable court of Antonia Minor, a niece of the first Roman emperor Augustus and the youngest daughter of the triumvir Mark Antony. Antonia Minor was a very influential woman and supervised her circle of various princes and princesses. Her circle assisted in the political preservation of the Roman Empire's borders and affairs of the client states.

In 38, Antiochus received his paternal dominion from Antonia's grandson, the Roman emperor Caligula. In addition, the emperor enlarged Antiochus' territory with a part of Cilicia bordering on the seacoast. Caligula also gave him the whole amount of the revenues of Commagene during the twenty years that it had been a Roman province. The reasons for providing a client king with such vast resources remain unclear; it was perhaps a stroke of Caligula's well-attested eccentricity. Antiochus was on most intimate terms with Caligula, and he and King Agrippa I are spoken of as the instructors of the emperor in the art of tyranny. This friendship, however, did not last very long, for he was subsequently deposed by Caligula.

Antiochus did not regain his kingdom till the accession of Roman Emperor Claudius in 41. In 43 his first son, C. Julius Archelaus Antiochus Epiphanes, was betrothed to Drusilla, a daughter of Agrippa I. Apart from Epiphanes, Antiochus had another two children with Iotapa: Callinicus and a younger Iotapa. In 53, Antiochus put down an insurrection of some barbarous tribes in Cilicia, called Clitae. In 55 he received orders from the Roman emperor Nero to levy troops to make war against the Parthians, and in the year 59 he served under General Cn. Domitius Corbulo against King Tiridates I of Armenia, brother of the Parthian King Vologases I of Parthia. In consequence of his services in this war, in the year 61 he obtained parts of Armenia.

He took the side of Vespasian when the latter was proclaimed Roman emperor in 70; and he is then spoken of as the richest of the tributary kings. In the same year he sent forces, commanded by his son Epiphanes, to assist prince Titus in the siege of Jerusalem. During his reign as king, he founded the following cities: Germanicopolis, Iotapa and Neronias.

Antiochus' downfall came only two years afterwards, in 72, when he was accused by L. Caesennius Paetus, the governor of Syria, of conspiring with the Parthians against the Romans. He was therefore deprived of his kingdom, after a reign of thirty-four years from his first appointment by Caligula. Antiochus' sons, the princes Epiphanes and Callinicus, fled to Parthia after a brief encounter with Roman troops. Antiochus himself retired first to Sparta and then to Rome, where he passed the remainder of his life with his sons Epiphanes and Callinicus and was treated with great respect. Among the grandchildren of Antiochus and Iotapa was the prominent Athenian citizen Philopappos who lived in Greece between the 1st and 2nd centuries.

== Coinage ==
There are several coins of this king extant, and their die-marks prove he did rule large parts of Cappadocia and Cilicia as well as Commagene proper. In one of those coins he is called ΒΑΣΙΛΕΥΣ ΜΕΓΑΣ ΑΝΤΙΟΧΟΣ ("Great King Antiochus"), a testament to his political ambitions. On the reverse of that coin a scorpion is represented, surrounded with the foliage of the laurel, and inscribed ΚΟΜΜΑΓΗΝΩΝ ("of the Commagenians"). From his coins we also learn the name of his wife, Iotapa.

== See also ==
- Aytap
