= Tiberius Julius Balbillus =

3rd century Emesene priest of the cult of Elagabalus

Tiberius Julius Balbillus also known as Julius Balbillus and Aurelius Julius Balbillus (flourished second half of the 2nd century and the first half of the 3rd century) was an Emesene aristocrat from the Emesene dynasty in Roman Syria who served as a priest of the cult of Elagabalus (Latinized Aramaic name for the Syrian Sun God) in Rome during the reigns of the Severan emperors Septimius Severus (r. 193–211) and Caracalla (r. 211–217).

== Life ==
Little is known on the origins of Balbillus; he was a direct descendant of the king Antiochus I Theos of Commagene and a relation of the Roman empress Julia Domna and her family. According to surviving inscriptions in Rome, Balbillus was a relation to Titus Julius Balbillus, another priest from the cult of Elagabalus in Rome.

Balbillus is known from inscriptions as priest of Elagabalus in Rome during the reigns of Septimius Severus and Caracalla, which are dated before 218. The temple based in Rome devoted to ancient Syrian deities, including Elagabalus was located in Trastevere. A priest in the cult of Elagabalus was called a sacerdos Solis, while Elagabalus's cult was called the Sol Invictus Elagabal.

The priesthood of Balbillus, began at an unknown date before the end of the second century. From inscriptions at the temple reveals, that Balbillus enjoyed imperial favour and established good cordial relations with the Vestal Virgins. Prior to the reign of Elagabalus, Balbillus represented the cult of Elagabalus in Rome. He probably catered the ritual needs connected with the cult of Elagabalus for Septimius Severus and Caracalla, which may have arisen among the Emesene members of the Severan household.

From a surviving inscription in Rome dated April 4, 215, Balbillus dedicated an inscription in gratitude to the Vestal Virgin Terentia Flavola for the many services she had rendered him. Despite the fact that Balbillus was a Roman citizen from the Constitutio Antoniniana in 212 Balbillus assumed the Roman nomen Aurelius as after 215, Balbillus was also known as Aurelius Julius Balbillius. After this moment, no more is known on Balbillus.

== Sources ==
- G.H. Halsberghe, The Cult of Sol Invictus, Brill, 1972
- H. Temporini & W. Haase, 2, Principat: 9, 2, Walter de Gruyter, 1978
- J. Wacher, The Roman world. Vol. 2, Routledge, 2002
- A.R. Birley, Septimius Severus: The African Emperor, Routledge, 2002
- L. de Arrizabalaga y Prado, The Emperor Elagabalus: Fact or Fiction?, Cambridge University Press, 2010
