= Commagene =

Greco-Iranian kingdom (163 BC – 72 AD)

Commagene Κομμαγηνή
- 163 BC – 72 AD
- Map showing Commagene (light pink on the left) in 50 AD; nearby are Armenia, Sophene, Osrhoene, and the Roman and Parthian Empires
- Capital: Samosata
- Common languages: Greek (official); Persian (early ruling dynasty); Aramaic (common)
- Religion: Greco-Iranian religious syncretism
- Government: Monarchy
- King
  - 163–130 BC: Ptolemaeus
  - 38–72 AD: Antiochus IV
- Historical era: Hellenistic Age
  - Established: 163 BC
  - Disestablished: 72 AD
Preceded by	Succeeded by
Kingdom of Sophene	Roman Empire
- Today part of: Turkey

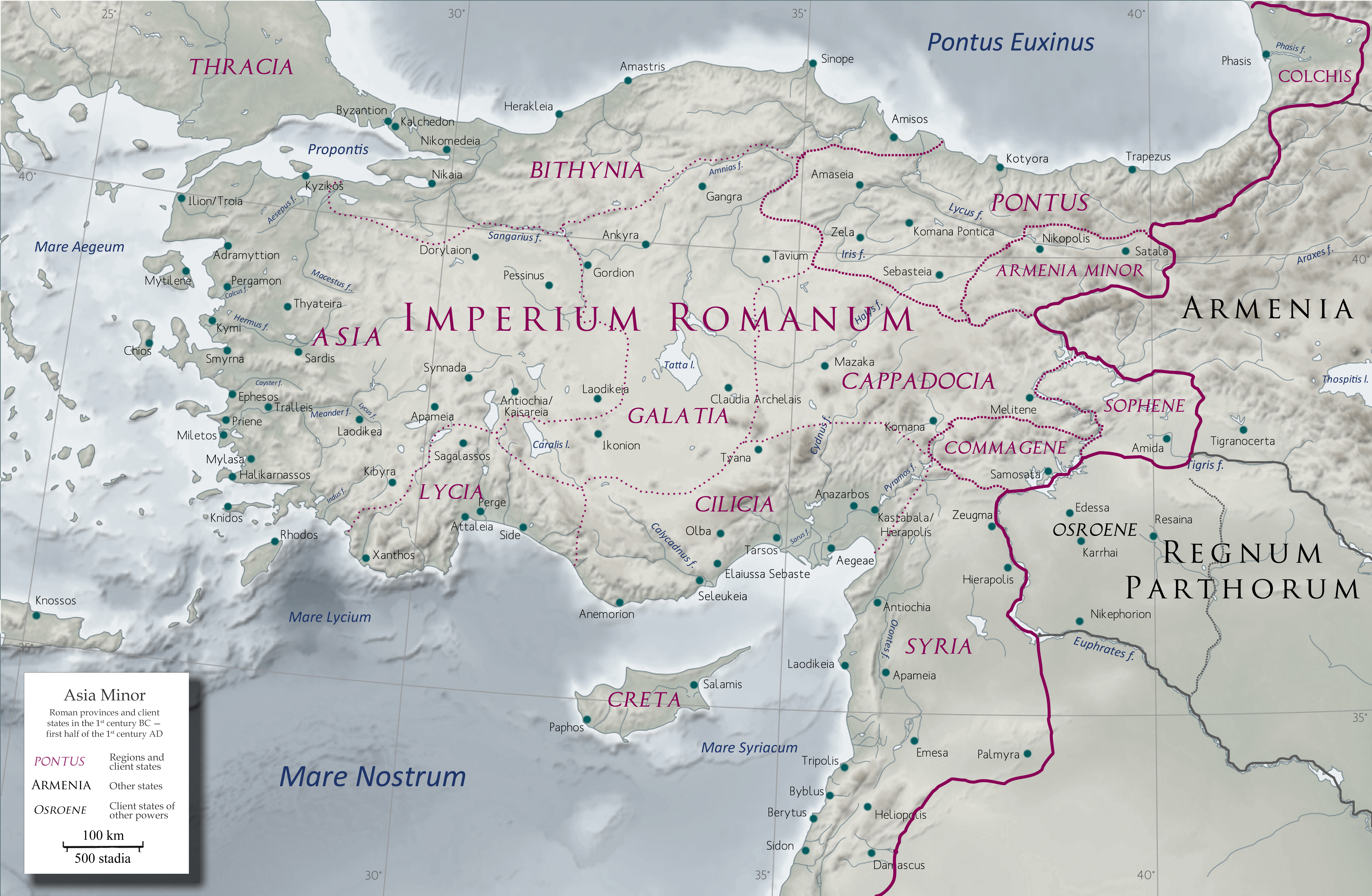
Anatolia in the early 1st century AD with Commagene as a Roman client state

Commagene (Ancient Greek: Κομμαγηνή) was an ancient Greco-Iranian kingdom ruled by a Hellenized branch of the Orontids, a dynasty of Iranian origin, that had ruled over the Satrapy of Armenia. The kingdom was located in and around the ancient city of Samosata, which served as its capital. The Iron Age name of Samosata, Kummuh, probably gives its name to Commagene.

Commagene has been characterized as a "buffer state" between Armenia, Parthia, Syria, and Rome; culturally, it was correspondingly mixed. The kings of the Kingdom of Commagene claimed descent from Orontes with Darius I of Persia as their ancestor, by his marriage to Rhodogune, daughter of Artaxerxes II who had a family descent from king Darius I. The territory of Commagene corresponded roughly to the modern Turkish provinces of Adıyaman and northern Antep.

Little is known of the region of Commagene before the beginning of the 2nd century BC. However, it seems that, from what little evidence remains, Commagene formed part of a larger state that also included the Kingdom of Sophene. This situation lasted until c. 163 BC, when the local satrap, Ptolemaeus of Commagene, established himself as an independent ruler following the death of the Seleucid king, Antiochus IV Epiphanes.

The Kingdom of Commagene maintained its independence until 17 AD, when it was made a Roman province by Emperor Tiberius. It re-emerged as an independent kingdom when Antiochus IV of Commagene was reinstated to the throne by order of Caligula, then deprived of it by that same emperor, then restored to it a couple of years later by his successor, Claudius. The re-emergent state lasted until 72 AD, when the Emperor Vespasian finally and definitively made it part of the Roman Empire.

One of the kingdom's most lasting visible remains is the archaeological site on Mount Nemrut, a sanctuary dedicated by King Antiochus Theos to a number of syncretistic Graeco-Iranian deities as well as to himself and the deified land of Commagene. It is now a World Heritage Site.

== Cultural identity ==
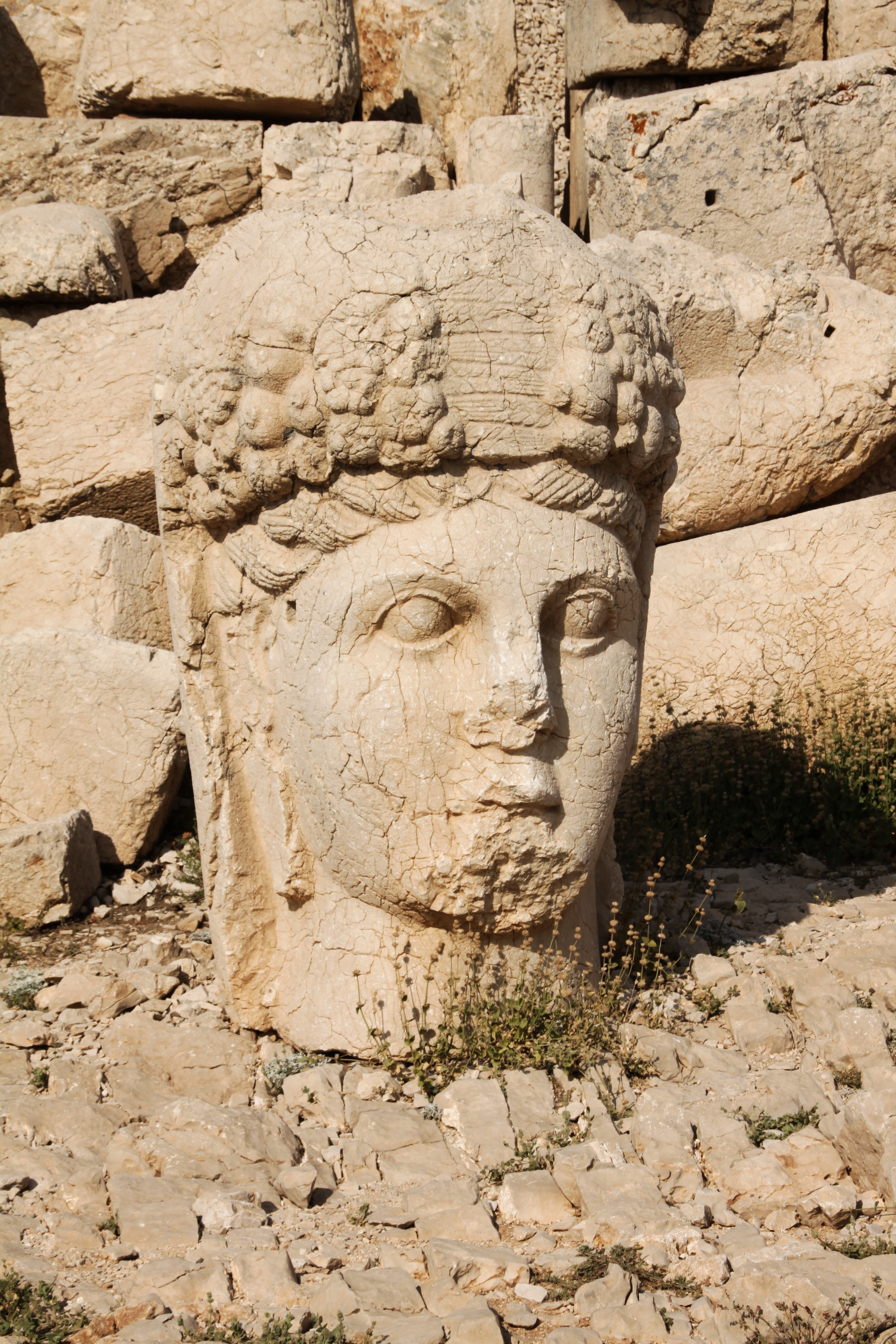
Monumental head of the goddess Commagene (Tyche-Bakht) from Mount Nemrut

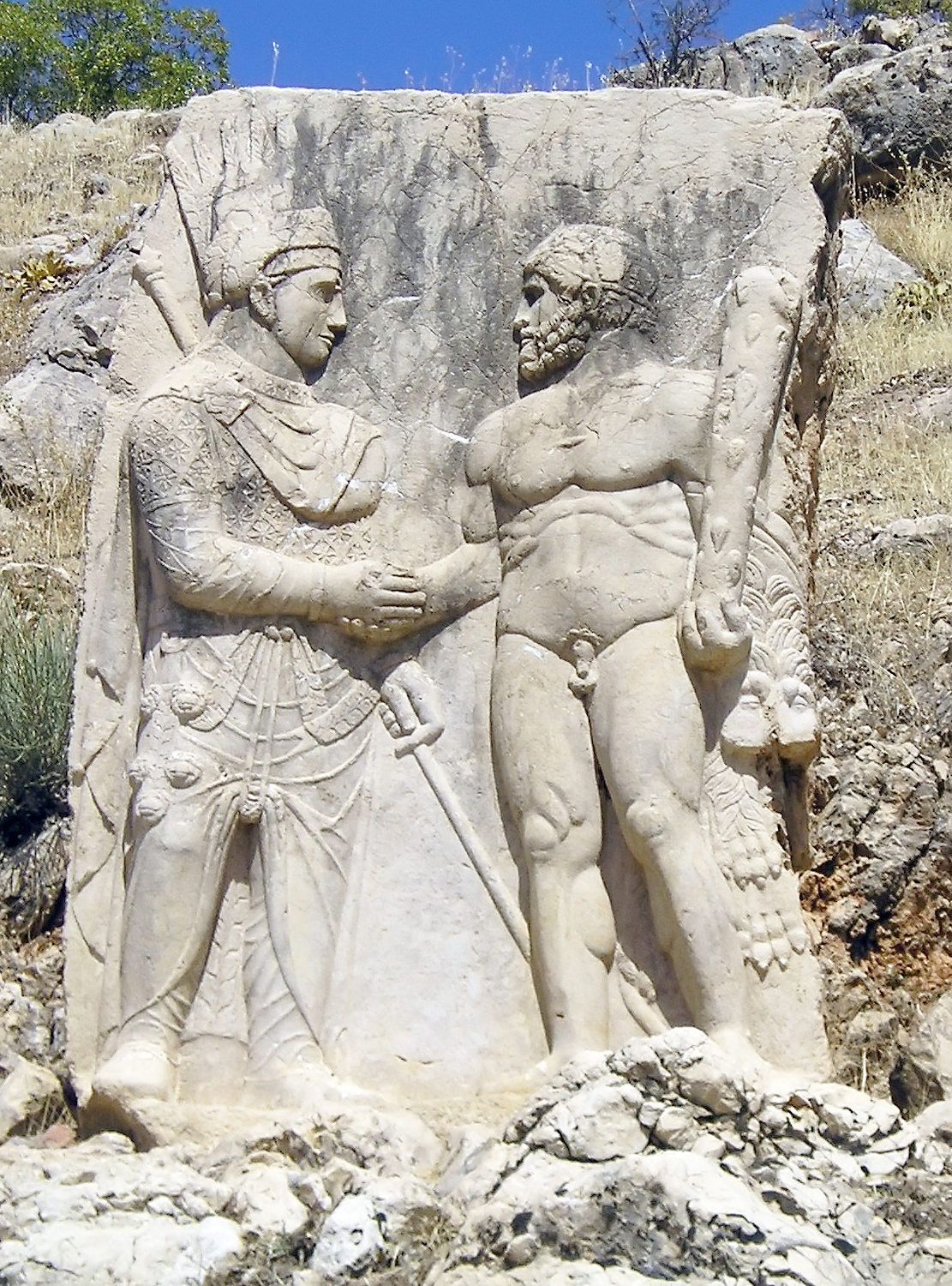
Antiochus I of Commagene, shaking hands with Herakles.

The cultural identity of the Kingdom of Commagene has been variously characterized. Pierre Merlat suggests that the Commagenian city of Doliche, like others in its vicinity, was "half Iranianized and half Hellenized". David M. Lang describes Commagene as "a former Armenian satellite kingdom", while Blömer and Winter call it a "Hellenistic kingdom". Millar suggests that a local dialect of Aramaic might have been spoken there, Fergus Millar considers that, "in some parts of the Euphrates region, such as Commagene, nothing approaching an answer to questions about local culture is possible."

While the language used on public monuments was typically Greek, Commagene's rulers made no secret of their Persian affinities. The kings of Commagene claimed descent from the Orontid dynasty and would therefore have been related to the family that founded the Kingdom of Armenia; while Sartre states the accuracy of these claims is uncertain. At Antiochus Theos' sanctuary at Mount Nemrut, the king erected monumental statues of deities with mixed Greek and Iranian names, such as Zeus-Oromasdes, while celebrating his own descent from the royal families of Persia and Armenia in a Greek-language inscription. None of Antiochus' successors seem to have made reference to their descent from Orontes, which, according to Facella, is "a sign that the reference to the Persian past was no longer useful."

The Commagenean rulers had Iranian and Greek names (Antiochus, Samos, Mithridates). The various Iranian onomasticons located in Commagene demonstrate the extensive Iranization in the region. Over the course of the first centuries BC and AD, the names given on a tomb at Sofraz Köy show a mix of "typical Hellenistic dynastic names with an early introduction of Latin personal names." Lang notes the vitality of Graeco-Roman culture in Commagene.

While few things about his origins are known with certainty, 2nd-century Attic Greek poet Lucian of Samosata claimed to have been born in Samosata in the former kingdom of Commagene, and described himself in one satirical work as "an Assyrian". Despite writing well after the Roman conquest of Commagene, Lucian claimed to be "still barbarous in speech and almost wearing a jacket (kandys) in the Assyrian style". This has been taken as a possible, but not definitive, allusion to the possibility that his native language was an Aramaic dialect.

In keeping with Commagene Greek and Iranian cultural elements, Antiochus' cult was a synthesis of Greco-Iranian religion, which had existed in Commagene before his time.

== History ==
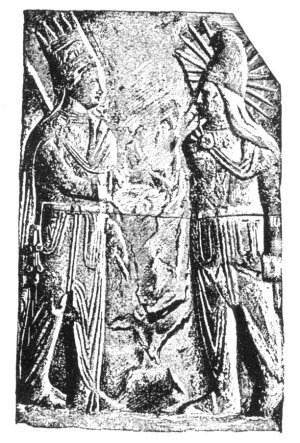
Mithras-Helios, in Phrygian cap with solar rays, with Antiochus I of Commagene. (Mt Nemrut, 1st century BC)

Commagene was originally a small Syro-Hittite kingdom, located in modern south-central Turkey, with its capital at Samosata (modern Samsat, near the Euphrates). It was first mentioned in Assyrian texts as Kummuhu, which was normally an ally of Assyria, but eventually annexed as a province in 708 BC under Sargon II. The Achaemenid Empire then conquered Commagene in the 6th century BC and Alexander the Great conquered the territory in the 4th century BC. After the breakup of the Empire of Alexander the Great, the region became part of the Hellenistic Seleucids, and Commagene emerged in about 163 BC as a state and province in the Greco-Syrian Seleucid Empire. Perhaps Commagene was part of the kingdom of Armenia in the early Hellenistic period, and was possibly annexed to the Seleucid kingdom soon after Armenia's conquest. (Note: "Commagene was a district separate from Seleucis, bordering on Cilicia and Cappadocia. Its natural borders were the Taurus on the north and the Euphrates to the east. It occurs in Assyrian and Hittite records as Kummuhu. It was perhaps part of the kingdom of Armenia in the early Hellenistic period, and was possibly annexed to the Seleucid kingdom soon after Armenia's conquest and partition into the kingdoms of Armenia and Sophene under Antiochus III." — Butcher (2004))

The Hellenistic kingdom of Commagene, bounded by Cilicia on the west and Cappadocia on the north, arose in 162 BC when its governor, Ptolemy, a satrap of the disintegrating Seleucid Empire, declared himself independent. Ptolemy's dynasty was related to the Parthian kings, but his descendant Mithridates I Callinicus (109 BC – 70 BC) embraced Hellenistic culture and married the Syrian Greek princess Laodice VII Thea. His dynasty could thus claim ties with both Alexander the Great and the Persian kings. This marriage may also have been part of a peace treaty between Commagene and the Seleucid Empire. From this point on, the kingdom of Commagene became more Greek than Persian. With Sophene, it was to serve as an important centre for the transmission of Hellenistic and Roman culture in the region. Details are sketchy, but Mithridates Callinicus is thought have accepted Armenian suzerainty during the reign of Tigranes II the Great.

Mithridates and Laodice's son was King Antiochus I Theos of Commagene (reigned 70 –38 BC). Antiochus was an ally of the Roman general Pompey during the latter's campaigns against Mithridates VI of Pontus in 64 BC. Thanks to his diplomatic skills, Antiochus was able to keep Commagene independent from the Romans. In 17 when Antiochus III of Commagene died, Emperor Tiberius annexed Commagene to the province of Syria. According to Josephus, this move was supported by the local nobility but opposed by the mass of the common people, who preferred to remain under their kings as before; Tacitus, on the other hand, states that "most preferred Roman, but others royal rule".

In 38 AD, Caligula reinstated Antiochus III's son Antiochus IV and also gave him the wild areas of Cilicia to govern. Antiochus IV was the only client king of Commagene under the Roman Empire. Deposed by Caligula and restored again upon Claudius' accession in 41 AD, Antiochus reigned until 72, when Emperor Vespasian deposed the dynasty and definitively re-annexed the territory to the Roman Empire, acting on allegations "that Antiochus was about to revolt. The Legio VI Ferrata, which Paetus led into Commagene, was not resisted by the populace; a day-long battle with Antiochus' sons Epiphanes and Callinicus ended in a draw, and Antiochus surrendered. The Legio III Gallica would occupy the area by 73 AD. A 1st-century letter in Syriac by Mara Bar Serapion describes refugees fleeing the Romans across the Euphrates and bemoans the Romans' refusal to let the refugees return; this might describe the Roman takeover of either 18 or 72. The descendants of Antiochus IV lived prosperously and in distinction in Anatolia, Greece, Italy, and the Middle East. As a testament to the descendants of Antiochus IV, the citizens of Athens erected a funeral monument in honor of his grandson Philopappos, who was a benefactor of the city, upon his death in 116. Another descendant of Antiochus IV was the historian Gaius Asinius Quadratus, who lived in the 3rd century.

== Geography ==
Commagene extended from the right bank of the Euphrates to the Taurus and Amanus Mountains. Strabo, who counts Commagene as part of Syria, notes the kingdom's fertility. Its capital and chief city was Samosata (now submerged under the Atatürk Reservoir).

The boundaries of Commagene fluctuated over time. Under Antiochus Theos, the Kingdom of Commagene controlled a particularly large area. Doliche was under Commagenian rule "for about 35 years"; after being governed by Antiochus Theos, it might have been incorporated into the Roman province of Syria as early as 31 BC. Germanicea declared itself a Commagenian city in Roman times, although originally it was not. On the other hand, Zeugma, while ruled for a time by Commagene, was popularly and traditionally considered to belong to the region of Cyrrhestica; Strabo says it had been assigned to Commagene by Pompey.

== Archaeological remains ==
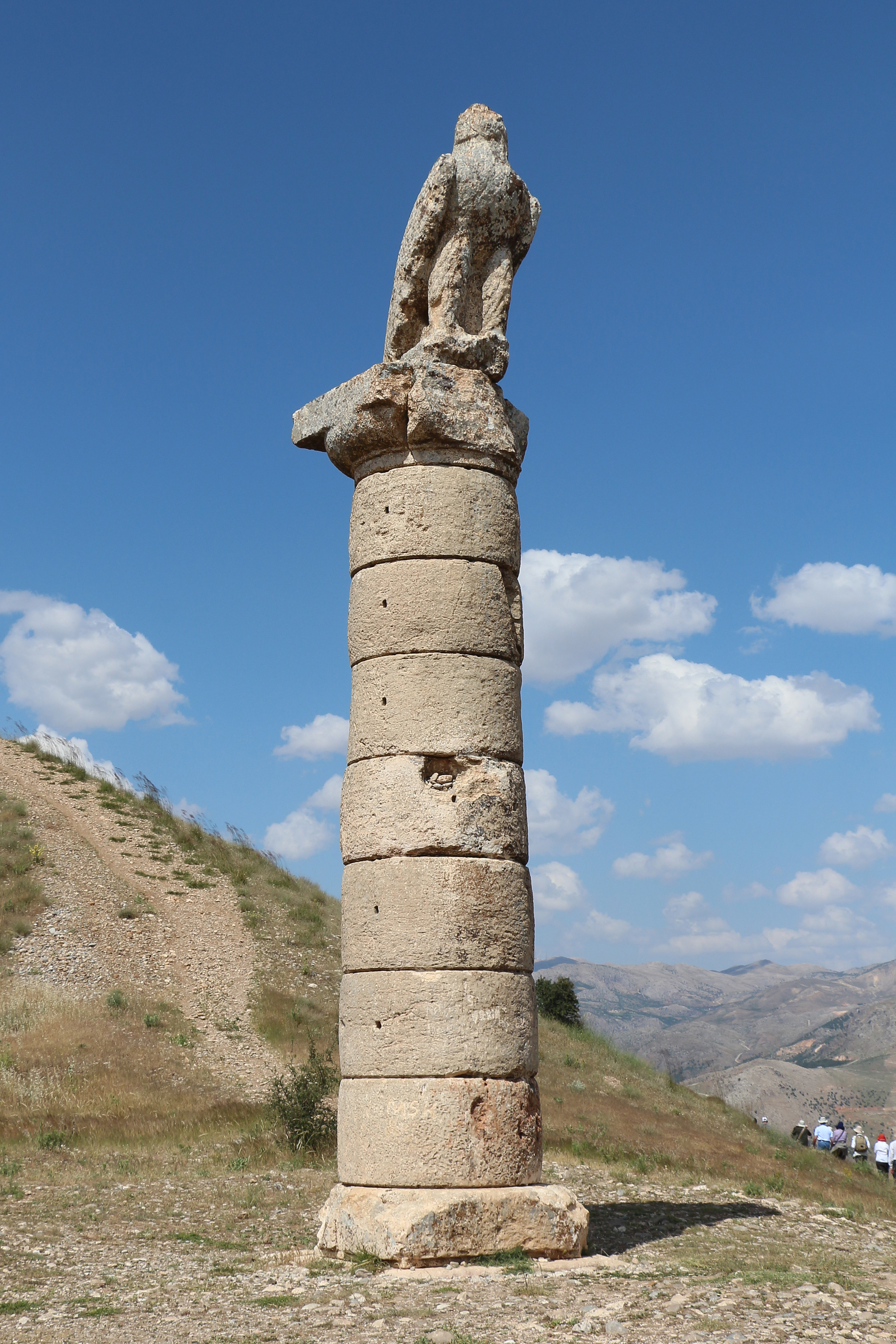
Eagle-topped column from the royal burial mound at Karakuş

The limestone propaganda-like statues and reliefs built during Antiochus Theos' reign reflect the Parthian influence in their sculpture.

When the Romans conquered Commagene, the great royal sanctuary at Mount Nemrut was abandoned. The Romans looted the burial tumuli of their goods and the Legio XVI Flavia Firma built and dedicated a bridge. The surrounding thick forests were cut down and cleared by the Romans for wood, timber and charcoal, causing much erosion to the area.

Another important archaeological site dating to the Kingdom of Commagene is the sanctuary of Zeus Soter at Damlıca, dedicated in the time of Mithridates II.

In Commagene, there is a column topped by an eagle, which has earned the mound the name Karakuş, or Black Bird. An inscription there indicates the presence of a royal tomb that housed three women. The vault of that tomb, however, has also been looted. The main excavations on the site were carried out by Friedrich Karl Dörner of the University of Münster. Another royal burial site is at Arsameia, which also served as a residence of the kings of Commagene.

Many of the ancient artifacts from the Kingdom of Commagene are on display at the Adıyaman Archaeological Museum.

== List of rulers of Commagene ==
=== Satraps of Commagene, 290–163 BC ===
- Sames 290–260 BC
- Arsames I 260–228 BC
- Xerxes of Armenia 228–212 BC
- Ptolemaeus of Commagene 201–163 BC

=== Kings of Commagene, 163 BC – 72 AD ===
- Ptolemaeus of Commagene 163–130 BC
- Sames II Theosebes Dikaios 130–109 BC
- Mithridates I Callinicus 109–70 BC
- Antiochus I of Commagene 70–38 BC
- Mithridates II of Commagene 38–20 BC
- Mithridates III of Commagene 20–12 BC
- Antiochus III of Commagene 12 BC – 17 AD
- Ruled by Rome 17–38 AD
- Antiochus IV of Commagene 38–72 AD

== Sources ==
- Allsen, Thomas T. (2011). The Royal Hunt in Eurasian History. University of Pennsylvania Press. p. 37. ISBN 978-0812201079.
- Ball, Warwick (2002). Rome in the East: The Transformation of an Empire. Routledge. ISBN 9781134823871.
- Blömer, Michael; Winter, Engelbert (2011). Commagene: The Land of the Gods between the Taurus and the Euphrates. Homer Kitabevi. ISBN 978-9944-483-35-3.
- Boyce, Mary; Grenet, Frantz (1991). Beck, Roger (ed.). A History of Zoroastrianism, Zoroastrianism under Macedonian and Roman Rule. Leiden: Brill. ISBN 978-9004293915.
- Bryce, Trevor (2012). The World of the Neo-Hittite Kingdoms: A Political and Military History. Oxford/New York: Oxford University Press. pp. 110–114, 304. ISBN 978-0-19-921872-1.
- Butcher, Kevin (2004). Coinage in Roman Syria: Northern Syria, 64 BC-AD 253. Royal Numismatic Society. p. 454. ISBN 0901405582.
- Cameron, Hamish (2018). Making Mesopotamia: Geography and Empire in a Romano-Iranian Borderland. Brill. ISBN 978-9004388628.
- Canepa, Matthew (2010). "Achaemenid and Seleukid Royal Funerary Practices and Middle Iranian Kingship". In Börm, H.; Wiesehöfer, J. (eds.). Commutatio et Contentio. Studies in the Late Roman, Sasanian, and Early Islamic Near East in Memory of Zeev Rubin. Düsseldorf. pp. 1–21.
- Canepa, Matthew P. (2015). "Dynastic Sanctuaries and the Transformation of Iranian Kingship between Alexander and Islam". In Babaie, Sussan; Grigor, Talinn (eds.). Persian Kingship and Architecture: Strategies of Power in Iran from the Achaemenids to the Pahlavis. I.B.Tauris. pp. 1–288. ISBN 9780857734778.
- Collar, Anna F. C. (2012). "Commagene, Communication and the Cult of Jupiter Dolichenus". In Michael Blömer; Engelbert Winter (eds.). Iuppiter Dolichenus: Vom Lokalkult zur Reichsreligion. Tübingen: Mohr Siebeck. pp. 102–103. ISBN 978-3-16-151797-6.
- Colledge, Malcolm A.R. (1979). "Sculptors' Stone-Carving Techniques in Seleucid and Parthian Iran, and Their Place in the "Parthian" Cultural Milieu: Some Preliminary Observations". East and West. 29, No. 1/4 (December). Istituto Italiano per l'Africa e l'Oriente (IsIAO): 221-240.
- Campbell, Leroy A. (2015). Mithraic iconography and ideology. Brill. ISBN 978-90-04-29617-6.
- Cook, J.M. (1993). The Persian Empire (Repr. ed.). New York: Barns & Noble Books. pp. 170, 173, 193, 212, 213, 216, 217, 221–223, 257, 263. ISBN 978-1-56619-115-9.
- Crone, Patricia (2012). The Nativist Prophets of Early Islamic Iran: Rural Revolt and Local Zoroastrianism. Cambridge University Press. ISBN 978-1107642386.
- Curtis, Vesta Sarkhosh; Stewart, Sarah, eds. (2007), The Age of the Parthians, Ideas of Iran, vol. 2, London: I. B. Tauris
- Drower, M; Grey, E.; Sherwin-White, S.; Wiesehöfer, J. (2021). "Armenia". Oxford Classical Dictionary. doi:10.1093/acrefore/9780199381135.013.777. ISBN 978-0-19-938113-5.
- Erskine, Andrew; Llewellyn-Jones, Lloyd; Wallace, Shane (2017). The Hellenistic Court: Monarchic Power and Elite Society from Alexander to Cleopatra. The Classical Press of Wales. ISBN 978-1910589625. "Another self-designated descendant from a member of one of the seven great house, Hydarnes, was the Orontid Dynasty of Armenia"
- Facella, Margherita (2021). "Orontids". In Yarshater, Ehsan (ed.). Encyclopædia Iranica (Online ed.). Encyclopædia Iranica Foundation.
- Ferguson, John (2021). Among the Gods: An Archaeological Exploration of Ancient Greek Religion. Routledge. ISBN 978-0367750633.
- Gaggero, Gianfranco (2016). "Armenians in Xenophon". Greek Texts and Armenian Traditions: An Interdisciplinary Approach. De Gruyter. "The above mentioned Orontids..[..]..but also because the two satraps who were contemporaries of Xenophon's are explicitly stated to be Persian."
- Garsoian, Nina (2005). "Tigran II". Encyclopaedia Iranica.
- Graf, David F. (2019). Rome and the Arabian Frontier: From the Nabataeans to the Saracens. Aldershot: Ashgate. ISBN 978-0-86078-658-0.
- Jacobs, Bruno; Rollinger, Robert (2021). A Companion to the Achaemenid Persian Empire. John Wiley & Sons. ISBN 978-1119174288.
- Jones, A.H.M. (1971). The Cities of the Eastern Roman Provinces (2nd ed.). Wipf & Stock publishers.
- Lang, David M (1983). "Iran, Armenia and Georgia". In Yarshater, Ehsan (ed.). The Cambridge History of Iran: The Seleucid, Parthian and Sasanian Periods. Vol. 3(1). Cambridge: Cambridge University Press. pp. 512–537. ISBN 0-521-20092-X..
- Merlat, Pierre (1960). "Le site de Doliché". Jupiter Dolichenus : Essai d'interprétation et de synthèse. Presses Universitaires de France. "une de ces nombreuses localités mi-iranisées, mi-hellénisées d'Asie Mineure et de Syrie du Nord"
- Merz, Annette; Tieleman, Teun L (2012). The Letter of Mara bar Sarapion in Context: Proceedings of the Symposium Held at Utrecht University, 10-12 December 2009. Leiden: Brill. ISBN 9789004233010.
- Michels, Christoph (2021). "'Achaemenid' and 'Hellenistic' Strands of Representation in the Minor Kingdoms of Asia Minor". Common Dwelling Place of all the Gods: Commagene in its Local, Regional, and Global Context. Franz Steiner Verlag. pp. 475–496. ISBN 978-3515129251.
- Millar, Fergus (1993). The Roman Near East, 31 BC – AD 337. Cambridge, Massachusetts: Harvard University Press. ISBN 978-0-674-77885-6.
- Olbrycht, Marek Jan (2021). Early Arsakid Parthia (ca. 250-165 B.C.). Brill. ISBN 978-9004460751.
- Russell, J. R. (1986). "Armenia and Iran iii. Armenian Religion". Encyclopaedia Iranica, Vol. II, Fasc. 4. pp. 438–444.
- Sartre, Maurice (2005). The Middle East Under Rome. Harvard University Press. ISBN 9780674016835.
- Shayegan, M. Rahim (2016). "The Arsacids and Commagene". In Curtis, Vesta Sarkhosh; Pendleton, Elizabeth J.; Alram, Michael; Daryaee, Touraj (eds.). The Parthian and Early Sasanian Empires: Adaptation and Expansion. Oxbow Books. ISBN 9781785702082.
- Sherwin-White, Susan M.; Kuhrt, Amélie (1993). From Samarkhand to Sardis: A New Approach to the Seleucid Empire. University of California Press. ISBN 9780520081833.
- Spawforth, Antony (2016). "Nemrut Dağ". Oxford Classical Dictionary. doi:10.1093/acrefore/9780199381135.013.4376. ISBN 978-0-19-938113-5.
- Strootman, Rolf (2020). "Hellenism and Persianism in Iran". Dabir. 7: 201–227. doi:10.1163/29497833-00701016. hdl:1874/408015.
- Toumanoff, Cyril (1963). Studies in Christian Caucasian history. Georgetown University Press.
- Vlassopoulos, Kostas (2013). Greeks and Barbarians. Cambridge University Press. ISBN 978-0521148023.
- Widengren, G. (1986). "Antiochus of Commagene". Encyclopaedia Iranica, Vol. II, Fasc. 2. pp. 135–136.
