= 90s =

Ninth decade of the first century AD

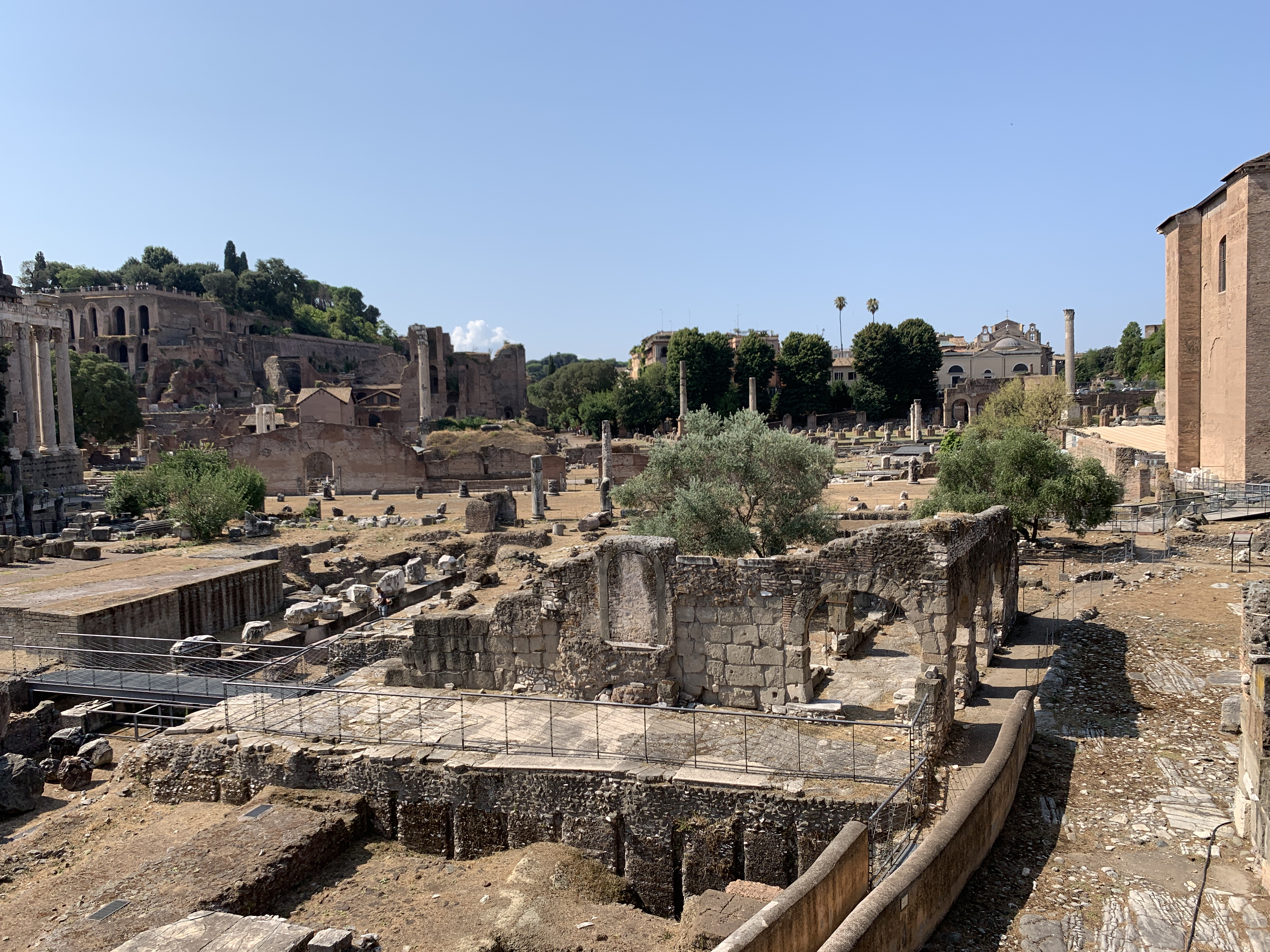
Ruins of the Forum of Nerva, completed in 97

The 90s was a decade that ran from January 1, AD 90, to December 31, AD 99.

As the decade began, the Han–Xiongnu War was approaching its end, with the Xiongnu having been on the verge of collapse since the Battle of the Altai Mountains (89) the prior decade. In 90, Dou Xian dispatched General Geng Kui and Shizi of the Southern Xiongnu with 8000 light cavalry to attack the Northern Chanyu, encamped at Heyun (河雲). There, the Han killed 8000 men and captured several thousands. By 91, the last remnants of the Northern Xiongnu had migrated west towards the Ili River valley, ending the war. After the downfall of the Xiongnu, the Xianbei replaced them with a loose confederacy from 93.

The Roman Empire did not see any significant military action this decade, excepting clashes along the Danube in 92. Economically, the empire saw reforms by Nerva after the death of Domitian in 96, including but not limited to a string of economic reforms intended to alleviate the burden of taxation from the most needy Romans. Before long, Nerva's expenses strained the economy of Rome and, although perhaps not ruinous to the extent once suggested by Syme, necessitated the formation of a special commission of economy to drastically reduce expenditures.

According to some historians, Jews and Christians were heavily persecuted toward the end of Domitian's reign (89-96). The Book of Revelation, which mentions at least one instance of martyrdom (Rev 2:13; cf. 6:9), is thought by many scholars to have been written during Domitian's reign. According to Barnes, "Melito, Tertullian, and Bruttius stated that Domitian persecuted the Christians. Melito and Bruttius vouchsafe no details, Tertullian only that Domitian soon changed his mind and recalled those whom he had exiled". A minority of the historians have maintained that there was little or no anti-Christian activity during Domitian's time. The lack of consensus by historians about the extent of persecution during the reign of Domitian derives from the fact that while accounts of persecution exist, these accounts are cursory or their reliability is debated.

In AD 92, the Flavian Palace was completed. In AD 97, the Forum of Nerva was completed. Josephus wrote Antiquities of the Jews (covering the history of the Jewish people), Against Apion (a defense of Judaism as a classical religion and philosophy against criticism by Apion), and The Life of Flavius Josephus (an autobiographical text where Josephus details his own life). Tacitus wrote Germania (a historical and ethnographic work on the Germanic peoples outside the Roman Empire) and Agricola (which recounts the life of his father-in-law Gnaeus Julius Agricola, an eminent Roman general and governor of Britain).

== Events ==
=== AD 90 ===
==== By place ====
====== Roman Empire ======
- An epidemic afflicts Rome.

==== By topic ====
====== Art ======
- The Young Flavian Woman is made. It is now kept at Musei Capitolini, Rome (approximate date).

=== AD 91 ===
==== By place ====
====== Roman Empire ======
- Manius Acilius Glabrio and Marcus Ulpius Traianus become Roman Consuls.
- Pliny the Younger is named a tribunus plebis.

====== Asia ======
- Ban Chao is made protector-general of the Western Regions.

==== By topic ====
====== Art and Science ======
- Rome is described by Statius in his poems.

=== AD 92 ===
==== By place ====
====== Roman Empire ======
- Emperor Domitian becomes a Roman Consul.
- In spring, several tribes (probably Marcomanni, Quadi, Jazyges) cross the Danube and attack Pannonia, probably destroying Legio XXI Rapax. These tribes are defeated from May to December 92, and chased back over the river. The Romans do not pursue the retreating tribes.
- The Roman army moves into Mesopotamia (modern Syria).
- The Flavian Palace is completed on the Palatine.

=== AD 93 ===
==== By place ====
====== Roman Empire ======
- Emperor Domitian persecutes the Christians.
- Pliny the Younger is named a praetor.

====== Asia ======
- The Xianbei incorporates 100,000 Xiongnu, and establishes the Xianbei State in Mongolia (approximate date).

==== By topic ====
====== Literature ======
- Josephus completes his Jewish Antiquities (or in AD 94).

=== AD 94 ===
==== By place ====
====== Roman Empire ======
- Emperor Domitian rebuilds and rededicates the Curia Julia (meeting place of the Roman Senate), which had burned down in AD 64.
- Domitian banishes all Stoic philosophers from Rome.

====== Asia ======
- The Chinese General Ban Chao completes his conquest of the Tarim Basin by taking Yānqi, which is located on the strategic Silk Road.

==== By topic ====
====== Literature ======
- The Roman poet Publius Papinius Statius retires to Naples from Rome (approximate date).

=== AD 95 ===
==== By place ====
====== Roman Empire ======
- Emperor Domitian and Titus Flavius Clemens become Roman Consuls.
- Domitian executes senators out of paranoiac fears that they are plotting to kill him.
- The Roman consul Manius Acilius Glabrio is ordered by Domitian to descend into the arena of the Colosseum to fight a lion. After he kills the animal, Domitian banishes and puts him to death.

==== By topic ====
====== Epidemic ======
- In Rome a severe form of malaria appears in the farm districts and will continue for the next 500 years, taking out of cultivation the fertile land of the Campagna, whose market gardens supply the city with fresh products. The fever drives small groups of farmers into the crowded city, bringing the malaria with them, and lowers Rome's live-birth rate while rates elsewhere in the empire are rising.

====== Religion ======
- The Book of Revelation is written (approximate date).
- Possible date for the writing of the First Epistle of Peter.

=== AD 96 ===
==== By place ====
====== Roman Empire ======
- September 18 – Emperor Domitian is stabbed to death by a freedman at the age 44 after a 15-year reign, in a palace conspiracy involving officers of the Praetorian Guard. The Flavian Dynasty ends.
- Nerva is declared emperor by the Roman Senate as the new ruler of the Roman Empire. He recalls citizens exiled by Domitian; this is the beginning of the Era of the Five Good Emperors. The Antonines Dynasty starts.
- Marcus Ulpius Traianus becomes governor of Upper Germany.
- The Arch of Titus is completed in Rome.

==== By topic ====
====== Art and Science ======
- End of the period covered by Tacitus in his Histories.

====== Religion ======
- The Book of Revelation is written (approximate date).
- A schism in Buddhism creates a new, popular religion in India, Mahâyâna ("Great Vehicle").

=== AD 97 ===
==== By place ====
====== Roman Empire ======
- October 28 – Emperor Nerva recalls his general Marcus Ulpius Trajanus, age 44, from the German frontier and is forced by the Praetorian Guard to adopt him as his successor.
- Tacitus advances to consulship.
- The Roman colony of Cuicul is started in Numidia.
- Gloucester, England is founded as Colonia Glevum Nervensis by the Romans.
- Nerva recognizes the Sanhedrin of Jamnia as an official governmental body of the Jews, and the patriarch or nasi is designated as the representative of the Jewish people in Rome.
- Sextus Julius Frontinus is appointed superintendent of the aqueducts (curator aquarum) in Rome. At least 10 aqueducts supply the city with 250 million US gallons (950,000 m^{3}) of water per day. The public baths use half the supply.

====== China ======
- Gan Ying, is sent as an emissary to Daquin (Rome), though he is turned back by the Parthians.

==== By topic ====
====== Religion ======
- Evaristus succeeds Pope Clement I as the fifth pope (according to Catholic tradition; none of the popes until the mid second century is certain).

=== AD 98 ===
==== By place ====
====== Roman Empire ======
- January 1 – Emperor Nerva suffers a stroke during a private audience.
- January 27 – Nerva dies of a fever at his villa in the Gardens of Sallust and is succeeded by his adopted son Trajan. Trajan is the first Roman Emperor born in Italica, near Seville. A brilliant soldier and administrator, he enters Rome without ceremony and wins over the public. Continuing the policies of Augustus, Vespasian and Nerva, he restores the Senate to its full status in the government and begins a form of state welfare aimed at assuring that poor children are fed and taken care of. He has a specific vision of the Empire, which reaches its maximum extent under his rule, and keeps a close watch on finances. Taxes, without any increase, are sufficient during his reign to pay the considerable costs of the budget. The informers used by Domitian to support his tyranny are expelled from Rome. In order to maintain the Port of Alexandria, Trajan reopens the canal between the Nile and the Red Sea.
- Trajan elevates Ladenburg to city status (civitas).

==== By topic ====
====== Arts and sciences ======
- Tacitus finishes his Germania (approximate date).

====== Commerce ======
- The silver content of the Roman denarius rises to 93 percent under emperor Trajan, up from 92 percent under Domitian.

=== AD 99 ===
==== By place ====
====== Roman Empire ======
- Emperor Trajan returns to Rome.
- Emissaries of the Kushan Empire reach the Roman Empire.
- August 29 – Papyrus Oxyrhynchus 581, recording the sale of a slave girl, is written.

==== By topic ====
====== Religion ======
- November 23 – Pope Evaristus succeeds Pope Clement I as the fifth pope according to Roman Catholic tradition.

== Significant people ==
- Titus Flavius Domitianus, Roman Emperor (AD 81–96)
- Nerva, Roman Emperor (AD 96–98)

== Births ==
AD 90

- Ishmael ben Elishha, Jewish rabbi (approximate date)
- Quintus Tuneius Rufus, Roman politician (approximate date)

AD 92

- Pope Anicetus

AD 94

- An of Han, Chinese emperor (d. 125)

AD 95

- Appian of Alexandria, Greek historian and writer (d. 165)

AD 96

- Lucius Minicius Natalis Quadronius Verus, Roman statesman

AD 99

- c. March 9 – Narcissus of Jerusalem, Christian bishop and saint (d. c. 216)

== Deaths ==
AD 90

- Gaius Valerius Flaccus, Roman poet (approximate date)
- Pedanius Dioscorides, Greek physician (approximate date)
- Tiberius Julius Rhescuporis I, Roman client king

AD 91

- Gaius Vipstanus Apronianus, Roman politician, governor
- Julia Flavia, daughter of Titus, lover of his brother Domitian (b. AD 64)
- Publius Valerius Patruinus, Roman politician, governor

AD 92

- April 9 – Yuan An, Chinese administrator, scholar and statesman
- Antipas of Pergamum, Roman bishop, martyr
- Ban Gu, Chinese historian, poet and writer (b. AD 32)
- Dou Xian, Chinese general and statesman of the Eastern Han dynasty
- Gaius Julius Archelaus Antiochus Epiphanes, prince of Commagene (b. AD 38)

AD 93

- August 23 – Gnaeus Julius Agricola, Roman general and governor (b. AD 40)
- Arulenus Rusticus, Roman politician and Stoic philosopher (executed)
- Herennius Senecio, Roman Stoic philosopher and writer (executed)
- Lucius Antistius Rusticus, Roman politician and governor

AD 94

- Guo Gong [zh], Eastern Han Dynasty official

AD 95

- Avilius of Alexandria, patriarch of Alexandria
- Epaphroditus, Roman freedman of Nero (executed)
- Flavius Scorpus, Roman charioteer (b. c. AD 68)
- Manius Acilius Glabrio, Roman politician (executed)

AD 96

- September 18 – Domitian, Roman emperor (b. AD 51)
- Gaius Manlius Valens, Roman senator and consul (b. AD 6)
- Publius Papinius Statius, Roman poet (approximate date)

AD 97

- Lucius Verginius Rufus, Roman politician and general (b. AD 15)
- Timothy, Christian evangelist and saint (b. AD 17)
- Titus Petronius Secundus, Roman prefect (b. AD 40)
- Zhangde, Chinese empress of the Han Dynasty

AD 98

- January 27 – Nerva, Roman emperor (b. AD 30)
- Casperius Aelianus, Roman praetorian prefect (b. AD 14)

AD 99

- Approximate date – Clement of Rome, pope of the Catholic Church
