= AD 64 =

AD 64 in various calendars
- Gregorian calendar: AD 64; LXIV
- Ab urbe condita: 817
- Assyrian calendar: 4814
- Balinese saka calendar: N/A
- Bengali calendar: −530 – −529
- Berber calendar: 1014
- Buddhist calendar: 608
- Burmese calendar: −574
- Byzantine calendar: 5572–5573
- Chinese calendar: 癸亥年 (Water Pig); 2761 or 2554 — to — 甲子年 (Wood Rat); 2762 or 2555
- Coptic calendar: −220 – −219
- Discordian calendar: 1230
- Ethiopian calendar: 56–57
- Hebrew calendar: 3824–3825
- Hindu calendars
- Vikram Samvat: 120–121
- Shaka Samvat: N/A
- Kali Yuga: 3164–3165
- Holocene calendar: 10064
- Iranian calendar: 558 BP – 557 BP
- Islamic calendar: 575 BH – 574 BH
- Javanese calendar: N/A
- Julian calendar: AD 64; LXIV
- Korean calendar: 2397
- Minguo calendar: 1848 before ROC 民前1848年
- Nanakshahi calendar: −1404
- Seleucid era: 375/376 AG
- Thai solar calendar: 606–607
- Tibetan calendar: ཆུ་མོ་ཕག་ལོ་ (female Water-Boar); 190 or −191 or −963 — to — ཤིང་ཕོ་བྱི་བ་ལོ་ (male Wood-Rat); 191 or −190 or −962

AD 64 (LXIV) was a leap year starting on Sunday of the Julian calendar, the 64th Year of the Anno Domini designation, the 64th year of the 1st millennium, the 64th year of the 1st century, and the 4th year of the 7th decade. At the time, it was known as the Year of the Consulship of Bassus and Crassus (or, less frequently, year 817 Ab urbe condita). The denomination AD 64 for this year has been used since the early medieval period, when the Anno Domini calendar era became the prevalent method in Europe for naming years.

== Events ==
=== By place ===
==== Roman Empire ====
- July 18- 27 – Great Fire of Rome: A fire begins which destroyed three of fourteen of the administrative regions of Rome, more commonly known as the Palatine Hill, the Circus Maximus, and the Oppian hill. Also suffering severe damage were the Campus Martius and the Via Lata.
- Persecution of Christians in Rome begins under Nero. Peter the Apostle is possibly among those crucified.
- Nero proposes a new urban planning program based on the creation of buildings decorated with ornate porticos, the widening of the streets and the use of open spaces. This plan will not be applied until after his death in AD 68.
- Lyon sends a large sum of money to Rome to aid in the reconstruction. However, during the winter of AD 64–65, Lyon suffers a catastrophic fire itself, and Nero reciprocates by sending money to Lyon.

==== Asia ====
- The Kushan sack the ancient town of Taxila (in modern-day Pakistan).

=== By topic ===
==== Religion ====
- First Epistle of Peter written from Babylon according to traditional Christian belief.
- Paul leaves Titus in Crete as bishop (approximate date) Then goes to Asia Minor

==== Arts and sciences ====
- Seneca proclaims the equality of all men, including slaves.

== Births ==
- September 13 – Julia Flavia, daughter of Titus and lover of his brother Domitian (d. AD 96)
- Julia Agricola, daughter of Gnaeus Julius Agricola
- Philo of Byblos, Phoenician historian and writer (d. 141)

== Deaths ==
- October 13 – Peter the Apostle (Margherita Guarducci, who led the research leading to the rediscovery of Peter's reputed tomb in 1963, concluded that Peter died on that date, shortly after the Great Fire of Rome and during the festivities to mark "dies imperii" of Emperor Nero, and that Peter and other Christians were crucified in honor of the decennial of Nero's October 13, AD 54 ascension to the imperial throne.)(b. 1 BC)
- Decimus Junius Silanus Torquatus, Roman consul (b. AD 16)
- Paul the Apostle (earliest date) (b. AD 5)
- Yin Lihua, Chinese empress (b. AD 5)

== See also ==
- First Martyrs of the Church of Rome
