= Holconia (Roman factory owner) =

Holconia (fl. 1st century AD), was an Ancient Roman businesswoman in Pompeii. She was the owner and manager of a brick tile factory.

== Life and career ==
Holconia belonged to a leading family in Pompeii. The Holconii family were great land owners and had earned a fortune as the producers of the vine vitus Holconia, which was popular also in Campania.

She owned land with mud suitable to produce tiles, on which she started a brick factory. She was the owner and manager of the brick factory with a female colleague and businesspartner, Attia Calliste, who was possibly her former manumitted slave, and the brick stamps from the tile factory were marked with the name of both women.

She belonged to the group of women in Pompeii who is often referred to when it comes to Ancient Roman businesswomen. Pompeii is unusually well documented for a Roman city, and gives a valuable source of information about the professional opportunities of Ancient Roman women.
