= Valdonega Roman Villa =

Roman-era residence in Verona, Italy

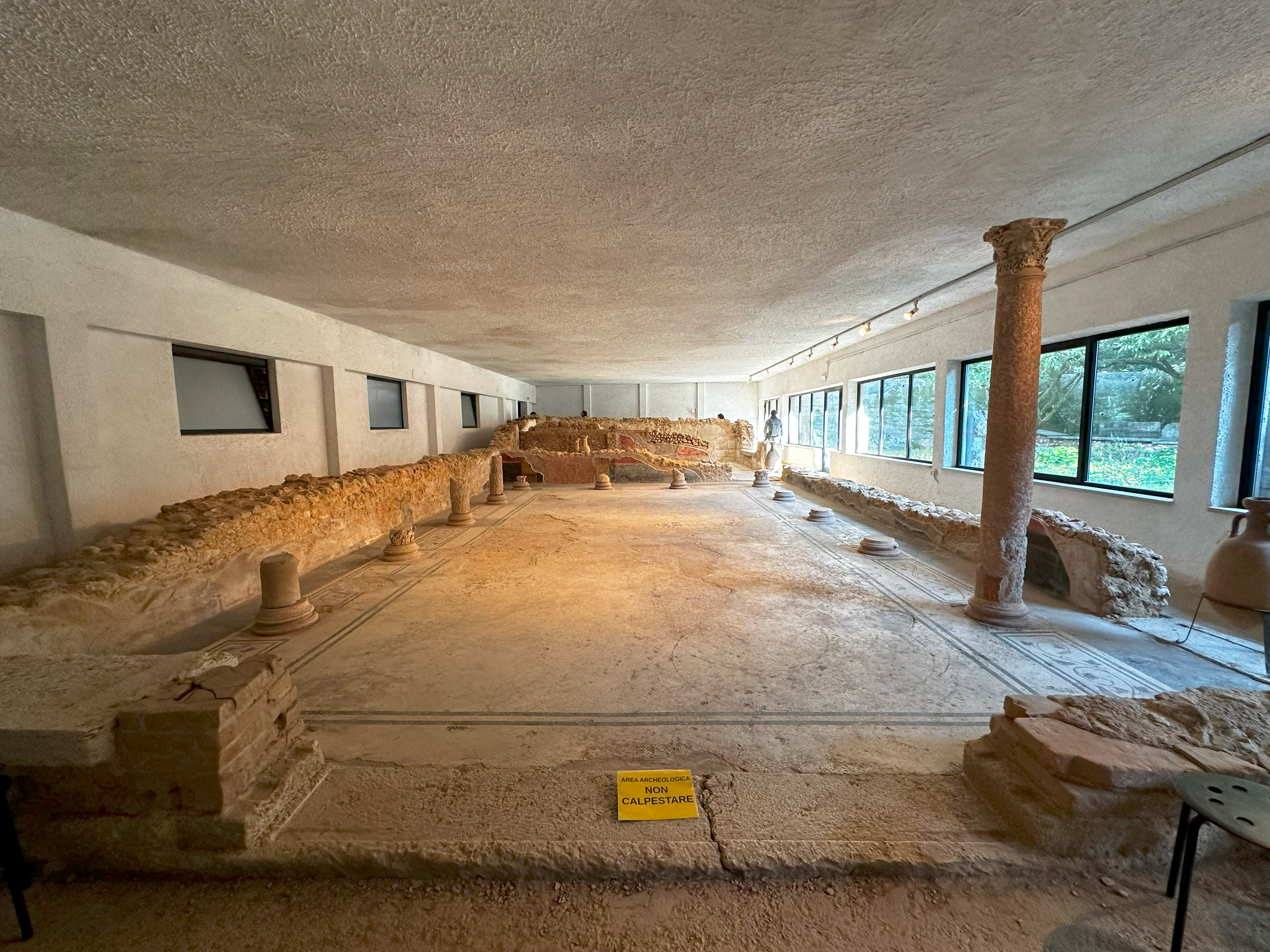
- Interior of the villa
- Interactive map of Valdonega Roman Villa
- 45°27′22.09″N 11°00′08.16″E
- Periods: 1st century
- Cultures: Roman
- Location: Italy, Verona

Site notes
- Discovered: 1957
- Owner: City of Verona
- Management: Superintendence of archaeology, fine arts and landscape for the provinces of Verona, Rovigo and Vicenza
- Public access: Yes
- Website: www.archeoveneto.it

The Valdonega Roman villa is a residence built in the first century A.D. in a suburban area of Roman Verona, in the valley of the same name. From the original structure, which was discovered in 1957 during the construction of an apartment building, three rooms have been preserved. They overlook an L-shaped porch, which probably led to the courtyard or garden.

== Description ==
The luxurious suburban villa, located outside the urban layout of Roman Verona, followed the slope of the landscape and therefore was probably divided into several pavilions placed on many levels, allowing a panoramic view of the city. Of the original villa only three rooms, overlooking a large porch, were found during the excavations that began in 1957, the rest of the original structure is located below modern buildings. The L-shaped porch was probably open to the courtyard or garden of the house, the large windows of the house run along it, while the columns, of which only the bases remain, are placed at irregular distances from each other, to allow the light entrance into the rooms. At the northern end of the porch there are steps that led to rooms located at higher altitudes.

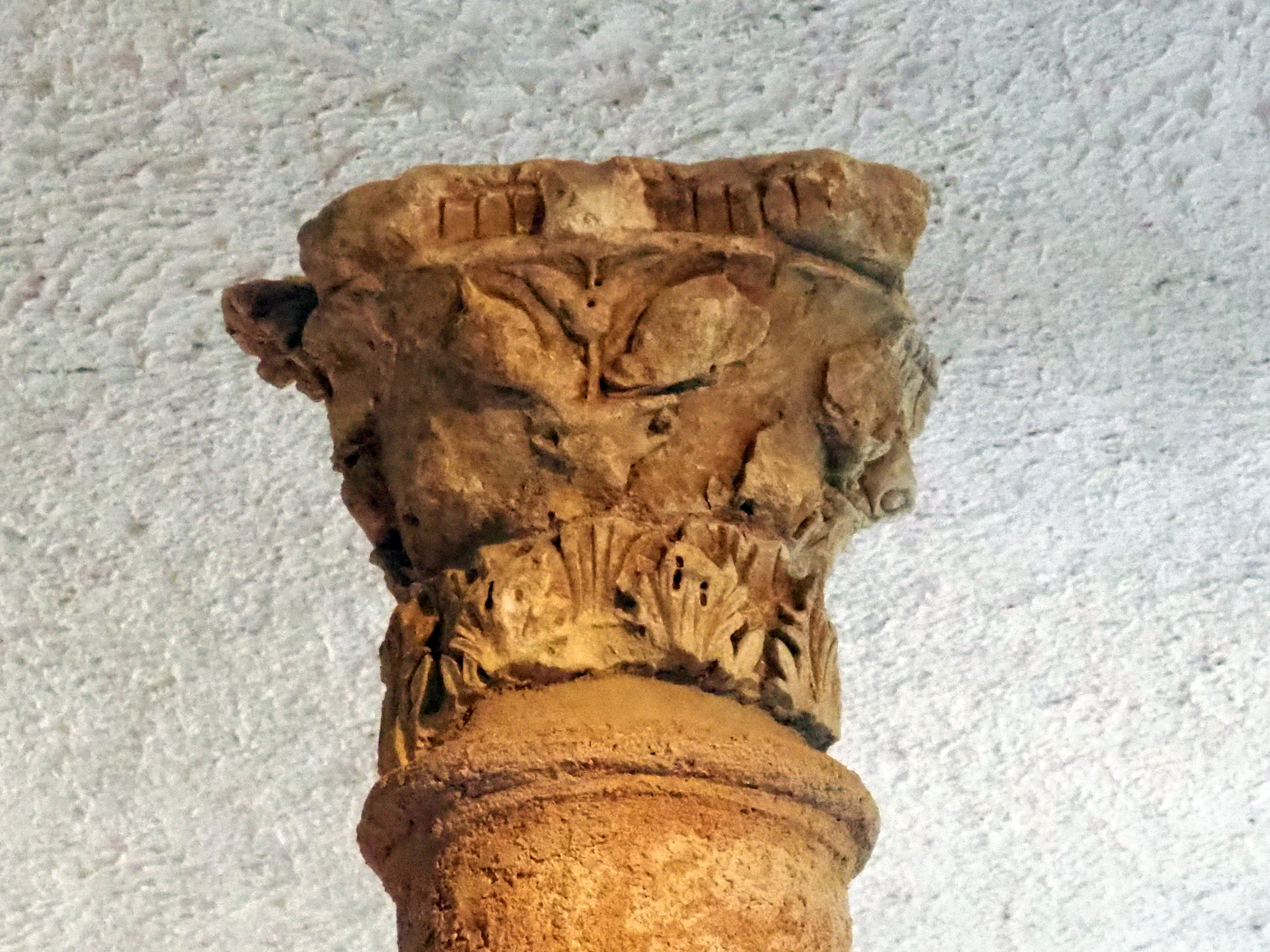
The capital decorated with dolphins that allowed the structure to be dated to the first half of the 1st century.

The main room is a large rectangular chamber intended for a triclinium, that is, the space in which the owner ate with the guests on three beds placed close to the colonnade. This environment is agreed to be a corinthian oecus, a particular type of triclinium that can be found in examples of similar structure and decoration in the domus of Rome and Pompeii. This room had a colonnade on three sides and, on the only side without columns, a door flanked by two windows opened to the South. The columns are made of pink stone with figurative capitals, of which one has been found, decorated with dolphins and dated to the first half of the 1st century. The central part of the room had to be covered by a vault made of woven canes and fixed to the roof above by means of wooden tie rods, while the space between the columns and the perimeter walls was characterized by a flat roof. The room is paved with a mosaic, with black tiles along the perimeter and white in the center, while the spaces between the columns are paved with mosaic panels characterized by polychrome decorations of leaves and birds, and bichrome decorations with various plant figures. On the walls was a fresco depicting a garden.

A second space was separated from the main one by a small transition room, in a way that its only outward view was through a large panoramic window facing the L-shaped porch. This room is also richly decorated: the mosaic floor is white with a black frame along the perimeter, while the walls are frescoed with a white plinth between two red bands, inside of which plants and birds are painted, while in the band above other numerous subjects were depicted, including griffins with cornucopias, female masks and still lifes.

The two rooms and the transition space are flanked by a long and narrow compartment without openings, hypothetically a service space intended to isolate the inhabited areas from the humidity of the hill's terrain.

== Bibliography ==
- Bolla, Margherita (2000). Archeologia a Verona. Milan: Electa.
- Bolla, Margherita (2014). Verona Romana. Sommacampagna: Cierre. ISBN 978-88-8314-771-5.
- Cavalieri Manasse, Giuliana (1987). Il Veneto nell'età romana: Note di urbanistica e di archeologia del territorio. Verona: Banca Popolare di Verona.
