= Manius =

Manius (originally abbreviated ꟿ, in modern times M') was an uncommon Roman praenomen. It might have been derived from Latin word mane 'morning' and meant "born in the morning", but might also have been related to the manes, underworld deities sometimes associated with the souls of the dead, an association that could explain the limited use of the name.

Some notable Romans given this praenomen included:

- Manius Valerius Maximus, dictator in 494 BC, triumphed over the Sabines
- Manius Valerius Maximus Corvinus Messalla, consul in 263 BC, during the First Punic War
- Manius Curius Dentatus, consul three times in the early third century BC, triumphed over both the Samnites and Sabines
- Manius Acilius Glabrio (consul 191 BC), Roman general and consul in 191 BC, during the war with Antiochus
- Manius Acilius Glabrio, consul in 67 BC, during the war with Mithridates
- Manius Acilius Glabrio (consul 91), consul in AD 91, was put to death by Domitian
