= 1st century =

One hundred years, from AD 1 to AD 100

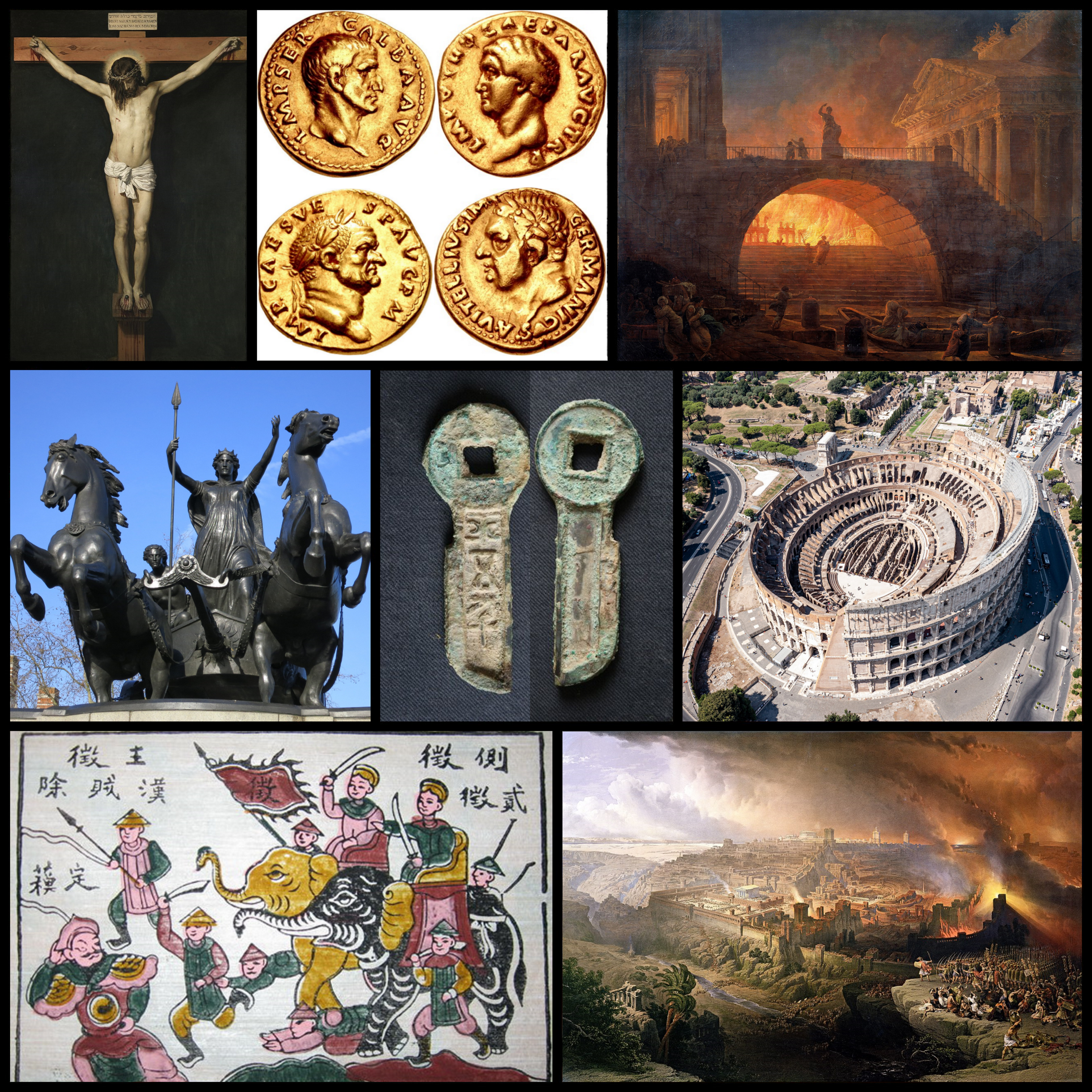
From top left, clockwise: Jesus is crucified by Roman authorities in Judaea (17th century painting). Four different men (Galba, Otho, Vitellius, and Vespasian) claim the title of Emperor within the span of a year; The Great Fire of Rome (18th-century painting) sees the destruction of two-thirds of the city, precipitating the empire's first persecution against Christians, who are blamed for the disaster; The Roman Colosseum is built and holds its inaugural games; Roman forces besiege Jerusalem during the First Jewish–Roman War (19th-century painting); The Trưng sisters lead a rebellion against the Chinese Han dynasty (anachronistic depiction); Boudica, queen of the British Iceni leads a rebellion against Rome (19th-century statue); Knife-shaped coin of the Xin dynasty.

The 1st century was the century spanning AD 1 (represented by the Roman numeral I) through AD 100 (C) according to the Julian calendar. It is often written as the 1st century AD or 1st century CE to distinguish it from the 1st century BC (or BCE) which preceded it. The 1st century is considered part of the Classical era, epoch, or historical period. The Roman Empire, Han China and Parthia were the most powerful and hegemonic states.

During this century, the Roman Empire (ruled by the Julio-Claudian and Flavian dynasties) continued to be in a period of relative stability known as Pax Romana, withstanding a financial crisis in 33 and a civil war in 69. In Europe, Rome expanded into Britain and fought wars in Germania and Dacia. In Africa, Rome was challenged by Tacfarinas, who led his own Musulamii tribe and a loose and changing coalition of other Berber tribes before being defeated in 24. In West Asia, Rome defeated a Jewish rebellion (66–73) and fought a war with Parthia from 58 to 63, though the latter conflict was inconclusive. In East Asia, the Chinese Western Han dynasty was overthrown and replaced by the Xin dynasty in 9, which in turn faced its own rebel movements (namely the Red Eyebrows and Lulin), and was replaced by the Eastern Han dynasty in 25. The Eastern Han dynasty then faced and quelled a rebellion by the Trưng sisters (40–43). In 58, the Eastern Han dynasty entered a golden age with the Rule of Ming and Zhang, who were generally regarded as able administrators who cared about the common welfare of the people and who promoted officials with integrity. On its northern frontier, the Chinese dynasties waged intermittent war with the Xiongnu before emerging victorious in 91. The states of Funan and Xianbei were also established in this century.

The century saw the origination of Christianity from Judea. In the early 30s, Roman governor Pontius Pilate sentenced Jesus to crucifixion; his suffering and redemptive death by crucifixion would become central aspects of Christian theology concerning the doctrines of salvation and atonement. Anti-Jewish riots broke out in Alexandria in 38. In 64, the Great Fire of Rome destroyed two-thirds of the city, precipitating the empire's first persecution of Christians, who were blamed for the disaster. Later in 70, the siege and subsequent sack of Jerusalem and the Second Temple during the First Jewish–Roman War marked a major turning point in Jewish history. The loss of mother-city and temple necessitated a reshaping of Jewish culture to ensure its survival. Judaism's Temple-based sects, including the priesthood and the Sadducees, diminished in importance. Second Temple Judaism came to an end, while a new form of Judaism that became known as Rabbinic Judaism developed out of the Pharisaic school. Furthermore, the White Horse Temple, the first Buddhist temple in China, was traditionally constructed in 68, though it is not recorded in contemporary sources before 289.

Several natural disasters took place in this century. In 17, an earthquake struck the region of Lydia in the Roman province of Asia in Asia Minor (now part of Turkey), causing the destruction of at least 12 cities, with Sardis being most affected. Around 44 to 48, a famine took place in Judea, precipitating assistance by Helena of Adiabene and her son, Izates II. In 62, an earthquake of an estimated magnitude of between 5 and 6 and a maximum intensity of IX or X on the Mercalli scale struck the towns of Pompeii and Herculaneum, severely damaging them; damage to some buildings in Naples and Nuceria was also reported. In 79, Mount Vesuvius violently spewed forth a deadly cloud of super-heated tephra and gases to a height of 33 km (21 mi), ejecting molten rock, pulverized pumice and hot ash. The event destroyed several towns and minor settlements in the area, at the time part of the Roman Empire, with Pompeii and Herculaneum being the most famous examples. The total population of both cities was over twenty thousand. The remains of over 1,500 people have been found at Pompeii and Herculaneum so far, although the total death toll from the eruption remains unknown. Death toll estimates range from 13,000 to 16,000.

== Regional politics ==
- Western Europe: Celtic, Germanic, Saami and Finnic tribal chiefdom and the Roman Empire
- Eastern Europe: Roman Empire, Dacian, Sarmatian, Venedae and Balt tribal chiefdoms
- North Africa: Roman Empire, Garamantes, Mauri, Libyan and Gaetulian tribal chiefdoms
- West Africa: Gur, Kwa, Soninke and Mande tribal chiefdoms
- Central Africa: Bantu tribes, collapsing Nok culture, Nok civilization
- East Africa: Kingdom of Kush, Kingdom of Blemmyes, Kingdom of Aksum
- Southern Africa: Bantu tribes, Khoisan
- Western Asia: Roman and Parthian Empires, Sabaean and Arabian Kingdoms
- Central Asia: Kushan Empire, Sarmatian, Dahae and other Iranian tribal chiefdoms
- South Asia: Kushan Empire, Western Satraps, Satavahana Empire, Dravidian Kingdoms, Kingdom of Kalinga, Indo-Parthian Kingdom, Zhangzhung
- Southeast Asia: Mandala of city-states, Kingdom of Funan
- East Asia: Han dynasty, Yamatai, Xiongnu and Xianbei tribal chiefdoms, Three Kingdoms of Korea (Goguryeo, Baekje and Silla)
- Central America: Mayan, Teotihuacan and Zapotec civilizations
- South America: Nazca, Moche civilizations, Tairona tribal chiefdoms

== Events ==
=== 0s ===
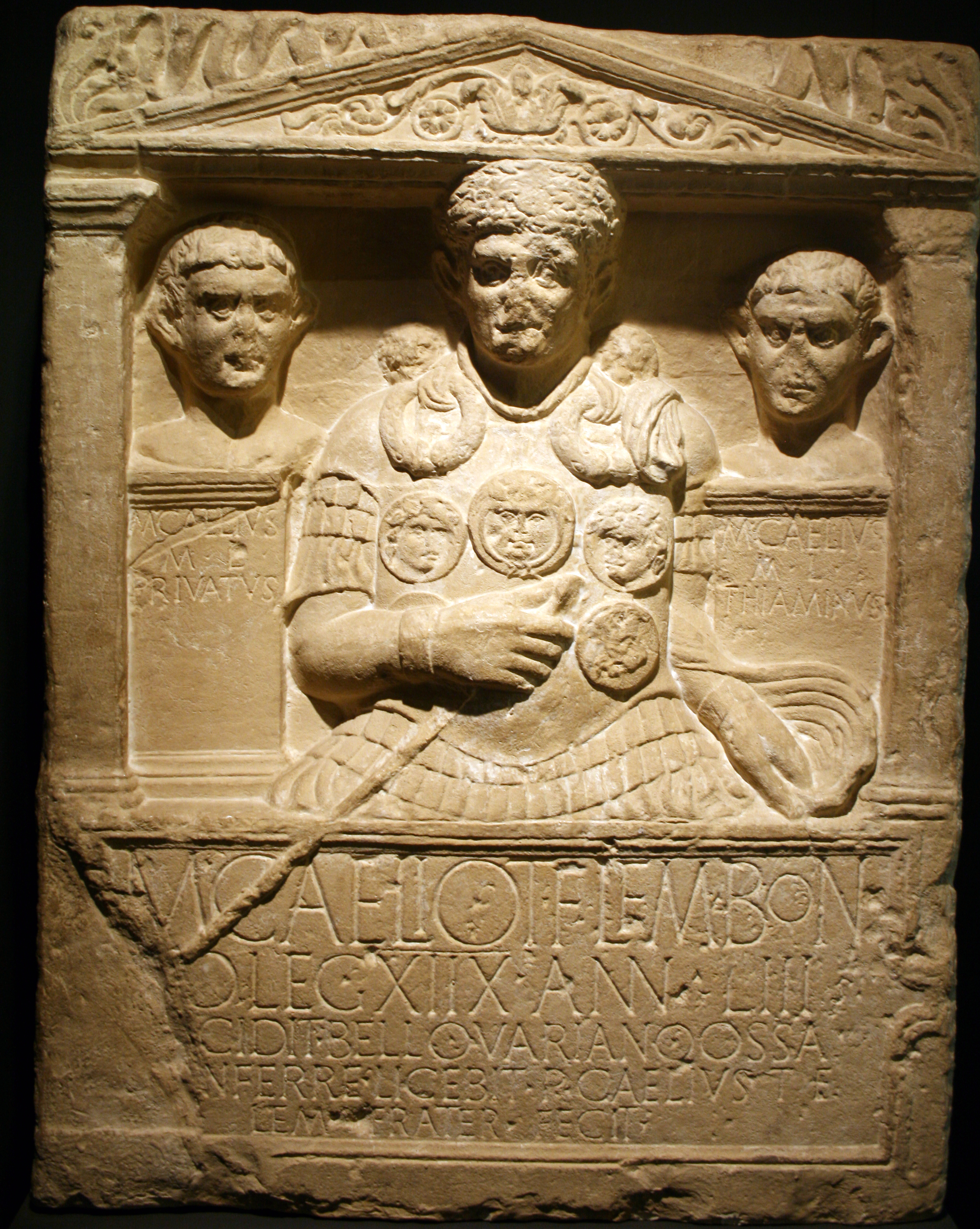
Cenotaph of a centurion who died in the Battle of the Teutoburg Forest (AD 9). Teutoburg Forest is commonly seen as one of the most important defeats in Roman history, bringing the triumphant period of expansion under Augustus to an abrupt end. The outcome of this battle dissuaded the Romans from their ambition of conquering Germania, and is thus considered one of the most important events in European history.

The 0s began on January 1, AD 1 and ended on December 31, AD 9, covering the first nine years of the Common Era.

In Europe, the 0s saw the continuation of conflict between the Roman Empire and Germanic tribes in the Early Imperial campaigns in Germania. Vinicius, Tiberius and Varus led Roman forces in multiple punitive campaigns, before sustaining a major defeat at the hands of Arminius in the Battle of the Teutoburg Forest. Concurrently, the Roman Empire fought the Bellum Batonianum against a rebelling alliance of native peoples led by Bato the Daesitiate in Illyricum, which was suppressed in AD 9. A conflict also took place in Korea, where Daeso, King of Dongbuyeo invaded Goguryeo with a 50,000-man army in AD 6. He was forced to retreat when heavy snow began to fall, stopping the conflict until the next decade. In China, the last ruler of the Chinese Western Han dynasty (Ruzi Ying) was deposed, allowing Wang Mang to establish the Xin dynasty.

Literary works from the 0s include works from the ancient Roman poet Ovid; the Ars Amatoria, an instructional elegy series in three books, Metamorphoses, a poem which chronicles the history of the world from its creation to the deification of Julius Caesar within a loose mythico-historical framework, and Ibis, a curse poem written during his years in exile across the Black Sea for an offense against Augustus. Nicolaus of Damascus wrote the 15-volume History of the World.

Estimates for the world population by AD 1 range from 170 to 300 million. A census was concluded in China in AD 2: final numbers showed a population of nearly 60 million (59,594,978 people in slightly more than 12 million households). The census is one of the most accurate surveys in Chinese history. (Full article...)

=== 10s ===
Bust of Roman emperor Tiberius (r. 14–37), who reigned for most of the decade.

The 10s decade ran from January 1, AD 10, to December 31, AD 19.

In Europe, the decade saw the end of the Early Imperial campaigns in Germania when Roman forces led by Germanicus defeated Germanic tribes in the Battle of Idistaviso in AD 16. In the subsequent year, a war broke out between Maroboduus and Arminius. In Africa, Tacfarinas led his own Musulamii tribe and a loose and changing coalition of other Berber tribes in a war against the Romans in North Africa during the rule of the emperor Tiberius (AD 14–37). The Armenian Artaxiad dynasty was overthrown by the Romans. In China, the Red Eyebrows Rebellion erupted against Wang Mang, emperor of the Xin dynasty. In Korea, Daeso, the ruler of the kingdom of Dongbuyeo, led his armies into Goguryeo once again. This time, Muhyul, a prince of Goguryeo, led the armies of Goguryeo in a well-planned ambush and slaughtered all of Daeso's army. Only he and a few of his men escaped home.

Literary works from the 10s include works from the ancient Roman poet Ovid, Tristia and Epistulae ex Ponto, while Nicolaus of Damascus wrote a biography of Emperor Augustus (Bios Kaisaros).

In the Roman Empire, an edict was issued effecting an empire-wide ban on divinatory practices especially astrology. The edict requires any consultation between a customer and a practitioner to be conducted with at least one third party witness present and bans inquiry into anyone's death. A large earthquake caused the destruction of at least twelve cities in the region of Lydia in the Roman province of Asia in Asia Minor. In China, a major flooding took place in the Yellow River in AD 11, which is credited with helping bring about the fall of the Xin dynasty in the next decade.

Manning (2008) tentatively estimates the world population in AD 10 as 241 million. (Full article...)

=== 20s ===
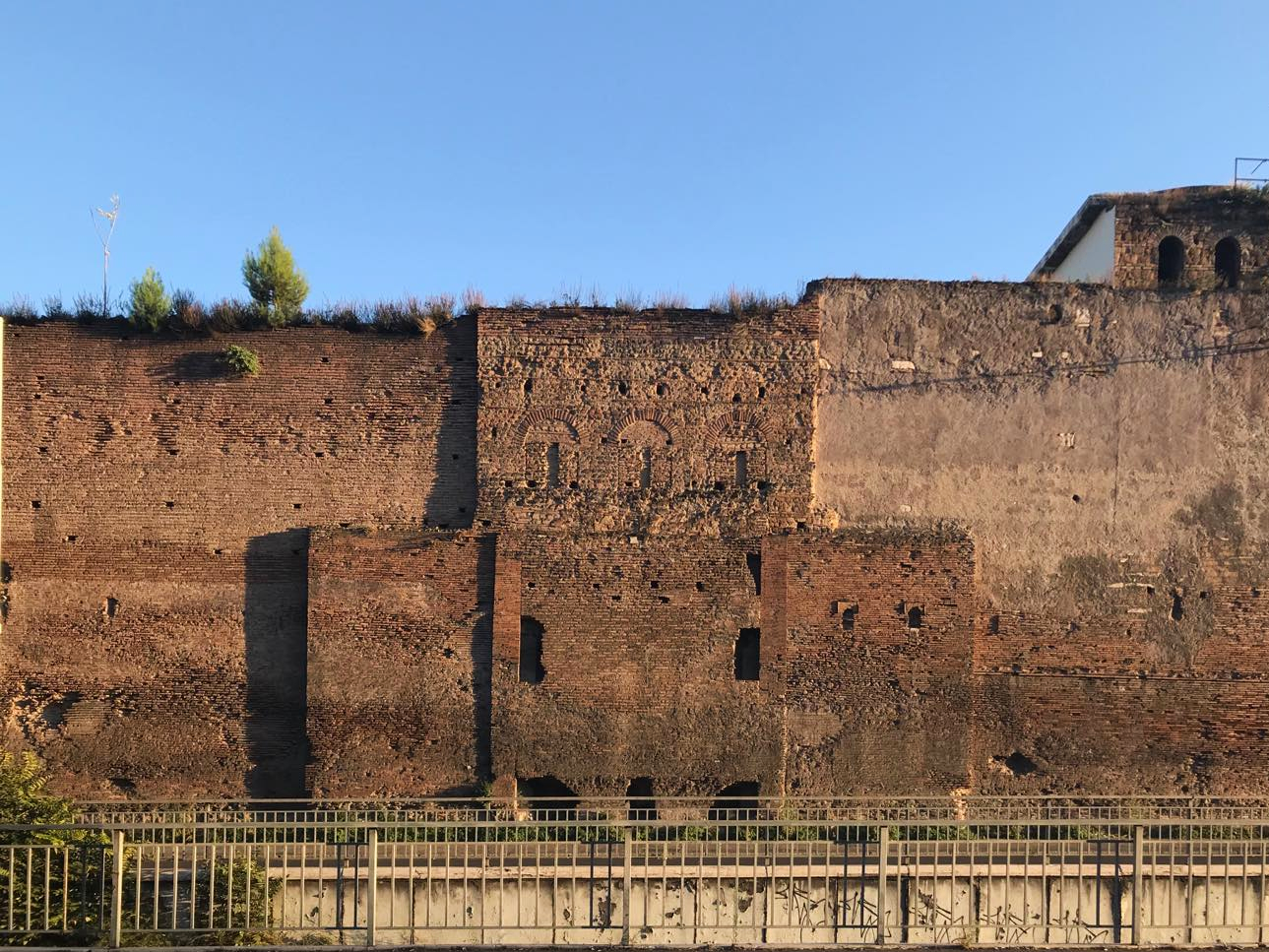
Remains of the Castra Praetoria, built in 23 AD by Lucius Aelius Sejanus

The 20s decade ran from January 1, AD 20, to December 31, AD 29.

In Europe, the 20s saw revolts by the Aedui, Thracian tribesmen, and the Frisians against the Roman Empire. In North Africa, Tacfarinas, a Numidian Berber deserter, led the Musulamii tribe and a loose and changing coalition of other Berber tribes in revolt, before being defeated in AD 24. In China, the Xin dynasty collapsed and the Eastern Han dynasty was established. In Korea, Daemusin of Goguryeo annexed Dongbuyeo and killed its king Daeso.

In science, the 20s saw the manufacture of pens and metal writing tools in Rome. Major disasters of this decade include a fire in Rome, and the collapse of a poorly built amphitheatre in Fidenae, which killed 20,000 of the 50,000 spectators. In 27, Christianity originates from Judaea as a Jewish Christian sect of the Second Temple Judaism. Geographica, an encyclopedia of geographical knowledge created by Strabo, was finished no later than AD 23.

Manning (2008) tentatively estimates the world population in AD 20 as 246 million. (Full article...)

=== 30s ===
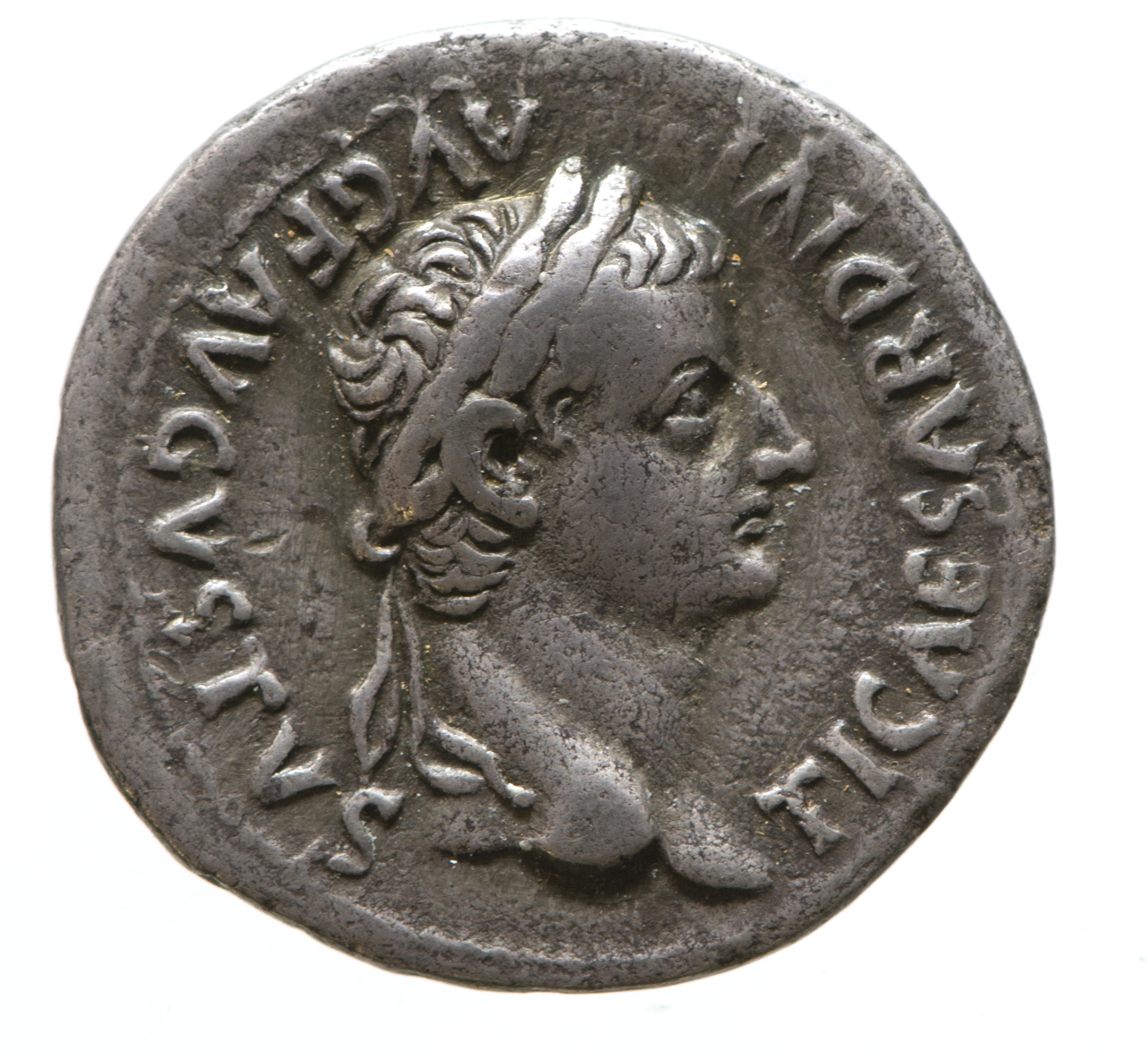
A denarius of Tiberius (r. 14–37). Due to a financial crisis that hit Rome in AD 33, coins such as these came in short supply.

The 30s decade ran from January 1, AD 30, to December 31, AD 39.

Jesus was crucified early in the decade, an event generally accepted by historians; the understanding of his suffering and death as redemptive developed later as a central element of Christian teachings on salvation and atonement. Peter the Apostle founded the Church of Antioch. Anti-Jewish riots broke out in Alexandria. A financial crisis hit Rome in AD 33.

In Asia, the Western Satraps and Kushan Empire emerged. In Europe, the 30s saw a Dacian revolt against the Sarmatian tribe of Iazyges, who had enslaved them, and a Samaritan uprising. In west Asia, Artabanus II of Parthia fought a war with Rome over Armenia. The Han dynasty saw the outbreak of the Rebellion of Gongsun Shu. Roman emperor Tiberius died in AD 37, being succeeded by Caligula.

An earthquake that shook Antioch in AD 37 caused the emperor Caligula to send two senators to report on the condition of the city. In China, an epidemic broke out in K'aui-chi, causing many deaths, and Imperial official Ch'ung-li I (Zhongli Yi) provided medicine that saved many lives.

Valerius Maximus wrote Factorum ac dictorum memorabilium libri IX: It is a collection of approximately a thousand short stories that Valerius wrote during the reign of Tiberius (42 BC – AD 37). Other literary works from the 30s include a popular collection of fables written by Phaedrus, a symbolic interpretation of the Old Testament (Allegory) written by Philo, and a general history of the countries known in Antiquity written by Velleius Paterculus.

Manning (2008) tentatively estimates the world population in AD 30 as 247 million. (Full article...)

=== 40s ===
(Full article...)

=== 50s ===
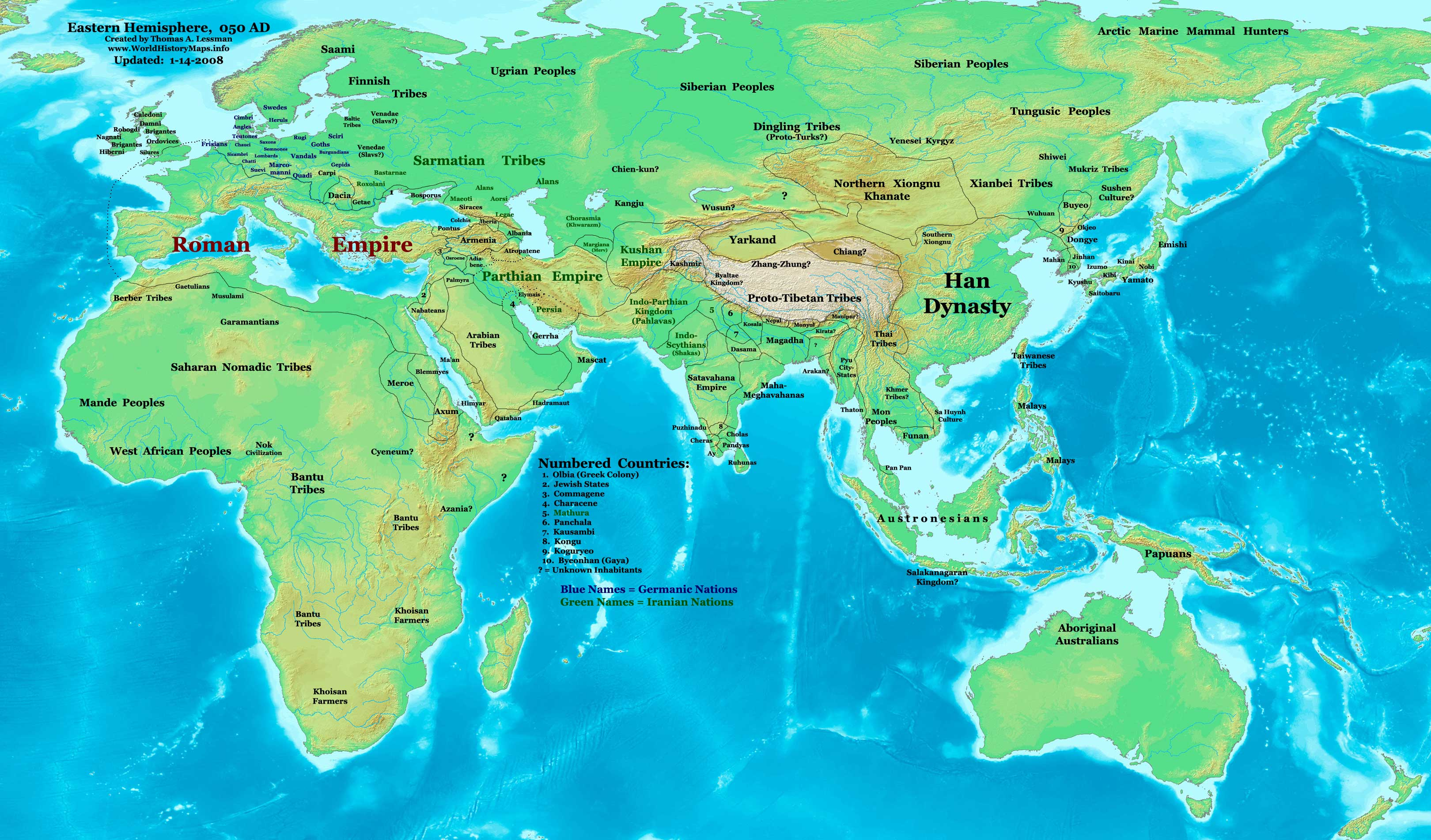
Eastern Hemisphere in AD 50.

The 50s decade ran from January 1, 50, to December 31, 59. It was the sixth decade in the Anno Domini/Common Era, if the nine-year period from 1 AD to 9 AD is considered as a "decade".

The early years of the decade saw Roman and Parthian intervention in the Iberian–Armenian War, a conflict which led Tiridates I to become King of Armenia with Parthian support. This was unacceptable to Rome, and the ensuing tensions culminated in the Roman–Parthian War of 58–63. Concurrently, the Roman conquest of Britain continued, with Caratacus being defeated in 50 and tribes of modern Wales being subdued in 58 to 59. In 50, the Southern Xiongnu submitted to the Chinese Han dynasty. Later in 57, the ascension of Emperor Ming heralded the beginning of a golden age.

The Council of Jerusalem was held early in the decade: The council decided that Gentile converts to Christianity were not obligated to keep most of the fasts, and other specific rituals, including the rules concerning circumcision of males. The Council did, however, retain the prohibitions on eating blood, meat containing blood, and meat of animals that were strangled, and on fornication and idolatry.

Literary works of this decade include De Vita Beata (which explains that the pursuit of happiness is the pursuit of reason) and De Clementia (an instructional contrast between the good ruler and a tyrant), both of which were written by Seneca the Younger.

Manning (2008) tentatively estimates the world population in AD 50 as 248 million. (Full article...)

=== 60s ===
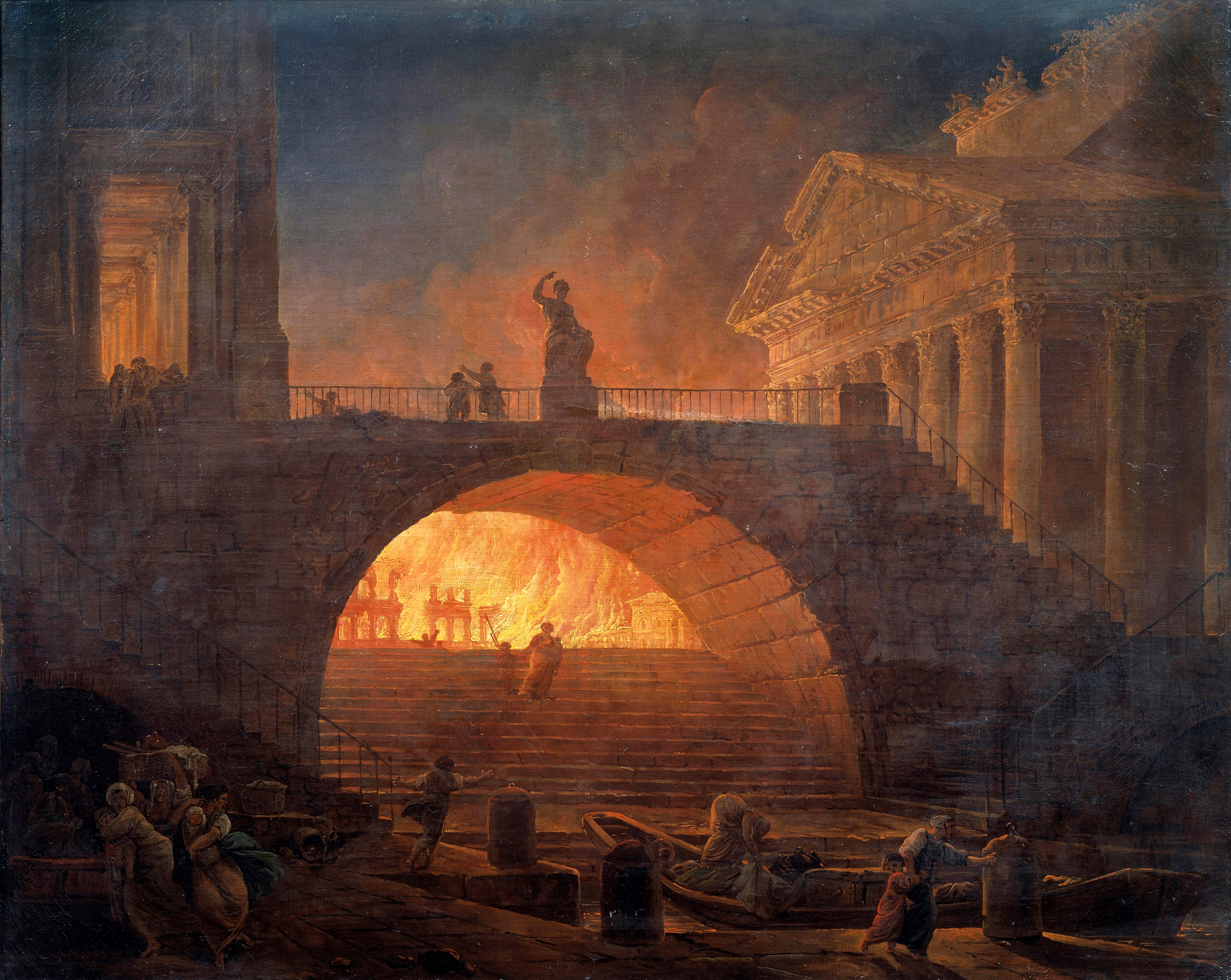
18th-century painting of the Great Fire of Rome, which saw the destruction of two-thirds of the city. The fire precipitated the empire's first persecution against Christians, who were blamed for the disaster.

The 60s decade ran from January 1, AD 60, to December 31, AD 69.

In the Roman Empire, the early part of the decade saw the beginning of the Boudican Revolt in Britannia, where several tribes (chiefly the Iceni), led by Boudica, rebelled against the Roman occupation. The revolt led to the sacking of several Roman cities, but was ultimately quelled by governor Gaius Suetonius Paulinus. In 63, the Roman–Parthian War came to an end with the Treaty of Rhandeia. In 66, the First Jewish-Roman War began, as Jewish rebels fought against Roman rule. Near the end of the decade in 69, the Year of the Four Emperors saw a period of civil war and political instability in the Roman Empire, as four different men (Galba, Otho, Vitellius, and Vespasian) claimed the title of Emperor within the span of a year. Ultimately, the year ended with the ascension of Vespasian to the throne and the beginning of the Flavian Dynasty. In East Asia, the state of Funan was established, while China continued its golden age.

In 62, an earthquake of an estimated magnitude of between 5 and 6 and a maximum intensity of IX or X on the Mercalli scale struck the towns of Pompeii and Herculaneum, severely damaging them. The towns of Pompeii and Herculaneum both suffered major damage, with damage to some buildings also reported from Naples and Nuceria. Seneca reported the death of a flock of 600 sheep that he attributed to the effects of poisonous gases. Later, in 64, the Great Fire of Rome began in the merchant shops around Rome's chariot stadium, Circus Maximus. After six days, the fire was brought under control, but before the damage could be assessed, the fire reignited and burned for another three days. In the aftermath of the fire, two-thirds of Rome had been destroyed. According to Tacitus and later Christian tradition, Emperor Nero blamed the devastation on the Christian community in the city, initiating the empire's first persecution against the Christians.

In the Roman Empire, Christianity continued to spread, despite a campaign of persecution being initiated under Emperor Nero in 64. According to tradition, the apostles Peter and Paul were both martyred during this period: Traditionally, Roman authorities allegedly sentenced Peter to death by crucifixion at Vatican Hill. In accordance with the apocryphal Acts of Peter, he was crucified head down. As for Paul, the Second Epistle to Timothy states that he was arrested in Troad and brought back to Rome, where he was imprisoned and put on trial before being executed. The White Horse Temple, the first Buddhist temple in China, was traditionally constructed in 68, though it is not recorded in contemporary sources before 289.

In 62 or 64, the Baths of Nero were constructed. It stood between the Pantheon and the Stadium of Domitian and were listed among the most notable buildings in the city by Roman authors and became a much-frequented venue. In his final years, Seneca the Younger wrote De Providentia (discussing the problem of evil), De Beneficiis (discussing the award and reception of gifts and favours within society), and compiled a collection of 124 written near the end of his life. After Seneca's death in 65, a play named Octavia was written: the Roman tragedy focuses on three days in the year 62 during which Nero divorced and exiled his wife Claudia Octavia and married another (Poppaea Sabina). The play also deals with the irascibility of Nero and his inability to take heed of the philosopher Seneca's advice to rein in his passions. The Pharsalia, a poem detailing Caesar's civil war (49–45 BC), was also written during this decade.

Manning (2008) tentatively estimates the world population in AD 60 as 249 million. (Full article...)

=== 70s ===
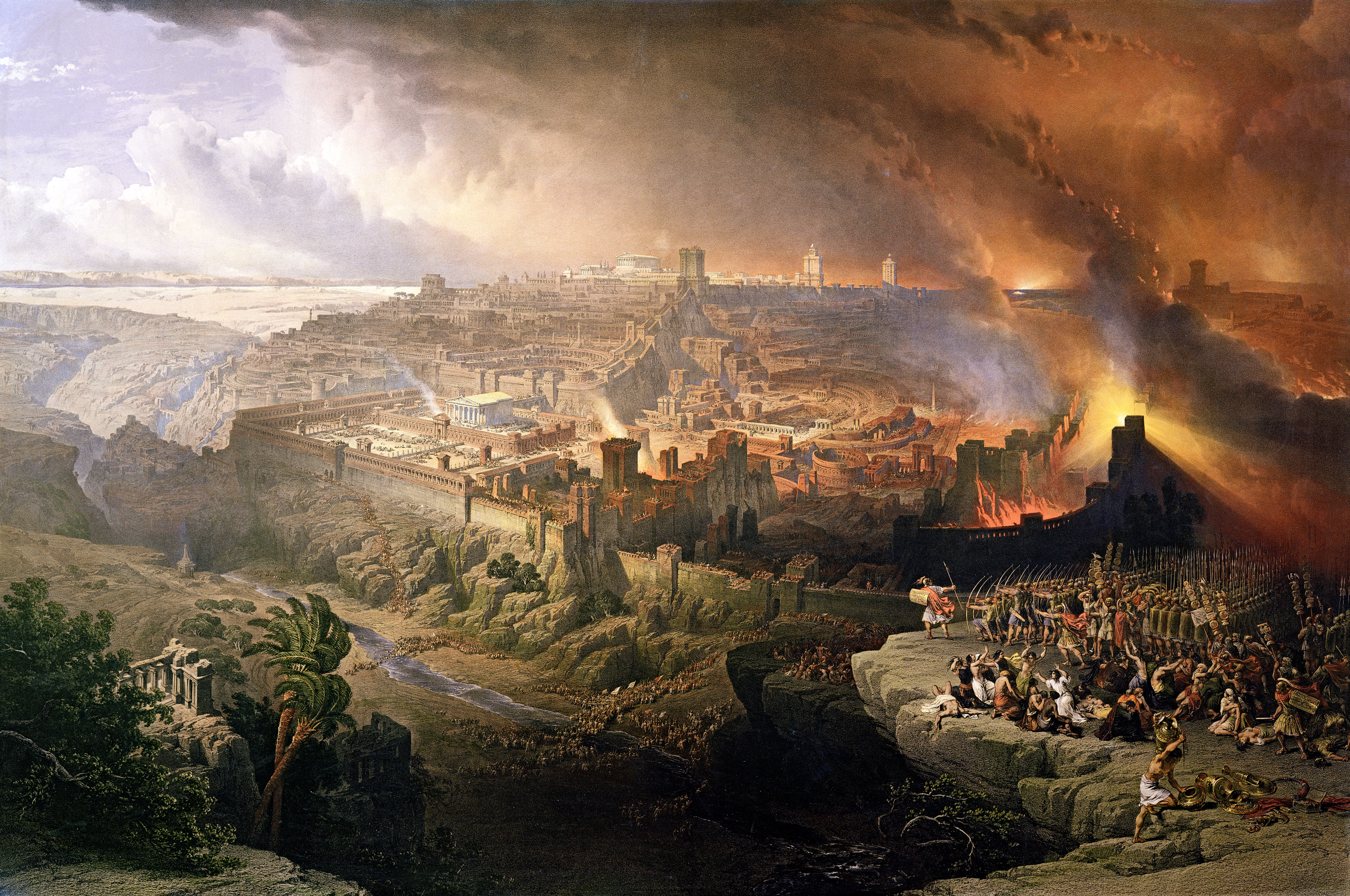
19th-century painting depicting the siege of Jerusalem (70).

The 70s was a decade that ran from January 1, AD 70, to December 31, AD 79.

As the decade began, the First Jewish–Roman War continued: In AD 70, the Romans besieged and sacked Jerusalem and destroyed the Second Temple. After this major victory, the Romans continued to clear pockets of Jewish resistance, with the final stronghold taken being Masada (73). The Flavian dynasty, which included emperors Vespasian and Titus, ruled the empire during this decade. During their reign, the Romans faced military challenges from various sources, including clashes with British and Germanic tribes. However, the Romans were largely successful in defeating these tribes, expanding their territories and consolidating their power. Following the death of Vologases I in 78, Parthia saw internal conflict as Vologases II and Pacorus II competed for the throne. In China, the Han–Xiongnu War was re-invigorated, with the Han defeating the Northern Xiongnu in the Battle of Yiwulu (73). In 75, Emperor Ming of Han died, being succeeded by Emperor Zhang: the reign of these two emperors is considered to have been a golden age.

The destruction of Jerusalem and the Second Temple during the First Jewish–Roman War marked a major turning point in Jewish history. The loss of mother-city and temple necessitated a reshaping of Jewish culture to ensure its survival. Judaism's Temple-based sects, including the priesthood and the Sadducees, diminished in importance. A new form of Judaism that became known as Rabbinic Judaism developed out of Pharisaic school and, centuries later, eventually became the mainstream form of the religion. Many followers of Jesus of Nazareth also survived the city's destruction. They spread his teachings across the Roman Empire, giving rise to the new religion of Christianity.

In the autumn of 79, Mount Vesuvius violently spewed forth a deadly cloud of super-heated tephra and gases to a height of 33 km (21 mi), ejecting molten rock, pulverized pumice and hot ash. The event destroyed several towns and minor settlements in the area, at the time part of the Roman Empire. Pompeii and Herculaneum, obliterated and buried underneath massive pyroclastic surges and ashfall deposits, are the most famous examples. The total population of both cities was over 20,000. The remains of over 1,500 people have been found at Pompeii and Herculaneum so far, although the total death toll from the eruption remains unknown.

The period also saw significant architectural and engineering accomplishments, such as the construction of the Colosseum in Rome. In 75, Vespasian erected a colossal statue of Apollo, begun under Nero, and he dedicated a stage of the theatre of Marcellus. Valerius Flaccus wrote the Argonautica, an epic poem. Pliny the Elder composed the 10-volume Natural History, covering topics including astronomy, mathematics, geography, ethnography, anthropology, human physiology, zoology, botany, agriculture, horticulture, pharmacology, mining, mineralogy, sculpture, art, and precious stones.

Manning (2008) tentatively estimates the world population in AD 70 to have been 250 million. (Full article...)

=== 80s ===
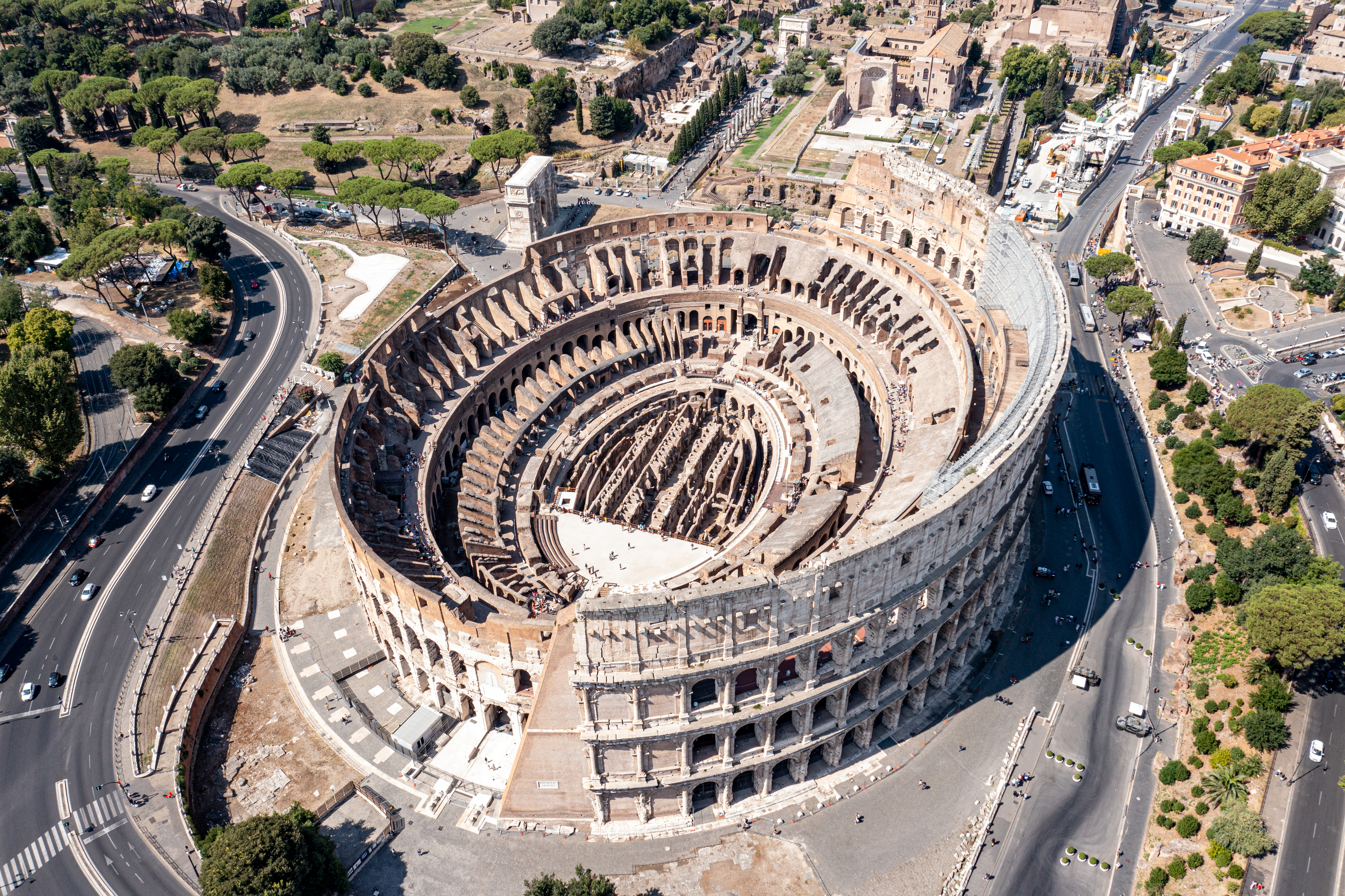
A view of the Colosseum, which held its inaugural games in AD 80.

The 80s was a decade that ran from January 1, AD 80, to December 31, AD 89.

As the decade began, the Parthian Empire was in a phase of division until Pacorus II managed to consolidate his rule, eliminating the two rival contenders for his throne: Vologases II in AD 80 and Artabanus III in AD 81. Domitian became Roman emperor in AD 81: The military campaigns undertaken during his reign were generally defensive in nature, as the Emperor rejected the idea of expansionist warfare. His most significant military contribution was the development of the Limes Germanicus, which encompassed a vast network of roads, forts and watchtowers constructed along the Rhine river to defend the Empire. Nevertheless, several important wars were fought in Gaul, against the Chatti, and across the Danube frontier against the Suebi, the Sarmatians, and the Dacians (see Domitian's Dacian War). In northern Britain, the Romans defeated local tribes in the Battle of Mons Graupius (AD 83). In China, the Han–Xiongnu War continued, with the Battle of the Altai Mountains (AD 89) bringing the Northern Xiongnu to the brink of collapse. The death of Emperor Zhang of Han ended a golden age.

In spring of AD 80, a fire broke out in Rome and burned large parts of the city for three days and three nights. Although the extent of the damage was not as disastrous as during the Great Fire of 64 and crucially spared the many districts of insulae, Cassius Dio records a long list of important public buildings that were destroyed, including Agrippa's Pantheon, the Temple of Jupiter, the Diribitorium, parts of the Theatre of Pompey, and the Saepta Julia among others. Emperor Titus personally compensated for the damaged regions. According to Suetonius, a plague also broke out during the fire. The nature of the disease, however, and the death toll are unknown.

Manning (2008) tentatively estimates the world population in AD 80 to have been 250 million. (Full article...)

=== 90s ===
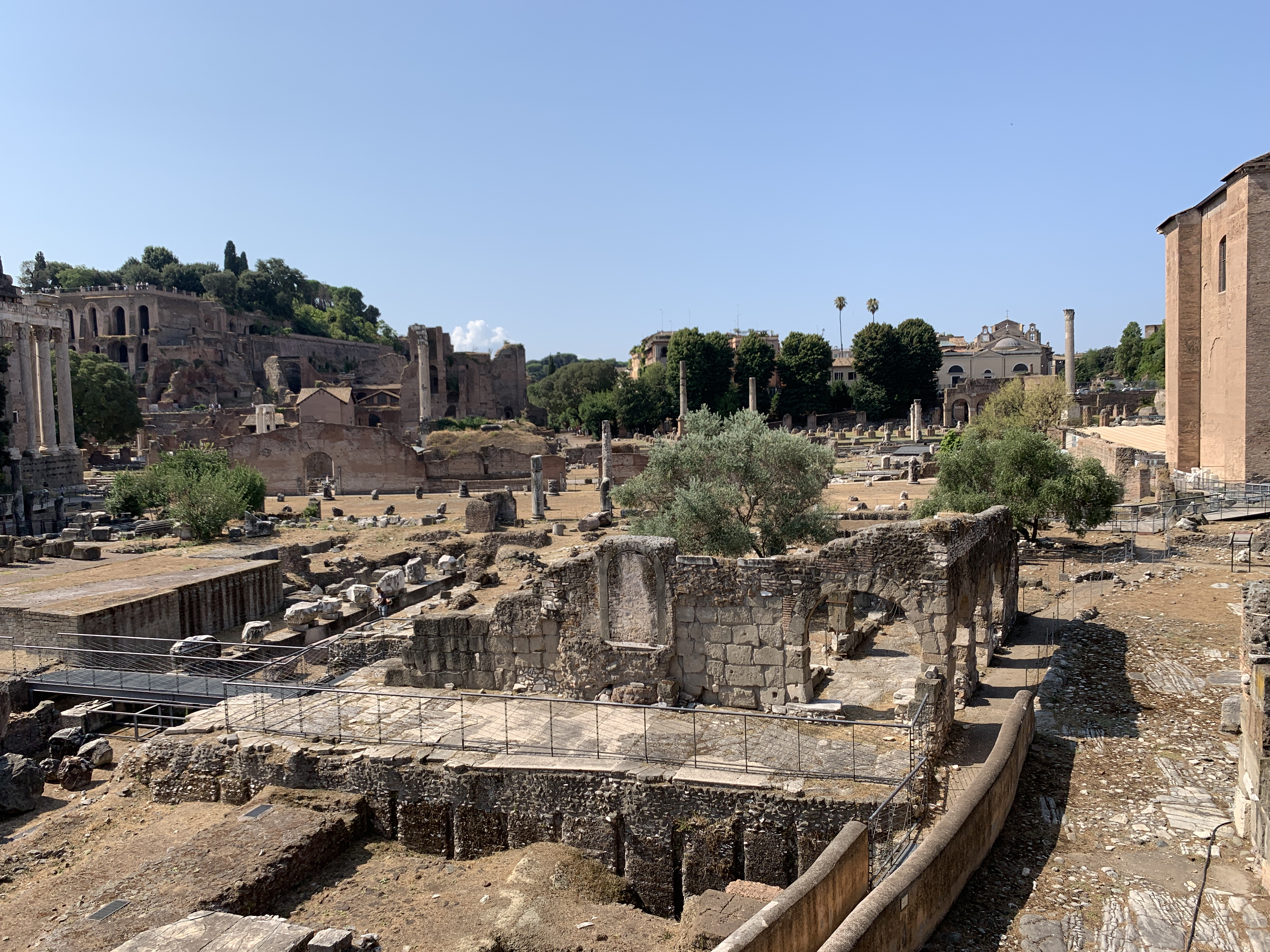
Ruins of the Forum of Nerva, completed in 97

The 90s was a decade that ran from January 1, AD 90, to December 31, AD 99.

As the decade began, the Han–Xiongnu War was approaching its end, with the Xiongnu having been on the verge of collapse since the Battle of the Altai Mountains (89) the prior decade. In 90, Dou Xian dispatched General Geng Kui and Shizi of the Southern Xiongnu with 8000 light cavalry to attack the Northern Chanyu, encamped at Heyun (河雲). There, the Han killed 8000 men and captured several thousands. By 91, the last remnants of the Northern Xiongnu had migrated west towards the Ili River valley, ending the war. After the downfall of the Xiongnu, the Xianbei replaced them with a loose confederacy from 93.

The Roman Empire did not see any significant military action this decade, excepting clashes along the Danube in 92. Economically, the empire saw reforms by Nerva after the death of Domitian in 96, including but not limited to a string of economic reforms intended to alleviate the burden of taxation from the most needy Romans. Before long, Nerva's expenses strained the economy of Rome and, although perhaps not ruinous to the extent once suggested by Syme, necessitated the formation of a special commission of economy to drastically reduce expenditures.

According to some historians, Jews and Christians were heavily persecuted toward the end of Domitian's reign (89-96). The Book of Revelation, which mentions at least one instance of martyrdom (Rev 2:13; cf. 6:9), is thought by many scholars to have been written during Domitian's reign. According to Barnes, "Melito, Tertullian, and Bruttius stated that Domitian persecuted the Christians. Melito and Bruttius vouchsafe no details, Tertullian only that Domitian soon changed his mind and recalled those whom he had exiled". A minority of the historians have maintained that there was little or no anti-Christian activity during Domitian's time. The lack of consensus by historians about the extent of persecution during the reign of Domitian derives from the fact that while accounts of persecution exist, these accounts are cursory or their reliability is debated.

In AD 92, the Flavian Palace was completed. In AD 97, the Forum of Nerva was completed. Josephus wrote Antiquities of the Jews (covering the history of the Jewish people), Against Apion (a defense of Judaism as a classical religion and philosophy against criticism by Apion), and The Life of Flavius Josephus (an autobiographical text where Josephus details his own life). Tacitus wrote Germania (a historical and ethnographic work on the Germanic peoples outside the Roman Empire) and Agricola (which recounts the life of his father-in-law Gnaeus Julius Agricola, an eminent Roman general and governor of Britain). (Full article...)

=== 100 ===
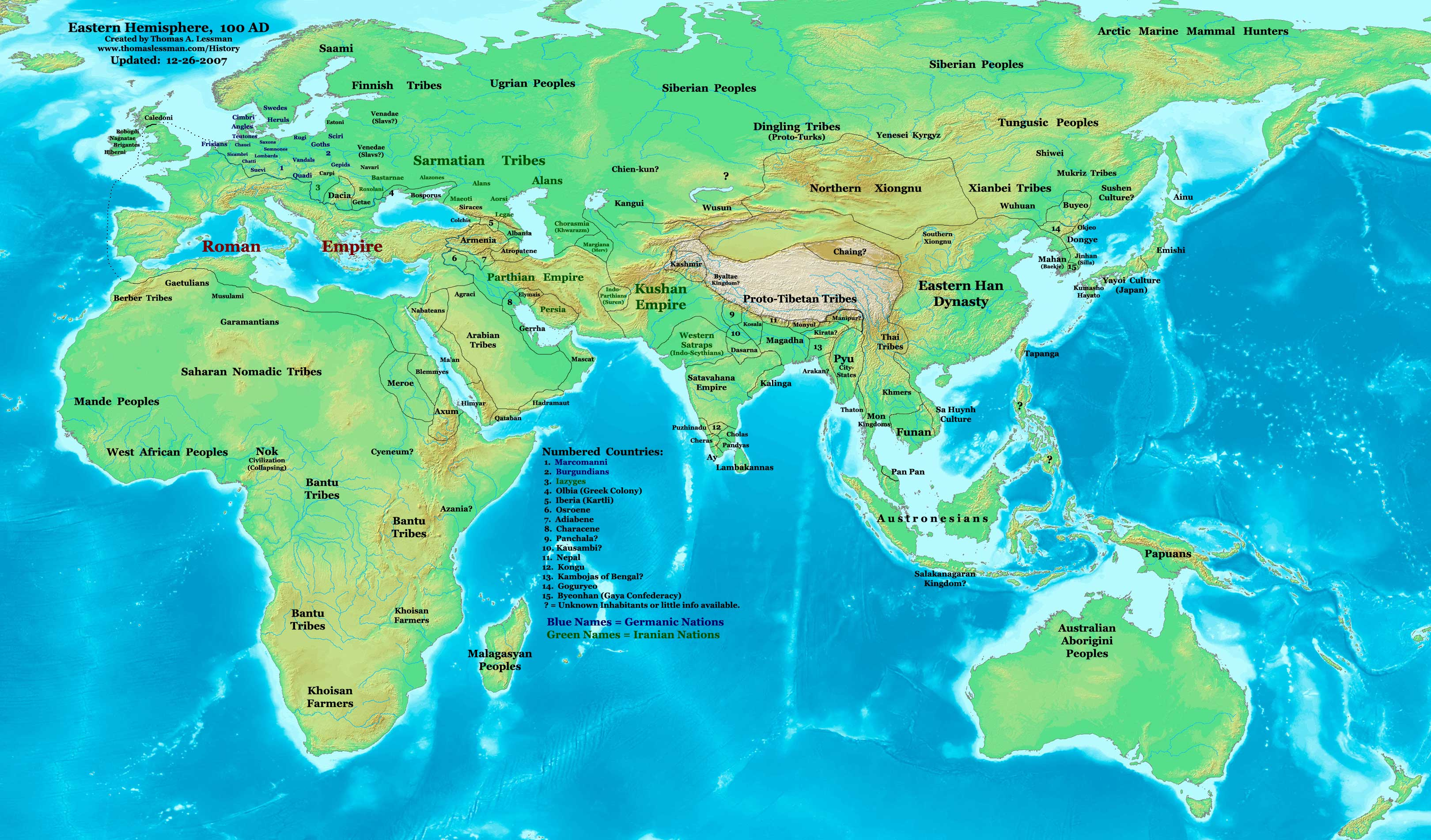
The eastern hemisphere in AD 100

In the Roman Empire, it was sometimes referred to as year 853 ab urbe condita, i.e., 853 years since the founding of Rome in 753 B.C. The denomination AD 100 for this year has been used since the Early Middle Ages, when the Anno Domini calendar era became the prevalent method in Europe for naming years.

This year saw Pacores, the last king of the Indo-Parthian kingdom, ascend to the throne. In the Americas, the Moche culture developed around this time, and Teotihuacan, a major city at the centre of modern-day Mexico, reached a population of around 60,000–80,000. (Full article...)

== Inventions, discoveries, introductions ==
- Codex, the first form of the modern book, appears in the Roman Empire.
- Various inventions by Hero of Alexandria, including the steam turbine (aeolipile), water organ, and various other water-powered machines.
- c. AD 23: the Chinese astronomer Liu Xin dies, he documented 1080 different stars, among other achievements.
- AD 31: the Han dynasty Chinese engineer and statesman Du Shi (d. AD 38) from Nanyang invented the first-known hydraulic-powered bellows to heat the blast furnace in smelting cast iron. He used a complex mechanical device that was powered by the rushing current against a waterwheel, a practice that would continue in China.
- AD 78: the beginning of the Saka Era used by Hindu Vedic calendars.
- c. AD 80: although Philo of Byzantium described the saqiya chain pump in the early 2nd century BC, the square-pallet chain pump was innovated in China during this century, mentioned first by the philosopher Wang Chong around AD 80. Wang Chong also accurately described the water cycle in meteorology, and argued against the mainstream 'radiating influence' theory for solar eclipses, the latter of which was accepted by many, including Zhang Heng.
