= AD 92 =

AD 92 in various calendars
- Gregorian calendar: AD 92; XCII
- Ab urbe condita: 845
- Assyrian calendar: 4842
- Balinese saka calendar: 13–14
- Bengali calendar: −502 – −501
- Berber calendar: 1042
- Buddhist calendar: 636
- Burmese calendar: −546
- Byzantine calendar: 5600–5601
- Chinese calendar: 辛卯年 (Metal Rabbit); 2789 or 2582 — to — 壬辰年 (Water Dragon); 2790 or 2583
- Coptic calendar: −192 – −191
- Discordian calendar: 1258
- Ethiopian calendar: 84–85
- Hebrew calendar: 3852–3853
- Hindu calendars
- Vikram Samvat: 148–149
- Shaka Samvat: 13–14
- Kali Yuga: 3192–3193
- Holocene calendar: 10092
- Iranian calendar: 530 BP – 529 BP
- Islamic calendar: 546 BH – 545 BH
- Javanese calendar: N/A
- Julian calendar: AD 92; XCII
- Korean calendar: 2425
- Minguo calendar: 1820 before ROC 民前1820年
- Nanakshahi calendar: −1376
- Seleucid era: 403/404 AG
- Thai solar calendar: 634–635
- Tibetan calendar: ལྕགས་མོ་ཡོས་ལོ་ (female Iron-Hare); 218 or −163 or −935 — to — ཆུ་ཕོ་འབྲུག་ལོ་ (male Water-Dragon); 219 or −162 or −934

AD 92 (XCII) was a leap year starting on Sunday of the Julian calendar. At the time, it was known as the Year of the Consulship of Augustus and Saturninus (or, less frequently, year 845 Ab urbe condita). The denomination AD 92 for this year has been used since the early medieval period, when the Anno Domini calendar era became the prevalent method in Europe for naming years.

== Events ==
=== By place ===
==== Roman Empire ====
- Emperor Domitian becomes a Roman Consul.
- In spring, several tribes (probably Marcomanni, Quadi, Jazyges) cross the Danube and attack Pannonia, probably destroying Legio XXI Rapax. These tribes are defeated from May to December 92, and chased back over the river. The Romans do not pursue the retreating tribes.
- The Roman army moves into Mesopotamia (modern Syria).
- The Flavian Palace is completed on the Palatine.

== Births ==
- Pope Anicetus

== Deaths ==
- April 9 – Yuan An, Chinese administrator, scholar and statesman
- Antipas of Pergamum, Roman bishop, martyr
- Ban Gu, Chinese historian, poet and writer (b. AD 32)
- Dou Xian, Chinese general and statesman of the Eastern Han dynasty
- Gaius Julius Archelaus Antiochus Epiphanes, prince of Commagene (b. AD 38)
