= AD 116 =

116 in various calendars
- Gregorian calendar: 116; CXVI
- Ab urbe condita: 869
- Assyrian calendar: 4866
- Balinese saka calendar: 37–38
- Bengali calendar: −478 – −477
- Berber calendar: 1066
- Buddhist calendar: 660
- Burmese calendar: −522
- Byzantine calendar: 5624–5625
- Chinese calendar: 乙卯年 (Wood Rabbit); 2813 or 2606 — to — 丙辰年 (Fire Dragon); 2814 or 2607
- Coptic calendar: −168 – −167
- Discordian calendar: 1282
- Ethiopian calendar: 108–109
- Hebrew calendar: 3876–3877
- Hindu calendars
- Vikram Samvat: 172–173
- Shaka Samvat: 37–38
- Kali Yuga: 3216–3217
- Holocene calendar: 10116
- Iranian calendar: 506 BP – 505 BP
- Islamic calendar: 522 BH – 521 BH
- Javanese calendar: N/A
- Julian calendar: 116; CXVI
- Korean calendar: 2449
- Minguo calendar: 1796 before ROC 民前1796年
- Nanakshahi calendar: −1352
- Seleucid era: 427/428 AG
- Thai solar calendar: 658–659
- Tibetan calendar: ཤིང་མོ་ཡོས་ལོ་ (female Wood-Hare); 242 or −139 or −911 — to — མེ་ཕོ་འབྲུག་ལོ་ (male Fire-Dragon); 243 or −138 or −910

Year 116 (CXVI) was a leap year starting on Tuesday of the Julian calendar. At the time, it was known as the Year of the Consulship of Lamia and Vetus (or, less frequently, year 869 Ab urbe condita). The denomination 116 for this year has been used since the early medieval period, when the Anno Domini calendar era became the prevalent method in Europe for naming years.

== Events ==
=== By place ===
==== Roman Empire ====
- Emperor Trajan completes his invasion of Parthia by capturing the cities of Seleucia, Babylon, Ctesiphon and Susa, marking the high-water mark of the Roman Empire's eastern expansion.
- Trajan makes Syria a province of Rome and crosses the Tigris to annex Adiabene. He proceeds with his army to the Persian Gulf and conquers territory that becomes the province of Parthia.
- Trajan removes Osroes I as king of Parthia, and appoints his son Parthamaspates in his place. Parthamaspates romanizes his name to Parthicus.
- Trajan sends two expeditionary forces. One, consisting of elements of Legio III Cyrenaica, to suppress the revolt in Judea and the other Legio VII Claudia to restore order on Cyprus.
- In summer, rebellious movement emerges in Mesopotamia against Roman occupation. General Lusius Quietus is sent by Trajan to suppress the uprisings, recovering Nisibis, besieging and sacking Edessa, and waging war against local Jews
- Trajan sends laureatae to the Roman Senate on account of his victories and being conqueror of Parthia.
- Quintus Marcius Turbo sails to Alexandria and defeats Jewish insurgents in several pitched battles.

== Births ==
- Liang Na, wife of Shun of Han (d. 150)

== Deaths ==
- March 30 – Quirinus of Neuss, Roman Christian martyr according to Roman Catholic tradition
- Abgar VII, ruler of Osroene (approximate date)
- Ban Zhao, female Chinese historian (b. AD 49)
- Philopappos, prince of Commagene (b. AD 65)
- Zacchaeus of Jerusalem, bishop of Jerusalem
