= 30s =

Fourth decade of the first century AD

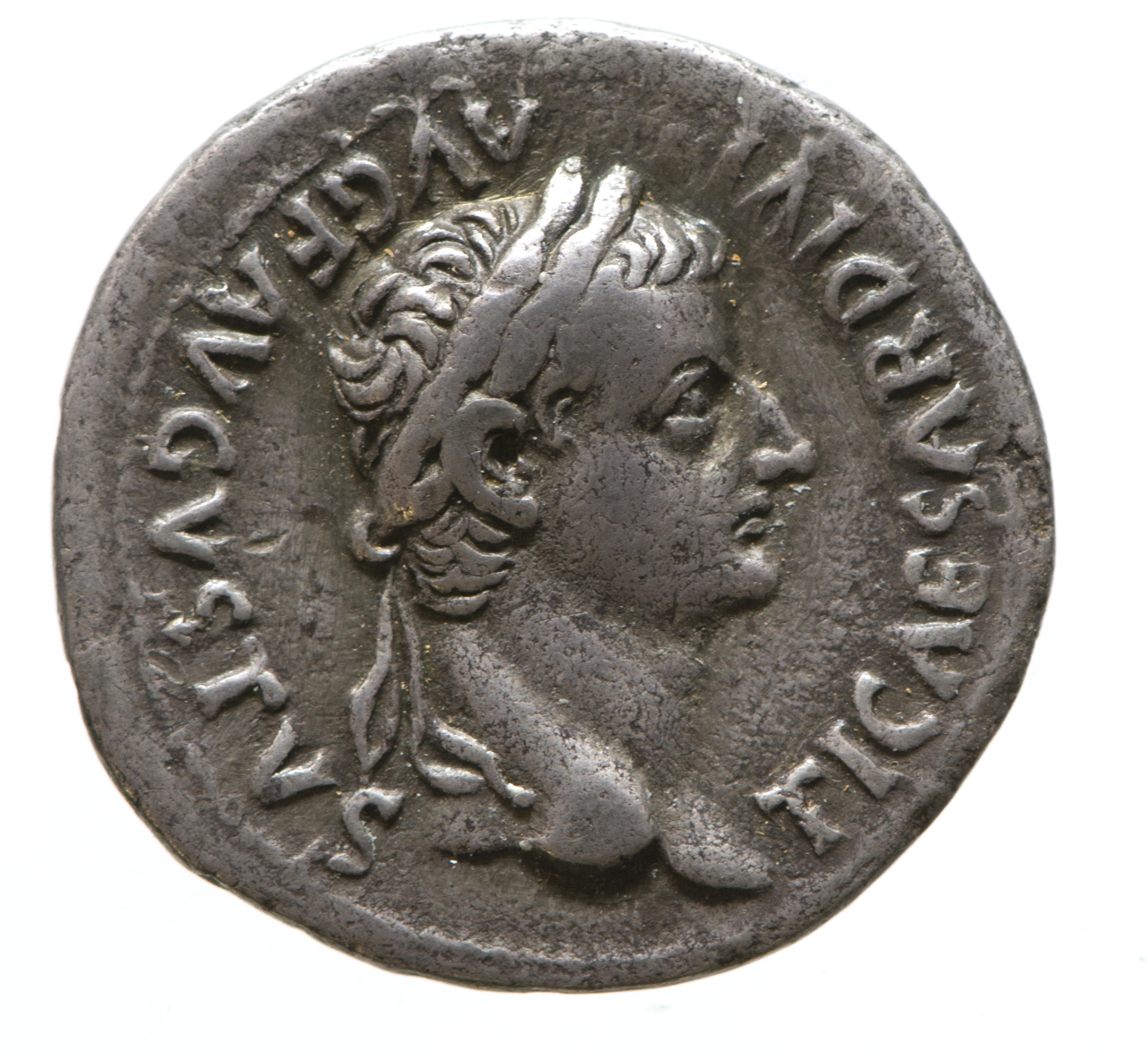
A denarius of Tiberius (r. 14–37). Due to a financial crisis that hit Rome in AD 33, coins such as these came in short supply.

The 30s decade ran from January 1, AD 30, to December 31, AD 39.

Jesus was crucified early in the decade. Peter the Apostle founded the Church of Antioch. Anti-Jewish riots broke out in Alexandria. A financial crisis hit Rome in AD 33.

In Asia, the Western Satraps and Kushan Empire emerged. In Europe, the 30s saw a Dacian revolt against the Sarmatian tribe of Iazyges, who had enslaved them, and a Samaritan uprising. In west Asia, Artabanus II of Parthia fought a war with Rome over Armenia. The Han dynasty saw the outbreak of the Rebellion of Gongsun Shu. Roman emperor Tiberius died in AD 37, being succeeded by Caligula.

An earthquake that shook Antioch in AD 37 caused the emperor Caligula to send two senators to report on the condition of the city. In China, an epidemic broke out in K'aui-chi, causing many deaths, and Imperial official Ch'ung-li I (Zhongli Yi) provided medicine that saved many lives.

Valerius Maximus wrote Factorum ac dictorum memorabilium libri IX: It is a collection of approximately a thousand short stories that Valerius wrote during the reign of Tiberius (42 BC – AD 37). Other literary works from the 30s include a popular collection of fables written by Phaedrus, a symbolic interpretation of the Old Testament (Allegory) written by Philo, and a general history of the countries known in Antiquity written by Velleius Paterculus.

Manning (2008) tentatively estimates the world population in AD 30 as 247 million.

== Demographics ==
Due to lack of reliable demographic data, estimates of the world population in the 1st century vary wildly, with estimates for AD 1 varying from 150 to 300 million. Demographers typically do not attempt to estimate most specific years in antiquity, instead giving approximate numbers for round years such as AD 1 or AD 200. However, attempts at reconstructing the world population in more specific years have been made, with Manning (2008) tentatively estimating the world population in AD 30 as 247 million.

== Events ==
=== 30 AD ===
==== South Asia ====
- The Kushan Empire is founded (approximate date).

==== Roman Empire ====
- Agrippina the Elder (the wife of Germanicus) and two of her sons, Nero Julius Caesar and Drusus Caesar, are arrested and exiled on orders of Lucius Aelius Sejanus (the prefect of the Praetorian Guard), and later starved to death in suspicious circumstances. In Sejanus's purge of Agrippina the Elder and her family, her son Caligula, and her three daughters, Agrippina the Younger, Julia Drusilla and Julia Livilla are the only survivors.
- Phaedrus translates Aesop's fables, and composes some of his own.
- Velleius Paterculus writes the general history of the countries known in Antiquity.

==== Palestine ====
- Jesus is crucified in Jerusalem (possible date)

=== 31 AD ===
==== Roman Empire ====
- Lucius Aelius Sejanus is named co-Consul to Emperor Tiberius. However, Tiberius becomes aware of Sejanus' treachery and has him arrested and executed.
- Naevius Sutorius Macro becomes the leader of the Praetorian Guard after Sejanus is executed.

=== 32 AD ===
==== Egypt ====
- Philo writes his symbolic interpretation of the Old Testament (Allegory).

=== 33 AD ===
==== Roman Empire ====
- Emperor Tiberius founds a credit bank in Rome.
- A financial crisis hits Rome, due to poorly chosen fiscal policies. Land values plummet, and credit is increased. These actions lead to a lack of money, a crisis of confidence, and much land speculation. The primary victims are senators, knights and the wealthy. Many aristocratic families are ruined.

==== China ====
- Although the usurpation of Wang Mang and the Chimei Rebellion are behind him, Emperor Guangwu now faces a new threat to the Han dynasty: the Rebellion of Gongsun Shu in the Sichuan province. Gongsun's naval forces are unsuccessful against Han General Cen Peng, so Gongsun decides to fortify his position by blockading the entire Yangtze River with a large floating pontoon bridge, complete with floating fortified posts. After Cen Peng is unable to break through, he constructs several "castle ships" with high ramparts and ramming vessels known as "colliding swoopers", which break through Gongsun's lines and allow Cen to quell his rebellion. Gongsun Shu is totally defeated three years later.

==== Palestine ====
- According to Colin Humphrey's account, Jesus of Nazareth's Last Supper and crucifixion take place.

=== 34 AD ===
==== Roman Empire ====
- The Roman aqueduct Pont du Gard is constructed, running for 50 km, ending at Nîmes.
- Naevius Sutorius Macro gains favour in the Roman Empire by prostituting his wife Ennia Thrasylla to Caligula.
- Rome intervenes in Armenia (AD 34–37).

==== Europe ====
- The original inhabitants of Dacia revolt against the Sarmatian tribe of Iazyges, who had enslaved them.
- According to one dating scheme, Paul and Barnabas announce in Antioch that they will begin to evangelize the Gentiles.

==== Palestine ====
- Stephen, one of the original seven deacons of the Christian Church, is martyred for his faith (possible date).

==== Syria ====
- Saul of Tarsus, on the road to Damascus, is converted to Christianity, and becomes Paul the Apostle (possible date).

=== 35 AD ===
==== Roman Empire ====
- Emperor Tiberius names Caligula (aka Gaius) and Gamellus, a grandson, as co-heirs.
- Pliny the Elder is brought to Rome before this year.

==== Persia ====
- Tiridates III becomes king of Parthia (until AD 36).

=== 36 AD ===
==== China ====
- December 25 – Wu Han commands the forces of Emperor Guang Wu of the Eastern Han to conquer the separatist Chengjia Empire, reuniting China.

==== Roman Empire ====
- Pontius Pilate is recalled to Rome, after his mismanagement of a Samaritan uprising.
- Lucius Vitellius defeats Artabanus III of Parthia in support of another claimant to the throne, Tiridates III.
- Herod Antipas suffers major losses in a war with Aretas IV of Nabatea, provoked partly by Antipas' divorce of Aretas' daughter. According to Josephus, Herod's defeat was popularly believed to be divine punishment for his execution of John the Baptist. Emperor Tiberius orders his governor of Syria, Vitellius, to capture or kill Aretas, but he is reluctant to support Herod and abandons his campaign upon Tiberius' death in AD 37.

==== Palestine ====
- Marcellus becomes governor of Judaea and Samaria.

=== 37 AD ===
==== Roman Empire ====
- March 18 – The Roman Senate annuls Tiberius's will, and proclaims Caligula as Roman Emperor, nullifying the joint claim of Tiberius Gemellus. Caligula's attempt to have himself deified creates friction between himself and the Senate.
- October – Caligula becomes seriously ill, or perhaps is poisoned. He recovers from his illness, but Caligula turns toward the diabolical: he starts to kill off those who are close to him, whom he sees as a serious threat.
- Abilene is granted to King Agrippa I.

==== Anatolia ====
- Peter the Apostle founds the Church of Antioch (approximate date).
- April 9 – An earthquake destroys Antioch.
- The Pharisee Saul of Tarsus is converted to Christianity, after a vision (possible date). After the year 39, he is recognised as Saint Paul.

=== 38 AD ===
==== Roman Empire ====
- Claudius and Messalina are most likely married at this point in time.
- Apion heads a deputation to Emperor Caligula, to complain about the Jews in Alexandria.
- Phaedrus writes his popular collection of fables.

==== Egypt ====
- An anti-Jewish riot breaks out in Alexandria, during a visit by King Herod Agrippa I; the mob wants to place statues of Caligula in every synagogue.

==== Anatolia ====
- Andrew the Apostle becomes the first patriarch of Constantinople, and resigns that position shortly thereafter (traditional date).
- Stachys the Apostle becomes the second patriarch of Constantinople (traditional date).

==== China ====
- An epidemic breaks out in K'aui-chi, causing many deaths. Imperial official Ch'ung-li I provides medicines that save many lives.

=== 39 AD ===
==== Roman Empire ====
- Tigellinus, minister and favorite of the later Roman emperor Nero, is banished for adultery with Caligula's sisters.
- Gaius Caesar Augustus Germanicus (Caligula) and Gnaeus Domitius Corbulo become Roman consuls.
- Caligula orders a floating bridge to be built using ships as pontoons, stretching for two miles from Baiae to the neighboring port of Puteoli.
- Philo leads a Jewish delegation to Rome to protest the anti-Jewish conditions in Alexandria.

==== Germania ====
- Legio XV Primigenia and XXII Primigenia are levied by Caligula for the German frontier.
- Caligula's campaign into Germany is stopped by a conspiracy led by Cassius Chaerea. Even though he never even reaches Germany, Caligula proclaims himself victorious and orders a triumph.

==== Palestine ====
- Agrippa I, king of Judaea, successfully accuses Herod Antipas, tetrarch of Galilee and Perea, of conspiracy against Caligula. Antipas is exiled and Agrippa receives his territory.
- Caligula orders that a statue of himself be placed in the Temple in Jerusalem. The governor of Syria, Publius Petronius, who is responsible for having an erecting the statue, faces mass demonstrations by Jews of the region and manages to delay construction of the statue until the death of Caligula in AD 41.

==== Vietnam ====
- The Trung Sisters resist the Chinese influences in Vietnam.

== Significant people ==
- Guangwu, Emperor of China (25-57)
- Pharasmanes I, King of Caucasian Iberia (1-58)
- Feradach Finnfechtnach, Legendary High King of Ireland (14-36)
- Fíatach Finn, Legendary High King of Ireland (36-39)
- Fíachu Finnolach, Legendary High King of Ireland (39-56)
- Suinin, Legendary Emperor of Japan (29 BC–AD 70)
- Heraios, Yuezhi Tribal leader of the Kushans (c.1-30)
- Kujula Kadphises, King (and founder) of the Kushan Empire (30-80)
- Abgar V of Edessa, King of Osroene (4 BC–AD 7, 13–50)
- Artabanus III, King of the Parthian Empire (10-35, 36-40)
- Tiridates III, King of the Parthian Empire (35-36)
- Tiberius, Roman Emperor (AD 14–37)
- Gaius Caesar Germanicus/Caligula, Roman Emperor (AD 37–41)
- Claudius, statesman, Consul, and future Roman Emperor, in office (as Consul) 37
- Jesus Christ, founding figure of Christianity, (ca. 4 BC–ca. AD 33)
- Andrew the Apostle, Apostle and first Bishop of Byzantium (c.38)
- Mark the Evangelist, Apostle and first Coptic Pope of Alexandria (c.43-68)
- Paul the Apostle, Apostle and Theologian (c.5-64)
- Saint Peter, Apostle and first Bishop of Rome (c.30-c.64)
- Thomas the Apostle, Apostle and first Patriarch of the East (c.33-c.72)
- Yuri, King of Silla (24-57)

== Births ==
=== 30 AD ===
- November 8 – Nerva, Roman emperor (d. AD 98)
- Jia Kui, Chinese Confucian philosopher (d. AD 101)
- Mobon of Goguryeo, Korean king (d. AD 53)
- Poppaea Sabina, second wife of Nero (d. AD 65)
- Quintus Petillius Cerialis, Roman general

=== 31 AD ===
- Gnaeus Arrius Antoninus, Roman consul
- Musonius Rufus, Roman Stoic philosopher (d. 101)

=== 32 AD ===
- 28 April – Marcus Salvius Otho, Roman emperor (d. AD 69)
- Ban Chao, Chinese general and diplomat (d. 102)
- Ban Gu, Chinese historian and politician (d. AD 92)

=== 33 AD ===
- Gaius Rubellius Plautus, son of Gaius Rubellius Blandus and Julia Livia (d. AD 62)

=== 34 AD ===
- December 4 – Aulus Persius Flaccus, Roman poet (d. AD 62)
- Mariamne, daughter of Herod Agrippa I (approximate date)
- Zhang Daoling, Chinese Taoist master (d. 156)

=== 35 AD ===
- Decimus Valerius Asiaticus, Roman senator and governor
- Gaius Nymphidius Sabinus, Roman prefect (approximate date)
- Marcus Fabius Quintilianus, Roman rhetorician (approximate date)
- Quintus Junius Arulenus Rusticus, Roman senator (d. AD 93)
- Statilia Messalina, Roman empress and wife of Nero (approximate date)

=== 36 AD ===
- Lucius Annius Vinicianus, Roman senator and legatus in the Roman–Parthian War of 58–63.

=== 37 AD ===
- December 15 – Nero, Roman emperor (d. 68 AD)
- Josephus, Romano-Jewish historian (d. c. 100 AD)

=== 38 AD ===
- Drusilla, Jewish princess and daughter of Herod Agrippa I (d. AD 79)
- Drusilla, princess of Mauretania
- Julius Archelaus Antiochus, prince of Commagene (d. AD 92)
- Lucius Calpurnius Piso Licinianus, Roman co-emperor (d. AD 69)
- Marcus Valerius Martialis, Roman Latin poet (approximate date)

=== 39 AD ===
- November 3 – Marcus Annaeus Lucanus, Roman poet (d. AD 65)
- December 30 – Titus Flavius, Roman emperor (d. AD 81)
- Julia Drusilla, daughter of Caligula (d. AD 41)

== Deaths ==
=== 31 AD ===
- April 6 – Jesus of Nazareth (possible date of the crucifixion) (born circa 4 BC) The other possible dates also supported by scholarly consensus among a survey of 100 published scholarly biblical statements are April 7, AD 30 and April 3, AD 33, and April 27, AD 31 (according to a Chodesh calculating system).
- October 18 – Lucius Aelius Sejanus, Roman prefect and advisor (b. 20 BC)
- Claudia Livia Julia, niece and daughter-in-law of Tiberius (b. 13 BC)
- Marcus Velleius Paterculus, Roman historian and writer (b. c. 19 BC)
- Nero Julius Caesar Germanicus, grandson and heir of Tiberius (b. AD 6)

=== 32 AD ===
- Cassius Severus, Roman rhetor and writer
- Decimus Haterius Agrippa, Roman consul
- Lucius Calpurnius Piso, Roman consul (b. 48 BC)
- John the Baptist, religious figure in Christianity, Islam, and other Abrahamic religions

=== 33 AD ===
- Jesus of Nazareth (possible date of the crucifixion) The other possible dates supported by a number of scholars are April 7, AD 30 and April 6, AD 31.
- Agrippina the Elder, daughter of Marcus Vipsanius Agrippa, wife of Germanicus (suicide by starvation; b. 14 BC)
- Drusus Caesar, son of Germanicus and Agrippina the Elder, adoptive son of Tiberius (starvation; b. AD 8)
- Gaius Asinius Gallus, widower of Vipsania Agrippina and alleged lover of Agrippina the elder (starvation)
- Lucius Aelius Larnia, Roman consul, governor and praefectus urbi in Rome (b. 45 BC)
- Marcus Aemilius Lepidus, Roman consul and father-in-law of Drusus Caesar (natural causes; b. 30 BC)
- Marcus Cocceius Nerva, Roman jurist (suicide by starvation; b. 5 BC)
- Munatia Plancina, wife of Gnaeus Calpurnius Piso (suicide)

=== 34 AD ===
- Artaxias III, Roman client king of Armenia (b. 13 BC)
- Philip the Tetrarch, Jewish ruler of Batanaea
- Stephen, Jewish martyr of Christianity (stoned to death)

=== 35 AD ===
- Arsaces I (or Arshak I), Roman client king of Armenia
- Epaticcus, British prince of the Catuvellauni (approximate date)
- Gaius Poppaeus Sabinus, Roman statesman and consul
- Lucius Fulcinius Trio, Roman senator and suffect consul
- Phraates, Parthian prince and son of Phraates IV

=== 36 AD ===
- December 24 – Gongsun Shu, Chinese emperor of Chengjia
- Gaius Sulpicius Galba, Roman senator and consul
- Thrasyllus of Mendes, Greek grammarian and astronomer
- Vibulenus Agrippa, Roman nobleman and knight (eques)

=== 37 AD ===
- March 16 – Tiberius, Roman emperor (b. 42 BC)
- May 1 – Antonia the Younger, daughter of Mark Antony and Octavia the Younger (b. 36 BC)
- Lucius Arruntius (the Younger), Roman politician
- Marcus Junius Silanus, Roman politician (b. c. 26 BC)
- Maroboduus, king of the Marcomanni (b. c. 30 BC)

=== 38 AD ===
- June 10 – Julia Drusilla, sister of Caligula (b. AD 16)
- Archelaus of Cilicia, Roman client king
- Du Shi, Chinese inventor and politician
- Ennia Thrasylla, Roman noblewoman
- Naevius Sutorius Macro, Roman prefect (b. 21 BC)
- Rhoemetalces II, Roman client king
- Tiberius Gemellus, grandson of Tiberius (b. AD 19)
- Tiberius Julius Aspurgus, Roman client king

=== 39 AD ===
- Gnaeus Cornelius Lentulus Gaetulicus, Roman consul
- Marcus Aemilius Lepidus, Roman politician (b. AD 6)
- Seneca the Elder, Roman rhetorician (approximate date)
