= AD 65 =

AD 65 in various calendars
- Gregorian calendar: AD 65; LXV
- Ab urbe condita: 818
- Assyrian calendar: 4815
- Balinese saka calendar: N/A
- Bengali calendar: −529 – −528
- Berber calendar: 1015
- Buddhist calendar: 609
- Burmese calendar: −573
- Byzantine calendar: 5573–5574
- Chinese calendar: 甲子年 (Wood Rat); 2762 or 2555 — to — 乙丑年 (Wood Ox); 2763 or 2556
- Coptic calendar: −219 – −218
- Discordian calendar: 1231
- Ethiopian calendar: 57–58
- Hebrew calendar: 3825–3826
- Hindu calendars
- Vikram Samvat: 121–122
- Shaka Samvat: N/A
- Kali Yuga: 3165–3166
- Holocene calendar: 10065
- Iranian calendar: 557 BP – 556 BP
- Islamic calendar: 574 BH – 573 BH
- Javanese calendar: N/A
- Julian calendar: AD 65; LXV
- Korean calendar: 2398
- Minguo calendar: 1847 before ROC 民前1847年
- Nanakshahi calendar: −1403
- Seleucid era: 376/377 AG
- Thai solar calendar: 607–608
- Tibetan calendar: ཤིང་ཕོ་བྱི་བ་ལོ་ (male Wood-Rat); 191 or −190 or −962 — to — ཤིང་མོ་གླང་ལོ་ (female Wood-Ox); 192 or −189 or −961

AD 65 (LXV) was a common year starting on Tuesday of the Julian calendar. At the time, it was known as the Year of the Consulship of Nerva and Vestinus (or, less frequently, year 818 Ab urbe condita). The denomination AD 65 for this year has been used since the early medieval period, when the Anno Domini calendar era became the prevalent method in Europe for naming years.

== Events ==
=== By place ===
==== Roman Empire ====
- April 19 – The freedman Milichus betrays the Pisonian conspiracy led by Gaius Calpurnius Piso to kill Emperor Nero and all the conspirators are arrested.
- An epidemic afflicts Rome.
- After a stage performance in which he appears and shocks the senatorial class considerably, Nero engages in a series of reprisals against Seneca the Younger and Tigellinus, pro-republican senators, and anyone else he distrusts.
- Nero's pregnant wife, Poppea Sabina, dies from Nero kicking her stomach or while having a miscarriage.

=== By topic ===
==== Religion ====
- Paul of Tarsus ordains Timothy as bishop of Ephesus (traditional date).
- Paul writes his first epistle to Timothy in Corinth; afterwards, he goes to Nikopoli to spend the winter.
- In China, the first official reference to Buddhism is made.
- The first Christian community in Africa is founded by Mark, a disciple of Peter.

== Births ==
- Philopappos, Greek prince of Commagene (d. AD 116)
- Tiberius Claudius Atticus Herodes, Greek aristocrat

== Deaths ==
- April 30 – Lucan, Roman poet and philosopher (b. AD 39)
- Faenius Rufus, Roman praetorian prefect (executed)
- Gaius Calpurnius Piso, Roman consul (approximate date)
- Gaius Julius Alpinus Classicianus, Roman procurator
- Jude the Apostle, Christian martyr (approximate date)
- Lucius Antistius Vetus, Roman consul and governor
- Lucius Junius Gallio Annaeanus, Roman politician
- Marcus Julius Vestinus Atticus, Roman politician
- Marcus Ostorius Scapula, Roman politician
- Plautius Lateranus, Roman politician (executed)
- Poppea Sabina, second wife of Nero (b. AD 30)
- Seneca, Roman statesman and tutor of Nero (b. AD 1)
- Simon the Zealot, Christian martyr (approximate date)
