= Daquin =

Daquin is a surname. Notable people with the surname include:

- Dominique Daquin (born 1972), French volleyball player
- Frédéric Daquin (born 1978), French footballer
- Louis Daquin (1908–1980), French film director and actor
- Louis-Claude Daquin (1694–1772), French classical composer
