= Vibullius Agrippa =

Vibullius Agrippa (also sometimes called Vibulenus Agrippa) was an ancient Roman man of the first century who was accused of a crime and killed himself in front of the Roman senate.

== Name ==
Agrippa is called "Vibulenus" by Tacitus and "Vibullius" Cassius Dio. Modern historians, such as Ronald Syme, tend to favour "Vibullius" based on inscriptional evidence. "Vibulenus" may have been a praenomen.

== Trial ==
Agrippa was accused of some crime, probably treason, before the senate in the final years of the reign of Tiberius, in 33 AD according to Dio and 36 AD according to Tacitus. His case is often mentioned to highlight the frequency with which ordinary citizens were being executed in that time, and for the novelty of the case's outcome: Agrippa faced his accusers in the senate and swallowed poison that he had brought with him in a ring. Undeterred, the lictors rushed his body to the prison (the tullianum) and hanged or strangled him anyway, but he was already dead. Unlike an execution, this sort of pre-emptive suicide prevented, at least in theory, the state or his accusers from claiming a share of his property, and allowed the suicide to be buried, provided they died before being convicted. Tacitus does not record whether Agrippa's mock execution in the tullianum was sufficient to satisfy the letter of the law and allow confiscation of his property.

== Family ==
Vibullia Alcia Agrippina may have been his descendant or other type of relative.
