= AD 96 =

AD 96 in various calendars
- Gregorian calendar: AD 96; XCVI
- Ab urbe condita: 849
- Assyrian calendar: 4846
- Balinese saka calendar: 17–18
- Bengali calendar: −498 – −497
- Berber calendar: 1046
- Buddhist calendar: 640
- Burmese calendar: −542
- Byzantine calendar: 5604–5605
- Chinese calendar: 乙未年 (Wood Goat); 2793 or 2586 — to — 丙申年 (Fire Monkey); 2794 or 2587
- Coptic calendar: −188 – −187
- Discordian calendar: 1262
- Ethiopian calendar: 88–89
- Hebrew calendar: 3856–3857
- Hindu calendars
- Vikram Samvat: 152–153
- Shaka Samvat: 17–18
- Kali Yuga: 3196–3197
- Holocene calendar: 10096
- Iranian calendar: 526 BP – 525 BP
- Islamic calendar: 542 BH – 541 BH
- Javanese calendar: N/A
- Julian calendar: AD 96; XCVI
- Korean calendar: 2429
- Minguo calendar: 1816 before ROC 民前1816年
- Nanakshahi calendar: −1372
- Seleucid era: 407/408 AG
- Thai solar calendar: 638–639
- Tibetan calendar: ཤིང་མོ་ལུག་ལོ་ (female Wood-Sheep); 222 or −159 or −931 — to — མེ་ཕོ་སྤྲེ་ལོ་ (male Fire-Monkey); 223 or −158 or −930

AD 96 (XCVI) was a leap year starting on Friday of the Julian calendar. At the time, it was known as the Year of the Consulship of Valens and Vetus (or, less frequently, year 849 Ab urbe condita). The denomination AD 96 for this year has been used since the early medieval period, when the Anno Domini calendar era became the prevalent method in Europe for naming years.

== Events ==
=== By place ===
==== Roman Empire ====
- September 18 – Emperor Domitian is stabbed to death by a freedman at the age 44 after a 15-year reign, in a palace conspiracy involving officers of the Praetorian Guard. The Flavian dynasty ends.
- Nerva is declared emperor by the Roman Senate as the new ruler of the Roman Empire. He recalls citizens exiled by Domitian; this is the beginning of the Era of the Five Good Emperors. The Antonines Dynasty starts.
- Marcus Ulpius Traianus becomes governor of Upper Germany.
- The Arch of Titus is completed in Rome.

=== By topic ===
==== Art and Science ====
- End of the period covered by Tacitus in his Histories.

==== Religion ====
- The Book of Revelation is written (approximate date).
- A schism in Buddhism creates a new, popular religion in India, Mahâyâna ("Great Vehicle").

== Births ==
- Lucius Minicius Natalis Quadronius Verus, Roman statesman

== Deaths ==
- September 18 – Domitian, Roman emperor (b. AD 51)
- Gaius Manlius Valens, Roman senator and consul (b. AD 6)
- Publius Papinius Statius, Roman poet (approximate date)
