= Financial crisis of 33 =

Financial and economic crisis in the Roman Empire

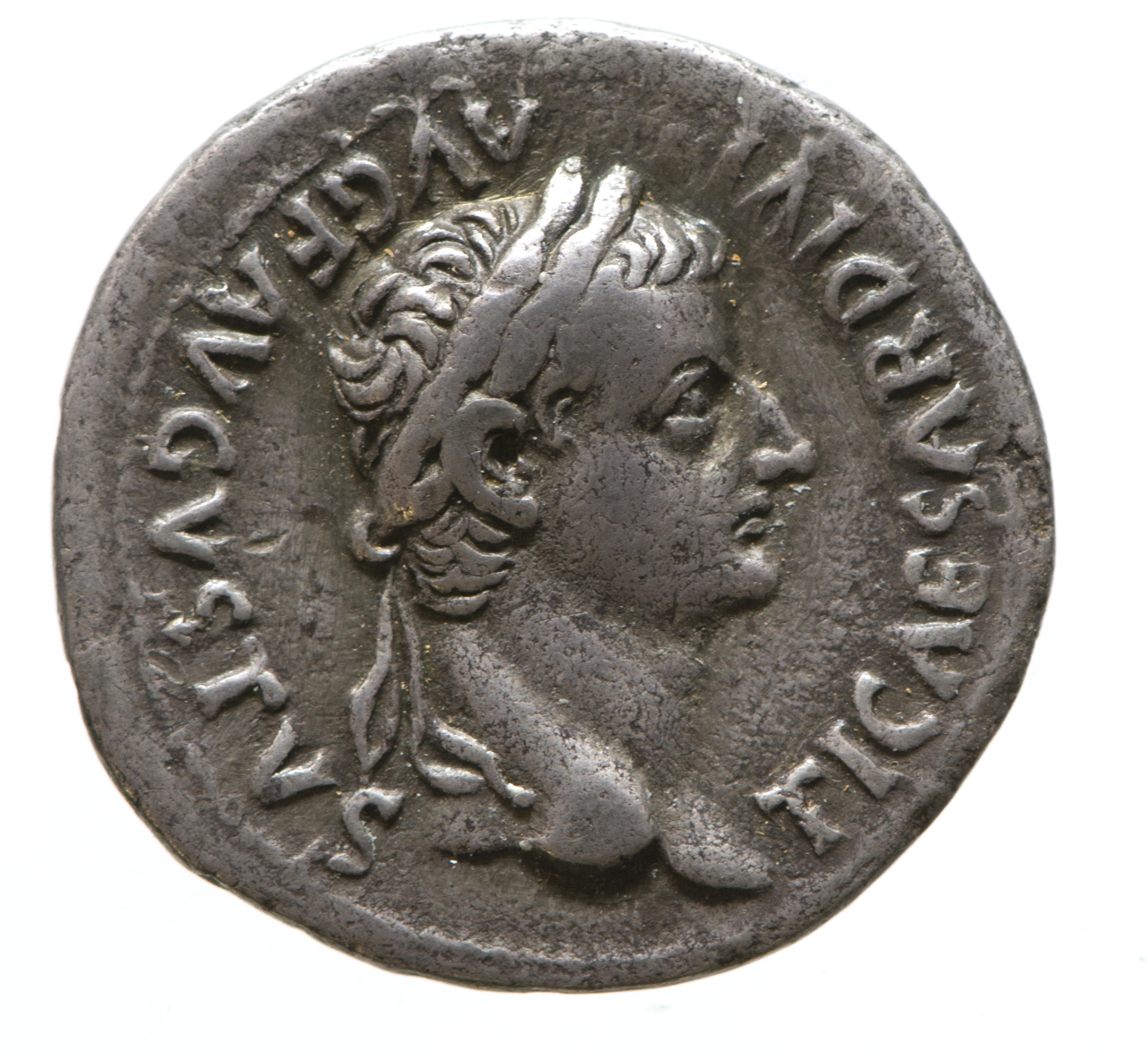
A silver coin of Tiberius.

A financial and economic crisis occurred in 33 AD in the Roman Empire, during the reign of Emperor Tiberius. After a shift in government policy and a series of confiscations reduced the Roman money supply, the crisis was triggered by the invocation of an old law which resulted in the early recalls of loans given, a credit crunch, and a crash of real estate prices. The crisis was eventually resolved with a liquidity injection in the form of interest-free loans.

== Historical background ==
According to Tacitus's Annals, Julius Caesar had passed a law in 49 BC which regulated usury, requiring lenders to possess a certain quantity of farmland in Italy. The law had been passed as a wartime measure to prevent capital flight from Italy, but it had been largely ignored. During the early reign of Augustus, the Roman government significantly expanded the money supply through cash handouts, extensive public works projects, and acquisition of Italian agricultural land for veterans to settle (these being partly funded by Egypt's treasury). As a result, interest rates fell significantly, from around 12 to 4 percent per annum.

However, later in his reign, public investment declined, and his successor Tiberius exacerbated the reduction through his frugal spending. The Roman government ran a significant budget surplus throughout Tiberius's reign and accumulated large fiscal reserves. Despite the stagnating money supply, gold and silver coins flowed out from the Roman Empire to pay for imports of luxury goods, especially from India. Following the arrest and execution of Sejanus in 31 AD, his followers were prosecuted and their assets seized for the benefit of the Roman state. Additionally, several major business houses had become bankrupt due to external events and a bank run had occurred when a banking house failed with other banks refusing to bail it out. These events resulted in a general decline in prices of real estate and agricultural land, prompting the Roman government to intervene.

== Crisis ==
In 33 AD, Roman courts began to enforce Caesar's law and prosecute a number of citizens who were in violation. When the matter was brought to the Roman Senate and to Emperor Tiberius, it was decided that an eighteen month grace period would be granted for lenders to adjust their holdings to follow the legal requirement. Tacitus wrote, likely in exaggeration, that all senators were in violation of the law. This order resulted in a rapid contraction of the money supply due to a large number of loans being called early by the lenders. In an attempt to alleviate the crisis, moneylenders were ordered to purchase an increased proportion of Italian agricultural land in a recreation of Caesar's law, but this only exacerbated the crisis as the sudden demand for cash resulted in more loans being called and fire sales of real estate to meet those loans. A number of banks in Rome and across the empire began to fail, with the ensuing credit crunch significantly driving up interest rates. With prices rapidly declining, those holding cash also opted to delay purchases in hopes of securing even lower prices. Economic historians M.K. Thornton and R.L. Thornton theorised that, due to the relatively long gap between the cessation of significant public spending and the crisis, many slaveowners expended their cash reserves in maintaining the underemployed slaves' basic needs, further worsening the crisis.

The crisis was resolved following a government intervention, with Tiberius appointing a commission of five senators who could provide interest-free loans to landowners in financial distress for a period of three years. A sum of 100 million sesterces was allocated for this program and the loans were secured with agricultural land twice the loan's amount. Tiberius's successor, Caligula, resumed the extensive state expenditures through public works projects after he took power in 37 AD.

== Scholarship ==
The financial crisis was recorded by several Roman authors, including Tacitus, Suetonius, and Cassius Dio. Their accounts of the crisis were relatively brief, with Tacitus's account being the most detailed of the three. Thornton and Thornton pointed out how most Roman-era writers were uninterested in economics yet their accounts of the crisis were quite sophisticated, and concluded that the crisis must have had a significant impression at the time. Modern scholarship of the crisis is based on the accounts of the Roman authors, with Tenney Frank's 1935 article in the American Journal of Philology being the generally accepted modern summary. Frank's 1935 article on the crisis was written in the midst of the Great Depression, when Keynesian economics was a new concept and the general consensus blamed a monetary contraction for the malaise. Later modern scholars developed further theories on the causes of the crisis; historian Michael Crawford, for example, focused more on currency outflows due to trade deficits instead of reduced state expenditures under Tiberius.

The crisis has been compared to the 2008 financial crisis, authors drawing parallels on the real estate aspect of the crisis and the subsequent government intervention. Historian Colin P. Elliott pointed out that interest in the 33 AD crisis increased in the aftermath of multiple modern crises, including the Great Depression, the 1973 oil crisis, the 1987 Black Monday, and the 2008 financial crisis.
