= Manius Acilius Glabrio (consul 91) =

1st century Roman senator and consul

Manius Acilius Glabrio was a Roman senator who served as consul ordinarius in AD 91 as the colleague of Trajan, afterwards emperor. Although one of many senators executed during the reign of Domitian on the alleged grounds of plotting against the emperor, he was remembered by his contemporaries best for his strength. Domitian summoned Glabrio during the latter's consulate to his Alban estate during the festival of the Juvenalia to kill a large lion; not only did Glabrio despatch the beast, but he escaped all injury. Following his defeat of the lion, Glabrio was banished by Domitian, then executed while in exile.

== Family ==
Glabrio belonged to the gens Acilia, a plebeian family that first came to notice in the Third century BC, and could claim a number of consuls as ancestors, beginning with Manius Acilius Glabrio in 191 BC. Glabrio's own father, whose existence is alluded to by Juvenal as an old man still alive at his son's death, is inferred to have been a suffect consul during the reign of Nero.

His wife has been identified as Arria L.f. Plaria Vera Priscilla, known from a surviving inscription CIL VI, 6333. They had one known son, Manius Acilius Glabrio, consul ordinarius in 124.

== Possible Christianity ==
According to Suetonius, Domitian ordered several senators and ex-consuls, including Glabrio, to be executed quasi molitores rerum novarum, "as contrivers of new things". Eusebius alludes to this proscription of "well-born and notable men", but does not mention why Domitian had done this, nor provides any names. John Xiphilinus, speaking of the executions of AD 95, says that some members of the imperial family and other persons of importance were condemned for impiety. Some writers afterwards interpreted the charge of impiety against Acilius Glabrio as evidence that he belonged to the Christian religion, although others believe it more likely he might have converted to Judaism or just not have been loyal enough to emperor Domitian.

The legend that Glabrio was an early convert to Christianity was suggested to be true when in 1888 a tomb of the Acilii Glabriones was discovered adjacent to the Catacomb of Priscilla. Although the inscriptions from the tomb mentioning the family were inscribed in a script used generations later than this Manius Acilius Glabrio and his wife Priscilla, at the time numerous experts eagerly cited this archaeological find as certain proof of the story. It was in 1931 when P. Styger was able to show the stone inscriptions did not properly belong to the chamber, but had been part of a sepulchre that was demolished in the construction of the Basilica of San Silvester after the fourth century. Half a century later, F. Tolotti was able to confirm Styger's interpretation when he identified the funerary area the inscriptions had come from.

== See also ==
- Catacomb of Priscilla

Political offices
Preceded by Marcus Tullius Cerialis; Gnaeus Pompeius Catullinus as suffecti	Roman consul 91 with Trajan	Succeeded by Gnaeus Minicius Faustinus; Publius Valerius Marinus as suffecti
