= Governors of Azerbaijan (Iran) =

There is an incomplete list of governors of Azerbaijan, a region in northwestern Iran.

== Kings of Media Atropatene ==
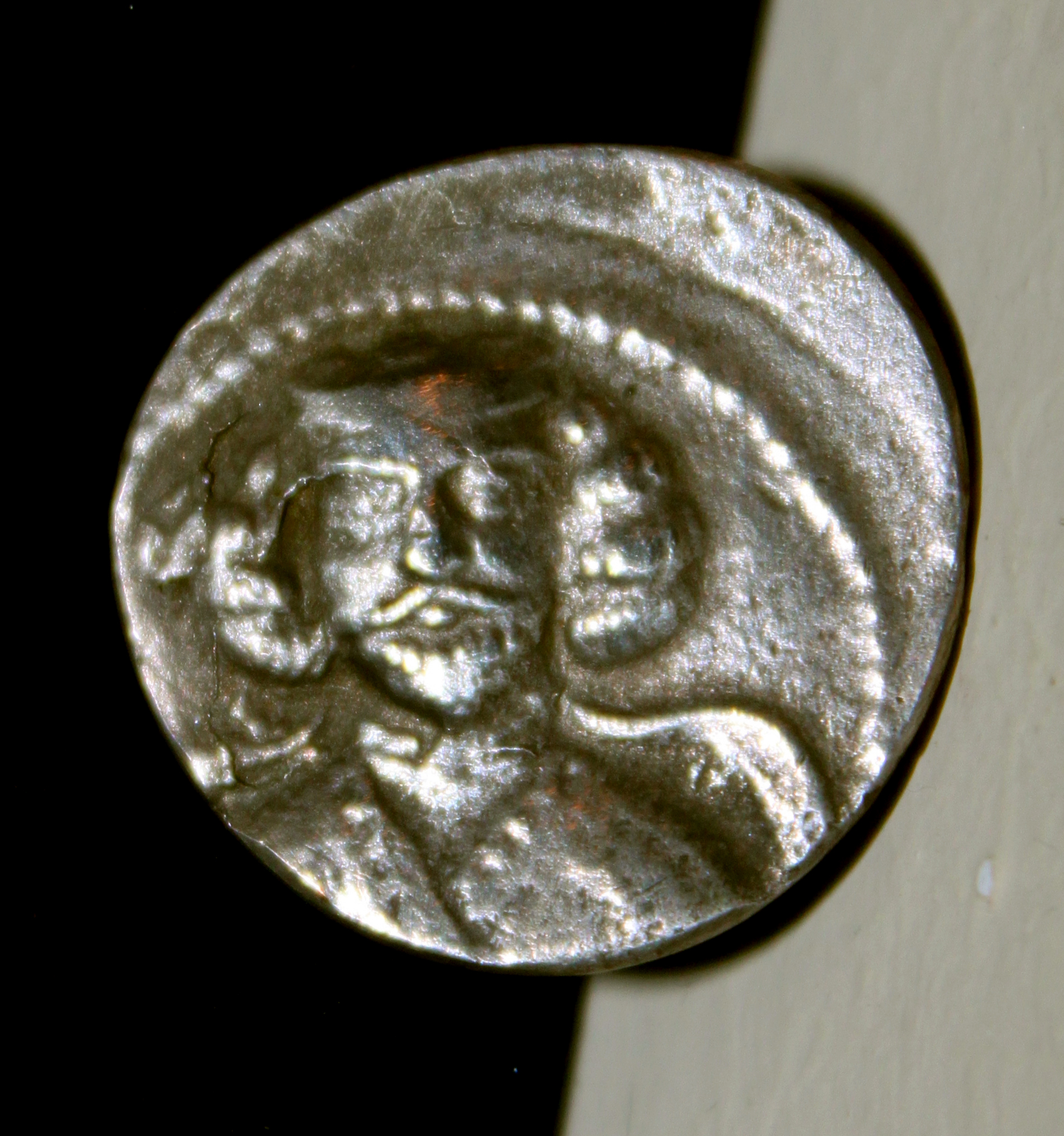
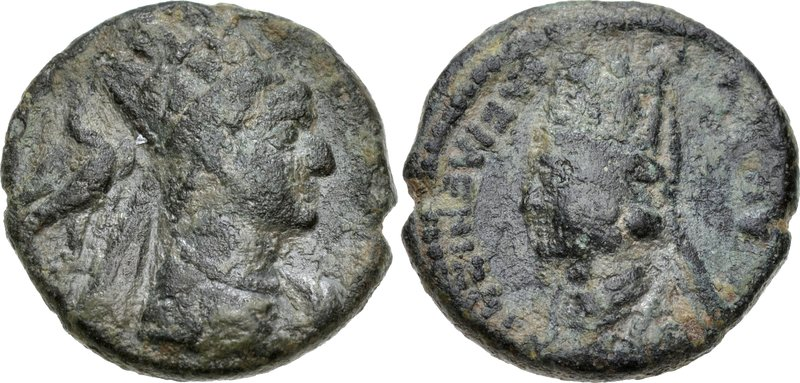
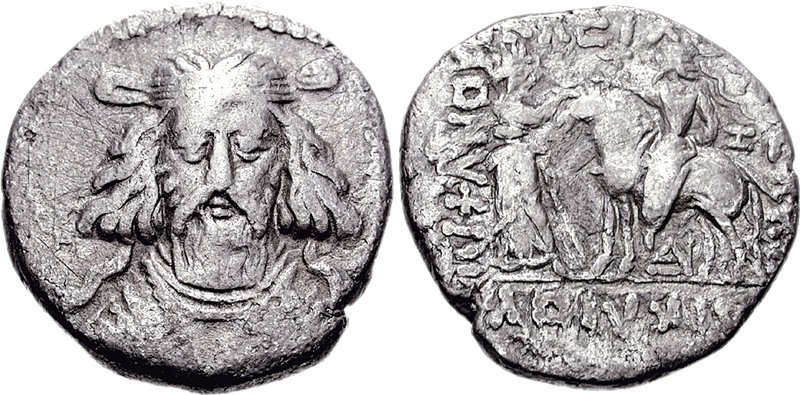
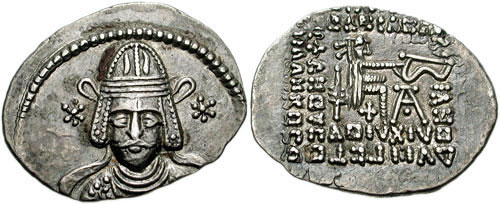
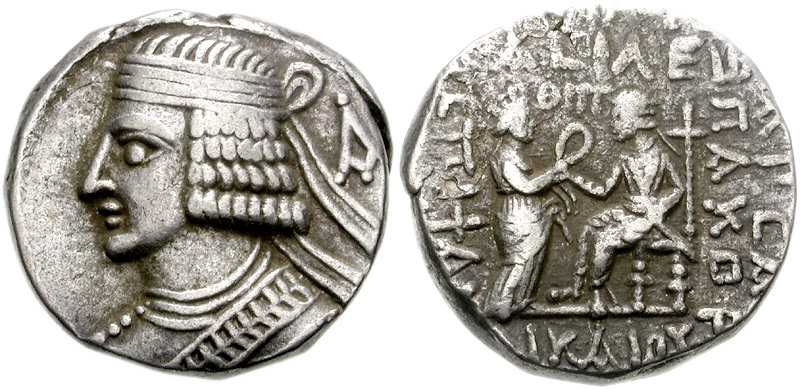
Coins of Darius I of Media Atropatene, Artavasdes I of Media Atropatene, Artabanus III of Parthia, Vonones II and Pacorus II
- Atropates from 320s BC til an unknown date
- Artabazanes (flourished 3rd century BC) ruled in 221 BC or 220 BC, a contemporary of the Seleucid Greek King Antiochus III the Great. He is said to be a paternal grandson of the Persian King Darius II from his marriage to the daughter of Gobryas
- Mithridates (100 BC – 66 BC), ruled from 67 BC to c. 66 BC who was father-in-law of the Armenian King Tigranes the Great
- Darius I (c. 85 BC – c. 65 BC), ruled c. 65 BC
- Ariobarzanes I (c. 85 BC – 56 BC), ruled from 65 BC to 56 BC
- Artavasdes I (65 BC – 20 BC), ruled from 56 BC until 31 BC. Son of the above named Ariobarzanes and a son-in-law of King Antiochus I Theos of Commagene
- Asinnalus (flourished 1st century BC), ruled from 30 BC to an unknown date in the 20s BC
- Ariobarzanes II (40 BC – 4), ruled sometime from 28 BC to 20 BC until 4 AD and served as King of Armenia from 2 BC to 4
- Artavasdes IV (20 BC – 6), King of Media Atropatene and Armenia from 4 AD to 6 AD
- Artabanus III of Parthia (flourished second half of 1st century BC – 38 AD), grandson of Artavasdes I, ruled from 6 until 10
- Vonones II (flourished second half of 1st century BC – 51 AD), brother of Artabanus and ruled from 11? until 51
- Pacorus II (flourished 1st century & first half of 2nd century), son of the above named and ruled from 51 AD until 78 AD

== Early Islamic rulers ==
- Al-Ash'ath ibn Qays, governor of Adharbayjan
- Maslama ibn Abd al-Malik, governor of Adharbayjan (731–733)
- Sa'id ibn Amr al-Harashi, governor of Adharbayjan (733–735)
- Yahya ibn Khalid, governor of Adharbayjan (765–?)
- Khaydhar ibn Kawus al-Afshin, governor of Adharbayjan (835–?)
- Mankjur al-Farghani (837–?)

== Sajid dynasty ==
- Muhammad ibn Abi'l-Saj, Afshin of Azerbaijan (889–901)
- Devdad ibn Muhammad, Emir of Azerbaijan (901)
- Yusuf ibn Abi'l-Saj, Emir of Azerbaijan (901–928)
- Subuk, Emir of Azerbaijan (919–922)
- Abu'l-Musafir al-Fath, Emir of Azerbaijan (928–929)

== 10th century governors ==
- Wasif al-Shirvani
- Muflih al-Saji (c. 929–935)
- Daysam ibn Ibrahim al-Kurdi (ca. 937/8–942)
- Abu Mansur Muhammad

== Sallarid dynasty ==
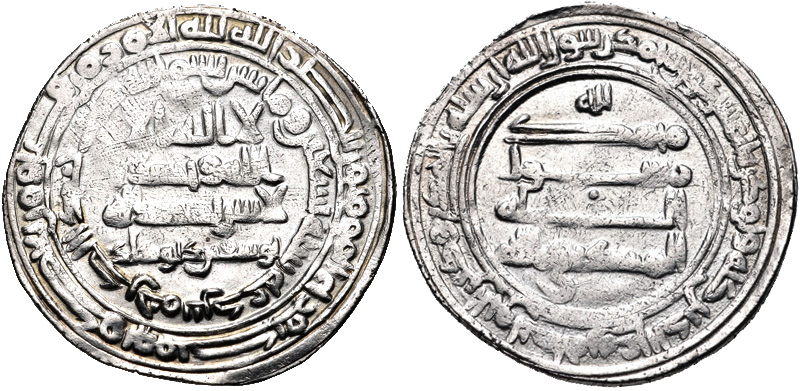
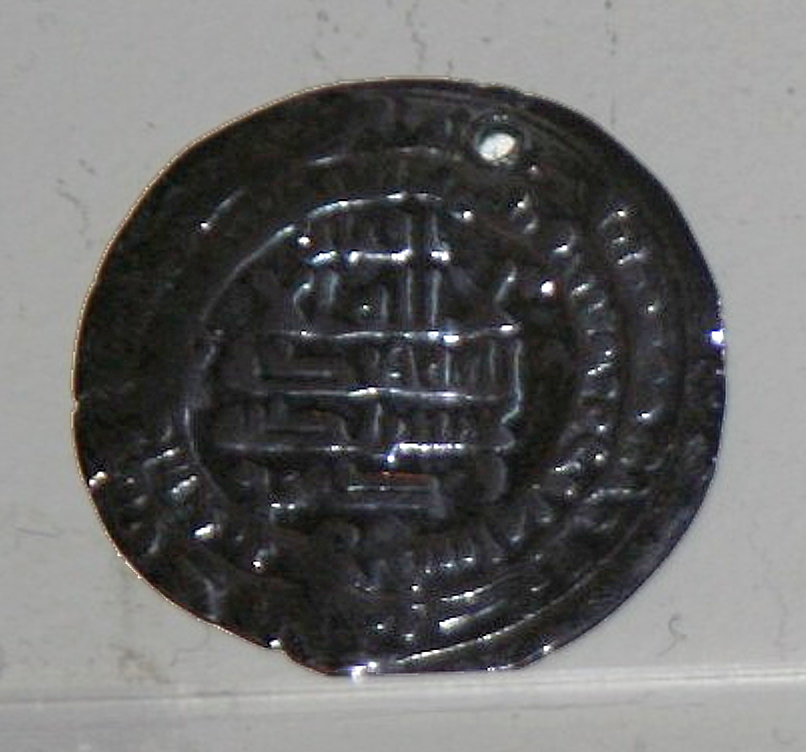
Coins of Arabic rulers Yusuf ibn Abi'l-Saj and Marzuban ibn Muhammad
- Muhammad ibn Musafir, ruler of Azerbaijan (919–941)
- Marzuban ibn Muhammad, ruler of Azerbaijan (941/2–949)
- Muhammad ibn Musafir, ruler of Azerbaijan (949–953)
- Marzuban ibn Muhammad, ruler of Azerbaijan (949–957)
- Justan I ibn Marzuban I, ruler of Azerbaijan (957–960)
- Ismail ibn Wahsudan, ruler of Azerbaijan (960–?)
- Ibrahim I ibn Marzuban I, ruler of Azerbaijan (957–979)
- Nuh ibn Wahsudan, ruler of Azerbaijan
- Marzuban II ibn Ismail, ruler of Azerbaijan

== Golden Horde governor of Azerbaijan (claimant) ==
- Chormaqan (1230–1241)
- Baiju Noyan (1241–1260)
- Shiramun (1260–?)

== Timurid governors of Azerbaijan ==
- Miran Shah

== Safavid governors of Azerbaijan ==
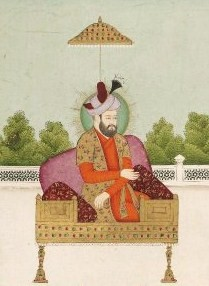
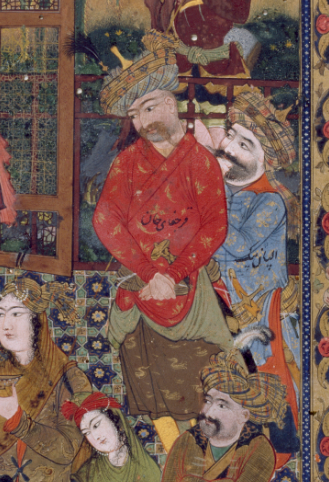
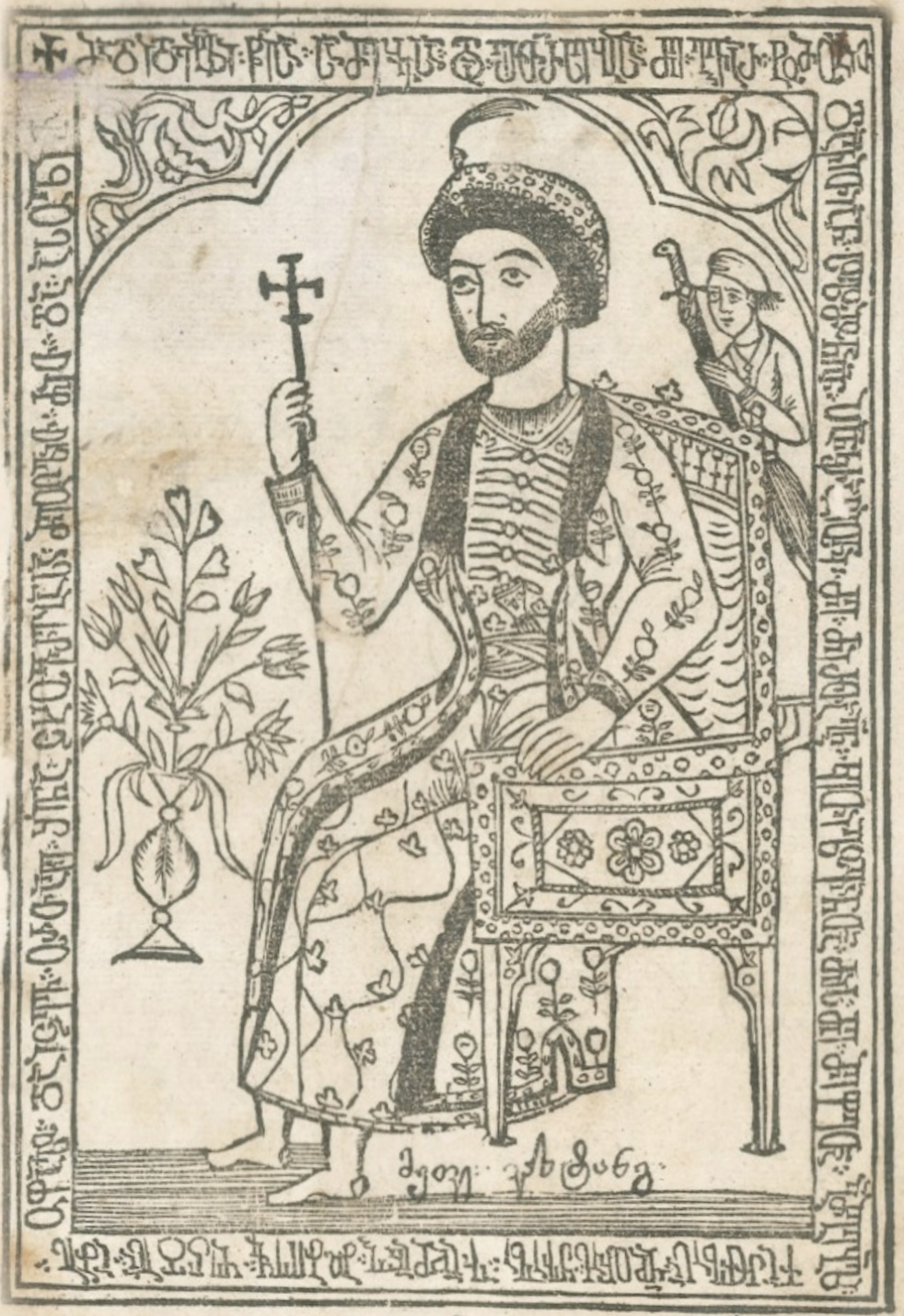
Persian governors of Azerbaijan: Miran Shah, Qarachaqay Khan and Vakhtang VI of Kartli
- Haqqverdi Sultan (?–1593)
- Farhad Khan Qaramanlu (1593)
- Zu'l Fiqar Qaramanlu
- Shahbandeh Beg Torkman (1st term)
- Qarachaqay Khan (1618–1620)
- Shahbandeh Beg Torkman (2nd term)
- Rostam Khan (1632–1633)
- Bijan Beg
- Aliqoli Khan
- Vakhtang VI
- Bakar of Kartli
- Safiqoli Khan Ziyadoghlu Qajar (aka Aliqoli Khan)
- Mohammad-Ali Khan of Tabriz (1719–1720)
- Mikhri (Mehdi?) Khan

== Qajar governors of Azerbaijan ==
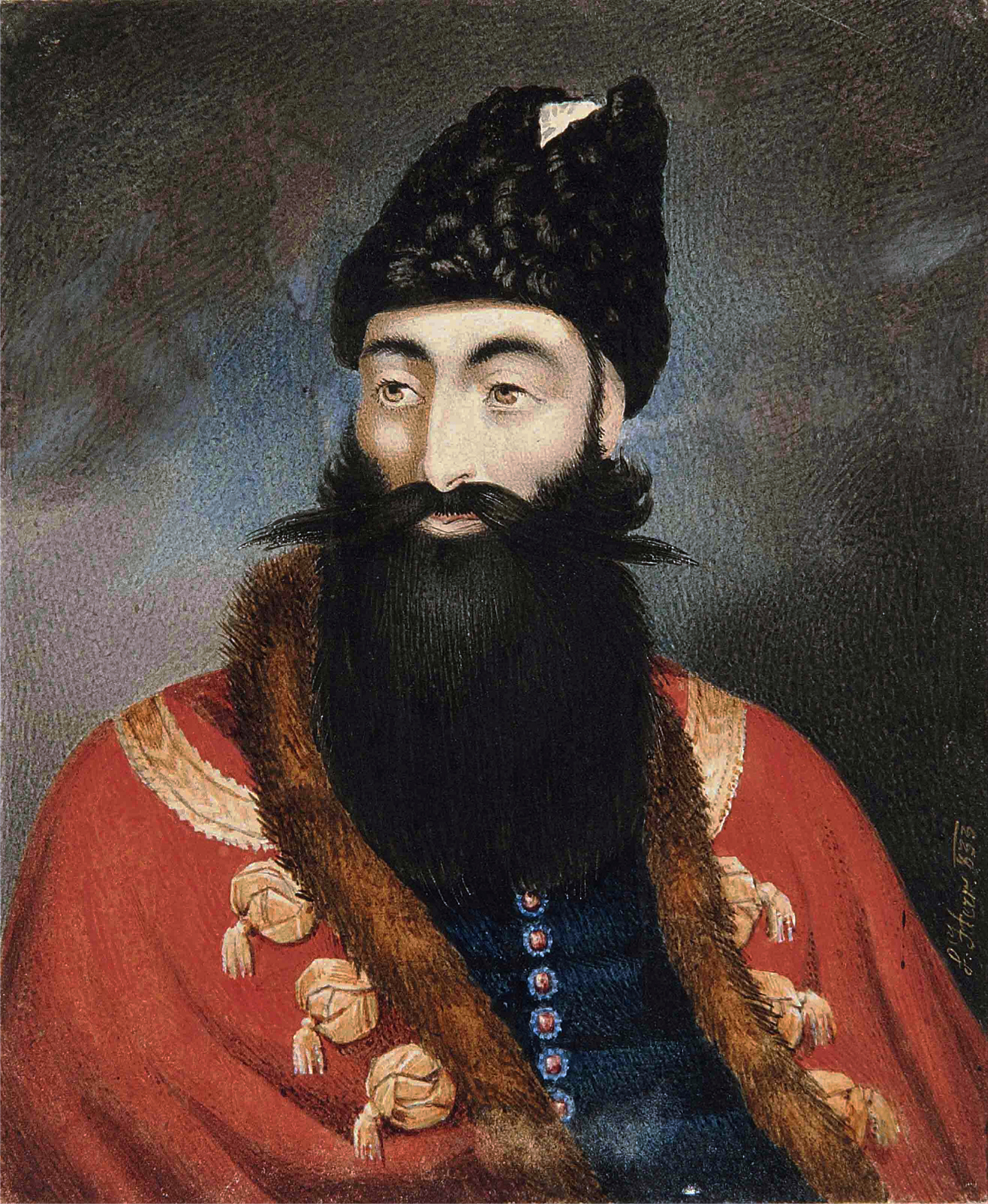
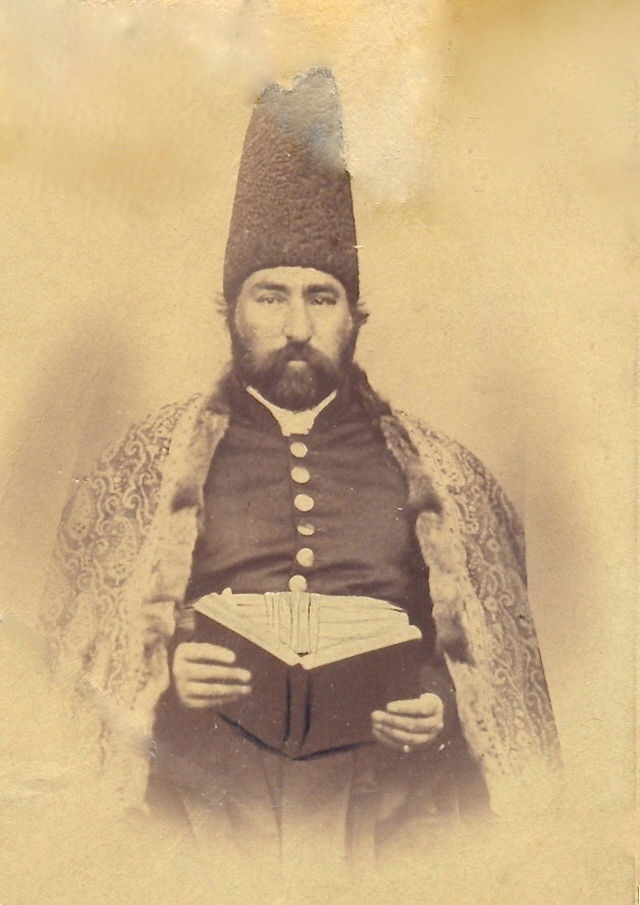
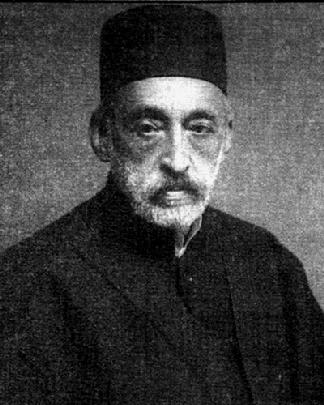
Qajar governors of Azerbaijan: Abbas Mirza, Bahman Mirza Qajar and Mehdi Qoli Hedayat
- Abbas Mirza (1798–?)
- Jahangir Mirza Qajar
- Fereydun Mirza (1831–?)
- Firuz Mirza (1837–1850)
- Bahman Mirza (1841–?)
- Mehdi Qoli Hedayat (1908–1911)

== Pahlavi governors of Azerbaijan ==
- Mozaffar Alam (1950–?)
- Mohsen Rais (1958–1960)
