= Artavasdes =

Artavasdes is the Hellenized form of the Iranian name *R̥tavazdāʰ. Variant renderings in Greek include Artabazos (Ἀρτάβαζος), Artabazes (Ἀρταβάζης), and Artabasdos (Ἀρτάβασδος); in Armenian Artavazd (Արտավազդ); and in Latin Ardabastus or Artabasdus. Artavasdes' name is the Latin attestation of an Old Iranian name *Ṛtavazdah-, identical to the Avestan Ašavazdah, presumably meaning "powerful/persevering through truth".

People with this name include:

== Persian satraps ==
- Artabazos I of Phrygia (flourished 5th century BC)
- Artabazos II of Phrygia (flourished 4th century BC)

== Kings and emperors ==
=== Media Atropatene ===
- Artabazanes (flourished 3rd century BC), King of Media Atropatene
- Artavasdes I (flourished 1st century BC), King of Media Atropatene and Sophene
- Artavasdes II, King of Media Atropatene and Armenia from AD 4 to 6, also known as Artavasdes IV of Armenia

=== Armenia ===
- Artavasdes I (died 115 BC), King of Armenia
- Artavasdes II (died 31 BC), King of Armenia 53 BC to 34 BC
- Artavasdes III, King of Armenia 5 BC to 2 BC
- Artavasdes IV, King of Armenia and Media Atropatene from AD 4 to 6, also known as Artavasdes II of Media Atropatene
- Artavasdes V, King of Armenia from 252 until 287

=== Characene ===
- Artabazos of Characene, a King who flourished late 40s BC

=== Byzantine empire ===
- Artabasdos (died 743), Byzantine Emperor of Constantinople who died in 743

== Others ==
- Artabazes (military officer) (died 542), Byzantine soldier
- Artavasdes I Mamikonian, an Armenian sparapet
- Ardabast (Ardabastus), probably legendary son of Wittiza, Visigothic king
- Ardabast (Ardebart), Father of Erwig, Visigothic king
