= Bizzarri =

Bizzarri is an Italian surname. Notable people with the surname include:

- Albano Bizzarri (born 1977), Argentine footballer
- Angela Bizzarri (born 1988), American distance runner
- Marco Bizzarri (born 1962), Italian businessman, President and CEO of Gucci
- Pietro Bizzarri (1525–1586), Italian historian and spy

== See also ==
- Bizzarrini, Italian automotive manufacturer
