= Damo =

Damo can refer to:

== People ==
- Demo (poet) (fl. c. AD 200), ancient Greek poet whose name is also spelt Damo
- Damo (philosopher) (fl. c. 500 BC), daughter of Pythagoras and Theano
- Bodhidharma, 5th or 6th century Indian founder of Zen Buddhism, known as Damo (達摩) in China
- Damo Suzuki, Japanese musician and singer Kenji Suzuki (1950–2024)
- Big Damo (born 1985), a ring name of Northern Irish professional wrestler Killian Dain
- Damo (Korea), a class of servants in Korea

== Entertainment ==
- Damo (TV series), a 2003 Korean TV drama miniseries
- Damo Johnson, a fictional character on the New Zealand soap opera Shortland Street
- Damo Whelan, half of Damo and Ivor, an Irish comedy fictional duo, both played by the same person

== Other uses ==
- Damo, Somalia, a coastal settlement
- DAMO Academy, research division of Alibaba Group

== See also ==
- Paulo Vitor Damo da Rosa (born 1987), Brazilian Magic: The Gathering player
