= Julia Balbilla =

1st/2nd century Roman noble woman and poet

- Princess of Commagene
- Born: AD 72; Rome, Roman Empire
- Died: after AD 130
Names
- Julia Balbilla
- House: Orontid
- Father: Gaius Julius Archelaus Antiochus Epiphanes
- Mother: Claudia Capitolina

Julia Balbilla (Greek: Ἰουλία Βαλβίλλα, AD 72 – after AD 130) was a Roman noble woman and poet. Whilst in Thebes, touring Egypt as part of the imperial court of Hadrian, she inscribed three epigrams which have survived.

== Family and early life ==
Balbilla's family were well-connected members of the royal family of the Kingdom of Commagene, a principality in what is now Turkey which was annexed by the Roman Empire. As well as Egyptian and Greek elements, Balbilla's ancestry included Armenian, Median, Syrian and Seleucian lines. Balbilla was the second child of Gaius Julius Archelaus Antiochus Epiphanes and Claudia Capitolina, a Greek woman born in Alexandria. Her older brother was Gaius Julius Antiochus Epiphanes Philopappos, one of the first men of eastern descent to become consul at Rome.

Balbilla's parents were distant cousins. Claudia Capitolina's paternal grandmother was Aka II of Commagene, the great-granddaughter of Antiochus I Theos of Commagene. Balbilla's father, was the first born child of Antiochus IV of Commagene and Julia Iotapa of Commagene. Both Antiochus IV and Iotapa were descendants of Antiochus I Theos.

Balbilla's maternal grandfather, after whom she was named, was Tiberius Claudius Balbilus, a Greek of Egyptian descent. He was an astrologer and a learned scholar. He became one of the highest ranking magistrates of the Equestrian order and was Prefect of Egypt from AD 55 to 59. Balbilus and his father, Thrasyllus of Mendes (Tiberius Claudius Thrasyllus), a grammarian and astrologer were friends of the first Roman emperors including Tiberius, Claudius and Vespasian.

Balbilla's paternal grandparents, Antiochus IV of Commagene and Queen Julia Iotapa were puppet rulers under Rome. Balbilla was born and raised in Rome in the household of her paternal grandfather, Antiochus IV. Prior to Balbilla's birth, Vespasian had ordered Antiochus IV to abdicate the throne of Commagene because of his alleged disloyalty to Rome. Antiochus IV and his brother, Callinicus, were accused of colluding with the Kingdom of Parthia against Rome. It is unknown whether these accusations were true. Vespasian gave Antiochus IV sufficient revenue for a luxurious life in Rome. This afforded Balbilla and her brother a traditional Greek education.

The family later moved to Athens where Balbilla's father, Epiphanes, died in AD 92 of unknown causes. Capitolina then returned to Alexandria where she married Marcus Junius Rufus, a Roman politician. Capitolina spent her remaining years in Alexandria. Balbilla lived with her for a time then returned to the home of her brother, Philopappos, in Athens.

Despite her aristocratic life, Balbilla's status in Rome may not have been secure as her father was not a senator. However, Philopappos did become a senator, serving as a consul until AD 109. When Philopappos died in AD 116, Balbilla built for him a burial monument, the Philopappos Monument, on Musaios Hill, south-west of the Acropolis in Athens.

== The Epigrams ==
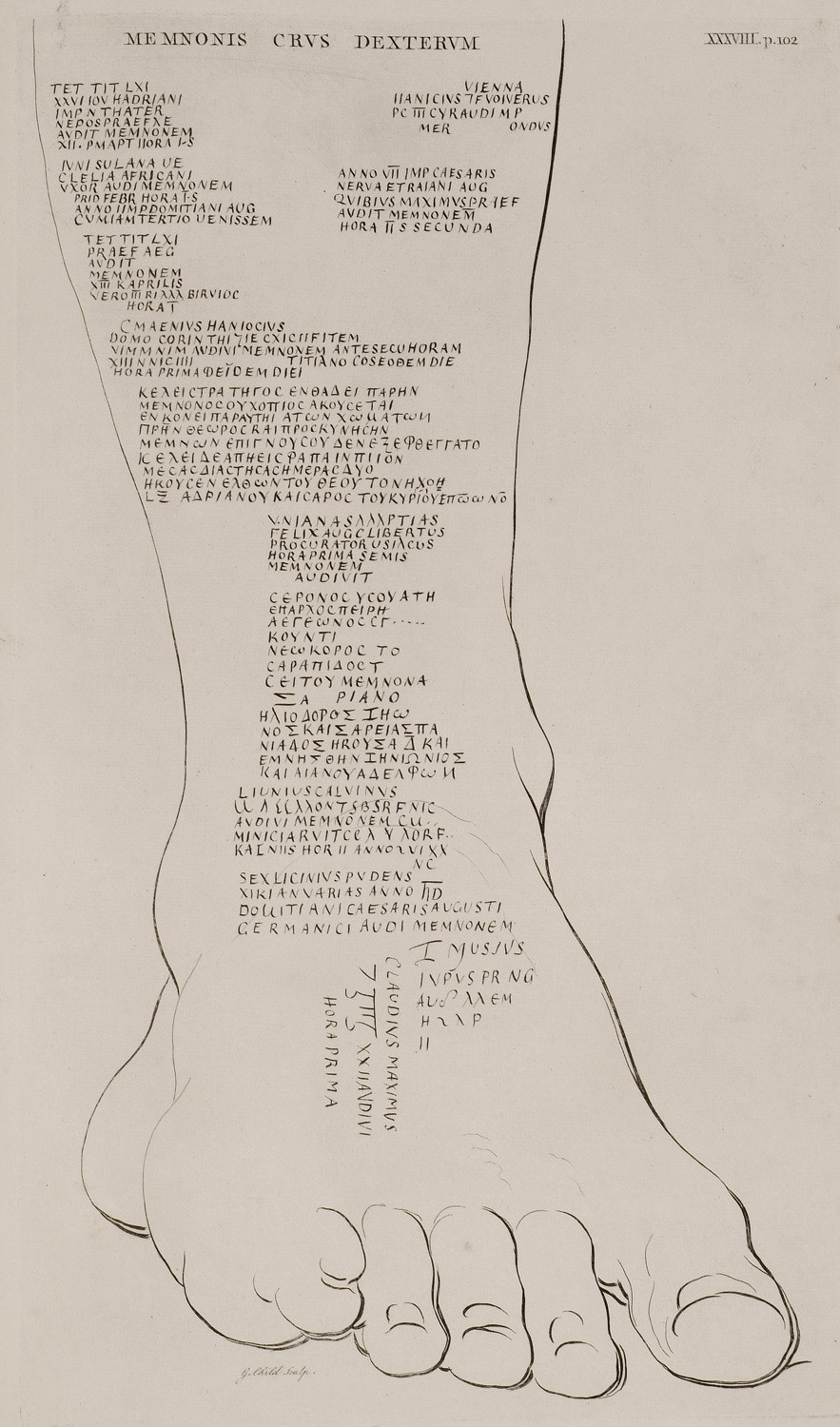
Memnon's right leg

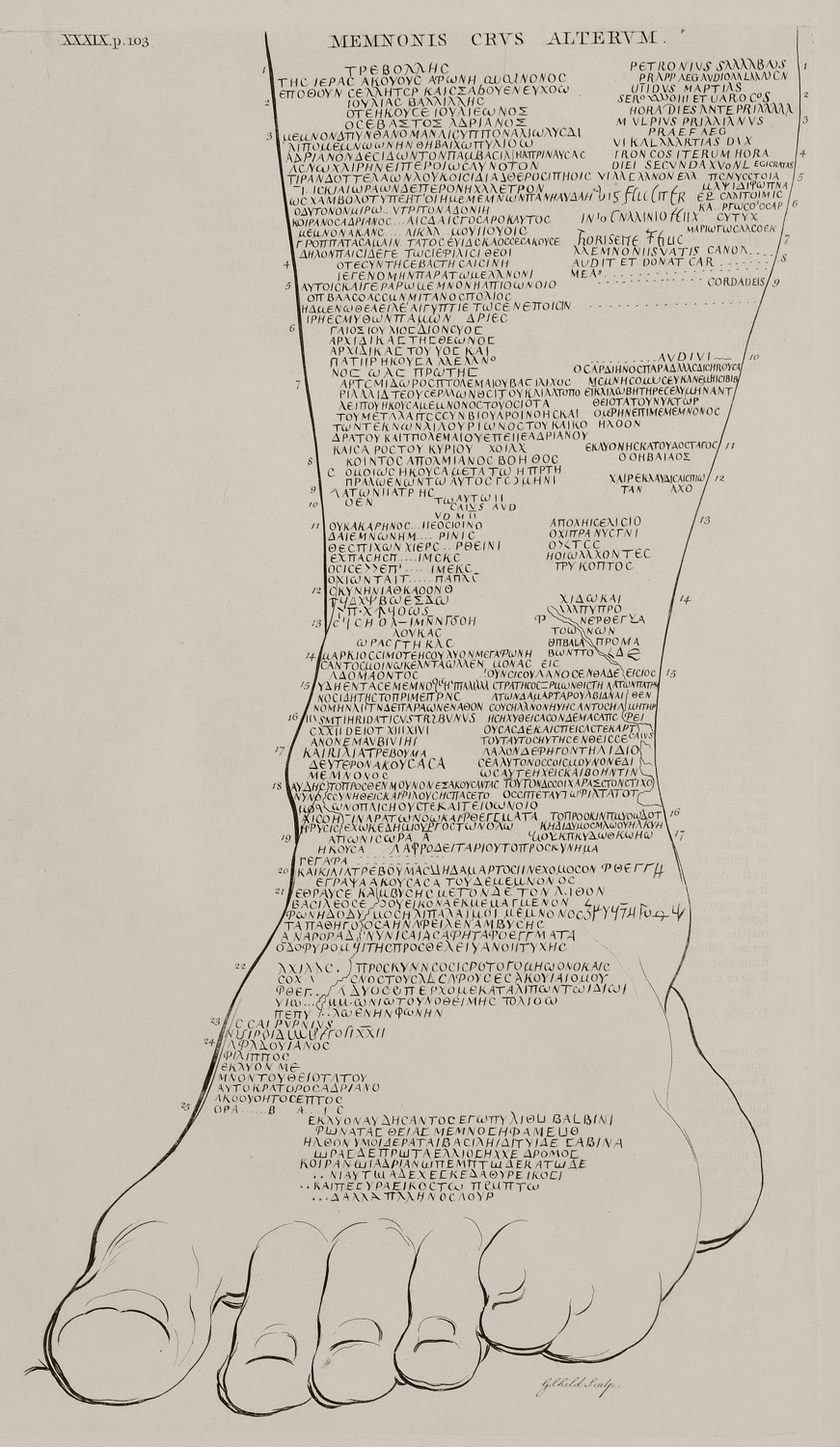
Memnon's left leg

Balbilla was a court poet and friend of Hadrian and companion or lady in waiting to his wife, Vibia Sabina. In AD 129, she accompanied them to the Valley of the Kings in Ancient Egypt. Balbilla was commissioned to record the party's return visit from 19 to 21 November 130. Balbilla inscribed three epigrams in Aeolic Greek, known as 'epigrammata', on the legs of the Colossi of Memnon. The statue may have reminded Balbilla of the sculptures on Mount Nemrut and the mausoleum of her ancestor, Antiochus I Theos of Commagene, the descendants of whom she references in her poems. Although the epigrammata were approved public inscriptions, in honor of the Roman imperial family, they are somewhat akin to graffiti. They have elements of wit, history and mythology written in an Homeric tone. The poems display good use of metaphors, verbal and sound echoes. Inspired by Sappho, Balbilla also used traditional lyric themes: the love of songs and a liking for the Muses.

The first and second epigrams tell the story of a mythical king of Ethiopia, Memnon, killed by Achilles at Troy, whom the god Zeus made immortal. Balbilla is not addressing Memnon but is flattering Hadrian and Sabina.

When the August Hadrian Heard Memnon

Memnon the Egyptian I learnt, when warmed by the rays of the sun,
speaks from Theban stone.
When he saw Hadrian, the king of all, before rays of the sun,
he greeted him - as far as he was able.
But when the Titan driving through the heavens with his steeds of white,
brought into shadow the second measure of hours,
like ringing bronze Memnon again sent out his voice.
Sharp-toned, he sent out his greeting and for a third time a mighty roar.
The emperor Hadrian then himself bid welcome to
Memnon and left on stone for generations to come.
This inscription recounting all that he saw and all that he heard.
It was clear to all that the gods love him.

When with the August Sabina I Stood Before Memnon

Memnon, son of Aurora and holy Tithon,
seated before Thebes, city of Zeus,
or Amenoth, Egyptian King, as learned.
Priests recount from ancient stories,
greetings, and singing, welcome her kindly,
the August wife of the emperor Hadrian.
A barbarian man cut off your tongue and ears:
Impious Cambyses; but he paid the penalty,
with a wretched death struck by the same sword point
with which pitiless he slew the divine Apis.
But I do not believe that this statue of yours will perish,
I saved your immortal spirit forever with my mind.
For my parents were noble, and my grandfathers,
the wise Balbillus and Antiochus the king.

When on the first day
We didn't hear Memnon

Yesterday Memnon received [Hadrian's] wife in silence,
so that the beautiful Sabina might come back here again.
For the lovely form of our queen pleases you.
When she arrives, send forth a divine shout,
so the king won't be angry with you. As it is now,
you've fearlessly detained for too long his noble wedded wife.
And Memnon, trembling at the power of Hadrian,
suddenly spoke, and she rejoiced to hear it.

Balbilla dedicates the third epigram to her parents and grandfathers and to her noble bloodline.

For pious were my parents and grandfathers:
Balbillus the Wise and King Antiochus;
Balbillus, the father of my mother of royal blood and King Antiochus, the father of my father. From their line I too draw my noble blood,
and these verses are mine, pious Balbilla.

After her poetry, no more is known about Balbilla.

A fourth epigram, in elegiac couplets, entitled and perhaps authored by a certain "Demo" or "Damo" is a dedication to the Muses. The poem is traditionally published with the works of Balbilla, though the internal evidence suggests a different author. In the poem, Demo explains that Memnon has shown her special respect. In return, Demo offers the gift for poetry, as a gift to the hero. At the end of this epigram, she addresses Memnon, highlighting his divine status by recalling his strength and holiness. Internal evidence on the leg of Memnon suggests that this poem was written at some point in or after AD 196.

Demo

Son of Aurora, I greet you. For you addressed me kindly,
Memnon, for the sake of the Pierides, who care for me,
song-loving Demo. And bearing a pleasant gift,
my lyre will always sing of your strength, holy one.

== Nerva–Antonine family tree ==
Nerva–Antonine family tree

Q. Marcius Barea Soranus	Q. Marcius Barea Sura	Antonia Furnilla	M. Cocceius Nerva	Sergia Plautilla	P. Aelius Hadrianus
Titus (r. 79–81)	Marcia Furnilla	Marcia	Trajanus Pater	Nerva (r. 96–98)	Ulpia (Note: Sister of Trajan's father: Giacosa (1977), p. 7.)	Aelius Hadrianus Marullinus
Flavia (Note: Giacosa (1977), p. 8.)	Marciana (Note: Levick (2014), p. 161.)	C. Salonius Matidius (Note: Husband of Ulpia Marciana: Levick (2014), p. 161.)	Trajan (r. 98–117)	Plotina	P. Acilius Attianus	P. Aelius Afer (Note: Giacosa (1977), p. 7.)	Paulina Major (Note: DIR contributor (Herbert W. Benario, 2000), "Hadrian".)
Lucius Mindius (2)	Libo Rupilius Frugi (3)	Salonia Matidia (Note: Giacosa (1977), p. 9.)	L. Vibius Sabinus (1) (Note: Husband of Salonia Matidia: Levick (2014), p. 161.)
Paulina Minor	L. Julius Ursus Servianus (Note: Smith (1870), "Julius Servianus".)
Matidia Minor	Sabina	Hadrian (Note: Smith (1870), "Hadrian", pp. 319–322.) (r. 117–138)	Antinous (Note: Lover of Hadrian: Lambert (1984), p. 99 and passim; deification: Lambert (1984), pp. 2–5, etc.)
C. Fuscus Salinator I	Julia Serviana Paulina
M. Annius Verus (Note: Husband of Rupilia Faustina: Levick (2014), p. 163.)	Rupilia Faustina (Note: Levick (2014), p. 163.) (Note: It is uncertain whether Rupilia Faustina was Frugi's daughter by Salonia Matidia or another woman.)	Boionia Procilla	Cn. Arrius Antoninus
L. Ceionius Commodus	Appia Severa	C. Fuscus Salinator II
L. Caesennius Paetus	Arria Antonina	Arria Fadilla (Note: Levick (2014), p. 162.)	T. Aurelius Fulvus
L. Caesennius Antoninus	L. Commodus	Plautia	unknown (Note: Levick (2014), p. 164.)	C. Avidius Nigrinus
M. Annius Verus	Calvisia Domitia Lucilla (Note: Wife of M. Annius Verus: Giacosa (1977), p. 10.)	Fundania (Note: Wife of M. Annius Libo: Levick (2014), p. 163.)	M. Annius Libo	Faustina	Antoninus Pius (r. 138–161)	L. Aelius Caesar	Avidia
Cornificia	Marcus Aurelius (r. 161–180) (Note: Giacosa (1977), p. 10.)	Faustina Minor	Aurelia Fadilla	Lucius Verus (r. 161–169) (1)	Ceionia Fabia	Plautius Quintillus (Note: Husband of Ceionia Fabia: Levick (2014), p. 164.)	Q. Servilius Pudens	Ceionia Plautia
Cornificia Minor (Note: Levick (2014), p. 117.)	M. Petronius Sura	Commodus (r. 177–192)	Fadilla	M. Annius Verus Caesar	Ti. Claudius Pompeianus (2)	Lucilla	M. Plautius Quintillus	Junius Licinius Balbus	Servilia Ceionia
Petronius Antoninus	L. Aurelius Agaclytus (2)	Aurelia Sabina	L. Antistius Burrus (1)	Plautius Quintillus	Plautia Servilla	C. Furius Sabinus Timesitheus	Maecia Faustina	Junius Licinius Balbus?
Furia Sabinia Tranquillina	Gordian III (r. 238–244)

- (1) = 1st spouse
- (2) = 2nd spouse
- (3) = 3rd spouse
- Reddish-purple indicates emperor of the Nerva–Antonine dynasty
  lighter purple indicates designated imperial heir of said dynasty who never reigned
  grey indicates unsuccessful imperial aspirants
  bluish-purple indicates emperors of other dynasties
- dashed lines indicate adoption; dotted lines indicate love affairs/unmarried relationships
- Small Caps = posthumously deified (Augusti, Augustae, or other)

Notes:

Except where otherwise noted, the notes below indicate that an individual's parentage is as shown in the above family tree.

References:
- DIR contributors (2000). "De Imperatoribus Romanis: An Online Encyclopedia of Roman Rulers and Their Families".
- Giacosa, Giorgio (1977). Women of the Caesars: Their Lives and Portraits on Coins. Translated by Holloway, R. Ross. Milan: Edizioni Arte e Moneta. ISBN 0-8390-0193-2.
- Lambert, Royston (1984). Beloved and God: The Story of Hadrian and Antinous. New York: Viking. ISBN 0-670-15708-2.
- Levick, Barbara (2014). Faustina I and II: Imperial Women of the Golden Age. Oxford University Press. ISBN 978-0-19-537941-9.
- Smith, William, ed. (1870). Dictionary of Greek and Roman Biography and Mythology.

== Ancestry ==
Ancestors of Julia Balbilla

16. (=18., 20., 22., 26.)King Mithridates III of Commagene
8. (=10.)King Antiochus III of Commagene
17. (=19., 21., 23.)Princess Iotapa of Media Atropatene
4. King Antiochus IV of Commagene
18. (=16., 20., 22., 26.)King Mithridates III of Commagene
9. (=11.)Princess Iotapa of Commagene
19. (=17., 21., 23.)Princess Iotapa of Media Atropatene
2. Gaius Julius Archelaus Antiochus Epiphanes
20. (=16., 18., 22., 26.)King Mithridates III of Commagene
10. (=8.)King Antiochus III of Commagene
21. (=17., 19., 23.)Princess Iotapa of Media Atropatene
5. Princess Iotapa of Commagene
22. (=16., 18., 20., 26.)King Mithridates III of Commagene
11. (=9.)Princess Iotapa of Commagene
23. (=17., 19., 21.)Princess Iotapa of Media Atropatene
1. Julia Balbilla
12. Thrasyllus of Mendes
6. Tiberius Claudius Balbilus
26. (=16., 18., 20., 22.)King Mithridates III of Commagene
13. Aka II of Commagene
27. (=17., 19., 21., 23.)Princess Iotapa of Media Atropatene
3. Claudia Capitolina

== Fictional references ==
- The Emperor by Georg Ebers (1880).
- Memoirs of Hadrian by Marguerite Yourcenar (1951)
- Opus Gemini (part of the Romanike series) by Codex Regious (2014).
- The Glass Ball Game radio play (part of the Caesar! series by Mike Walker.
