= Atropatene =

Ancient Iranian kingdom (c. 323 BC – 226 AD)

Coordinates: 37°N 48°E

Atropatene Ātṛpātakāna
- c. 323 BC–226 AD
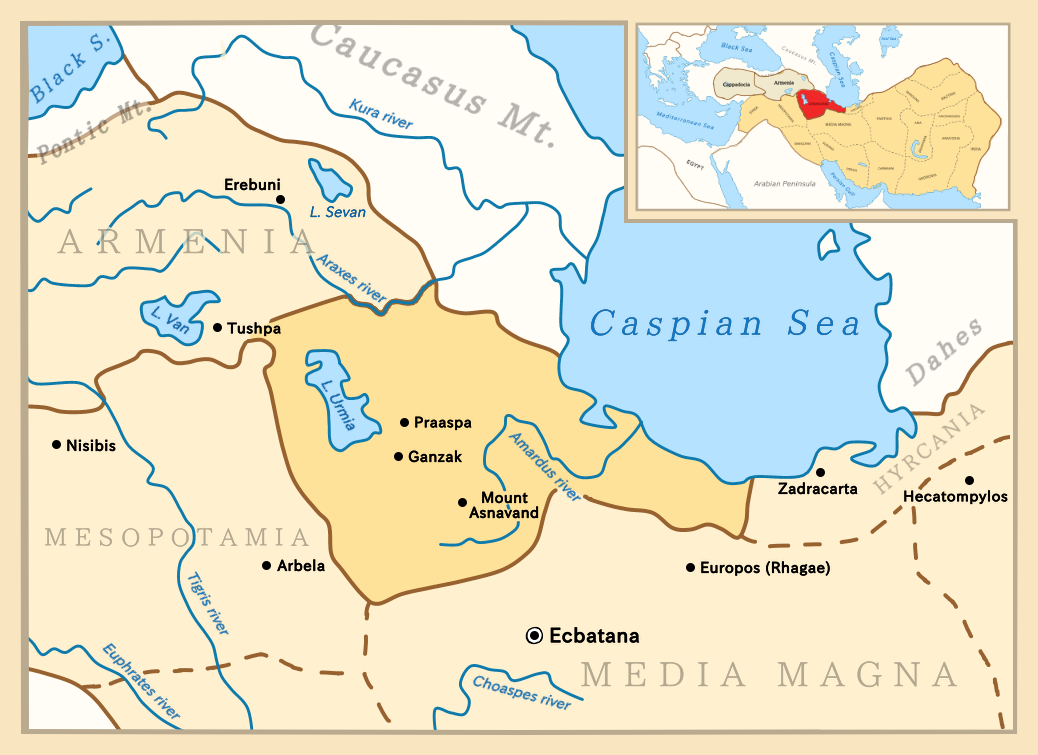
- Atropatene as a vassal of Seleucids in 221 BC
- Status: Autonomous state, frequently a vassal of the Parthian Empire (148/7 BC–226 AD)
- Capital: Ganzak
- Common languages: Iranian language
- Religion: Zoroastrianism
- Government: Monarchy
- King
- Historical era: Antiquity
  - Established: c. 323 BC
  - Disestablished: 226 AD
Preceded by	Succeeded by
Macedonian Empire	Adurbadagan

Atropatene (Old Persian: Ātṛpātakāna; Middle Persian: Ādurbādagān; Ancient Greek: Ἀτροπατηνή), also known as Atropatia (Note: Ancient Greek: Ἀτροπατία, romanized: Atropatía; Latin: Atropatia.) or Atropatian Media (Ancient Greek: Ἀτροπάτιος Μηδία, romanized: Atropátios Mēdía; Latin: Media Atropatene), was an ancient Iranian kingdom established in c. 323 BC by the Persian satrap Atropates (Old Persian: *Ātṛpāta). The kingdom, mostly centered around the present-day Azerbaijan region in northwestern Iran, was ruled by Atropates' descendants until the early 1st-century AD, when the Parthian Arsacid dynasty supplanted them. It was conquered by the Sasanians in 226, and turned into a province governed by a marzban ("margrave"). Atropatene was the only Iranian region to remain under Zoroastrian authority from the Achaemenids to the Arab conquest without interruption, aside from being briefly ruled by the Macedonian king Alexander the Great (r. 336–323 BC).

The Old Persian name Ātṛpātakāna is the direct ancestor of the name of the historic Azerbaijan region in Iran.

== Name ==
According to Strabo, the name of Atropatene derived from the name of Atropates, the commander of the Achaemenid Empire. As he writes in his book “Geography”: "Media is divided into two parts. One part of it is called Greater Media, of which the metropolis is Ecbatana. The other part is Atropatian Media, which got its name from the commander Atropates, who prevented also this country, which was a part of Greater Media, from becoming subject to the Macedonians".

From the name of Atropates, different forms of the name of this country such as Atropatene, Atropatios Mēdia, Tropatene, Aturpatakan, Adarbayjan were used in different sources. Nevertheless, medieval Arab geographers suggested another version associating this name with Adorbador (the name of a priest) that means “guardian of the fire”.

== History ==
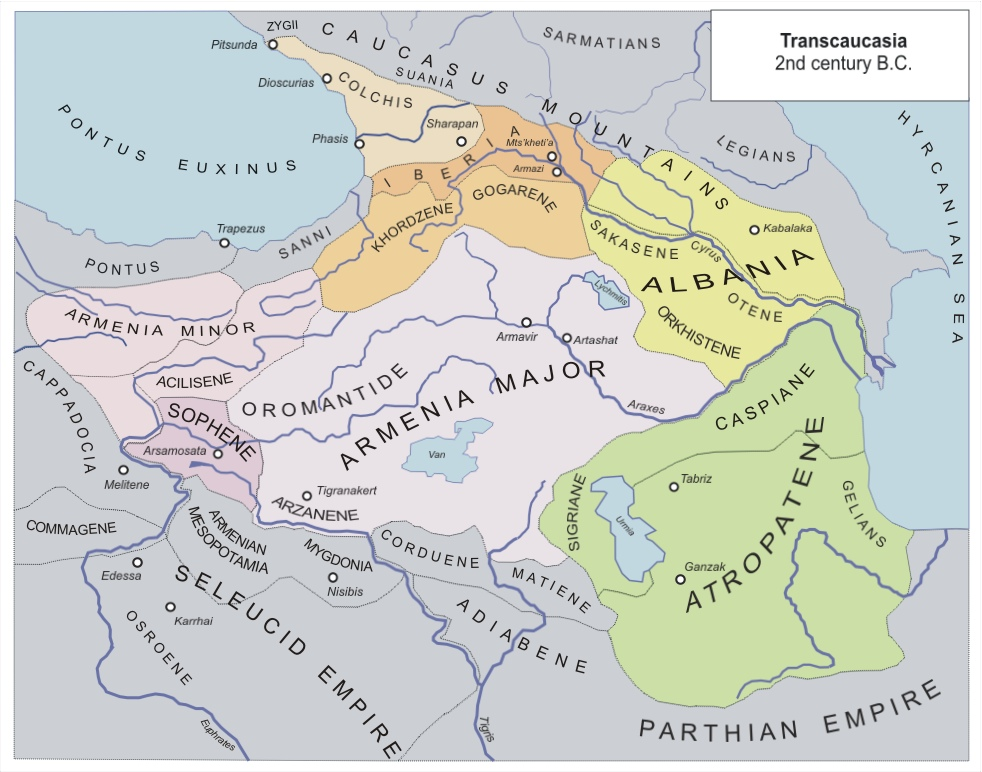
Atropatene and neighbouring countries at the beginning of the 2nd century B.C.

In 331 BC, during the Battle of Gaugamela between the Achaemenid ruler Darius III and Alexander the Great, Medes, Albans, Sakasens, Cadusians fought alongside the army of the Achaemenid Great King in the army of Atropates. After this war, which resulted in the victory of Alexander the Great and the fall of the Achaemenid Empire, Atropates expressed his loyalty to Alexander. In 328-327 BC, Alexander appointed him governor of Media. Following the death of Alexander the Great in 323 BC, the Macedonian's conquests were divided amongst the diadochi at the Partition of Babylon. The former Achaemenid satrapy of Media was divided into two states: The greater (southern) part – Media Magna was assigned to Peithon, one of Alexander's bodyguards.

The smaller (northern) region, which had been the sub-satrapy of Matiene, became Media Atropatene under Atropates, the former Achaemenid governor of all Media, who had by then become father-in-law of Perdiccas, regent of Alexander's designated successor. Shortly thereafter, Atropates refused to pay allegiance to Seleucus, and made Media Atropatene an independent kingdom. In 223 BCE, Antiochus III came to power in the Seleucid Empire, one of the Hellenistic states that had emerged following the death of Alexander. Antiochus attacked Atropatene, resulting in a victory.

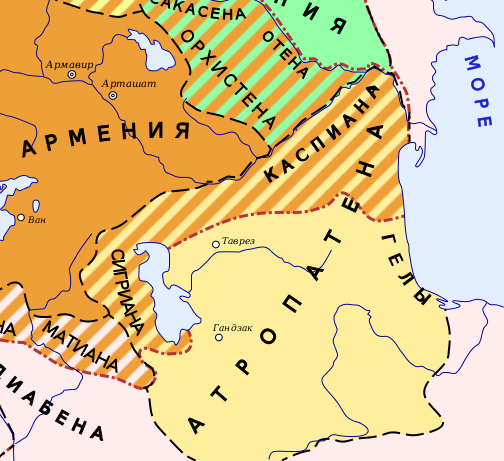
The shaded areas are the territories of Atropatene (Sigriane and Caspiane), which were lost in the 2nd century BC and annexed to Armenia by king Artaxias I (190—160 B.C.)

Consequently, the king of Atropatene, Artabazanes, accepted the ascendency of Seleucids and became dependent on it; on the other hand, interior independence was preserved. At the same time, the Roman Empire came into sight in the Mediterranean basin and was trying to spread its power in the East, and in 190 B.C., its army met and defeated the Seleucids' army in the battle of Magnesia. Parthia and Atropatene subsequently considered Rome a threat to their independence and allied themselves in the struggle against Rome.

After the battle between Rome and the Parthians in 38 BC, the Romans won and the Roman general Antony attacked Fraaspa (36 BC), one of the central cities of Atropatene. The city was surrounded by strong defenses. After a long blockade, Antony receded, losing approximately thirty-five thousand soldiers. In the face of Parthian attempts to annex Atropatene, Atropatene began to draw closer to Rome, thus, Ariobarzan II, who came to power in Atropatene in 20 BC, lived in Rome for about ten years. The dynasty Atropates founded would rule the kingdom for several centuries, first independently, then as vassals of the Arsacids (who called it 'Aturpatakan'). It was later supplanted by a line of the Arsacids.

During the late Parthian era, after Pharasmanes II of Iberia devastated Media Atropatene and forced Parthia to pay tribute in 134-135 AD, empire was significantly damaged, resulting in the weakening of hold over western and northern Iran. The Iranologist Touraj Daryaee argues that the reign of the Parthian monarch Vologases V (r. 191–208) was "the turning point in Arsacid history, in that the dynasty lost much of its prestige." The people of Atropatene (both nobility and peasantry) allied themselves with the Persian Sasanian prince Ardashir I (r. 224–242) during his wars against Vologases V's son and second successor Artabanus IV (r. 216–224). In 226, Atropatene submitted with little resistance to Ardashir I after he had defeated and killed Artabanus IV at the Battle of Hormozdgan. Ardashir I and his son and heir Shapur I (r. 240–270) are depicted in a rock relief near Salmas, possibly a testimonial to the Sasanian conquest of Atropatene. The nobility of Atropatene most likely allied themselves the Sasanians due to a desire for a strong state capable of maintaining order. The priesthood, who may have felt alienated by the easy-going Arsacids, probably also supported the Sasanian family, due to its association with Zoroastrianism.

== Zoroastrianism ==
The oldness of Zoroastrianism led to lack of knowledge about the geography of the Avesta, and also uncertainty about the birthplace of its prophet, Zoroaster. As a result local claims emerged quite easily, and with the appropriate support, even gained acceptance. This resulted in the birthplace of Zoroaster being placed in Atropatene, rather than the east, where he originated.

== Capital ==
The main Achaemenid hub in Atropatene was Ganzak (from Median: Ganzaka, meaning "treasury"), which presumably served as the capital of Atropates and his successors. The city was situated in a fertile area near Lake Urmia, close to the modern town of Miandoab. The city and its surroundings probably hosted a large Iranian population, whereas much of the Atropatenian population had most likely not been completely Iranianized yet by the 3rd-century BC.

== Legacy ==
Atropatene was the only Iranian region to remain under Zoroastrian authority from the Achaemenids to the Arab conquest without any interruption, aside from being briefly ruled by the Macedonian king Alexander the Great (r. 336–323 BC). Under the Atropatids, the region successfully managed to gain a dominant place in Zoroastrianism, which would continue into the Sasanian period, whose monarchs favored Median traditions over that of the Parthians. Moreover, Atropatene also served as a stronghold of Iranian culture.

== List of rulers ==
Albeit the kings of Atropatene ruled for several centuries, only some of them are known. The dates of their reign are uncertain.

Name	Reign
House of Atropates
Atropates	fl. 323 BC
Artabazanes	fl. 221 BC
Mithridates I	fl. 67 BC
Darius I	fl. 65 BC
Ariobarzanes I	fl. 59 BC
Artavasdes I	fl. ???–30 BC
Asinnalus	fl. 30 BC
Ariobarzanes II	r. 28/20 BC – 4 AD
Artavasdes II	r. 4–6
Arsacid dynasty
Artabanus	r. ???–12
Vonones	r. 12–51
Pacorus	r. 51–???

== Bibliography ==
=== Ancient works ===
- Strabo. Geographica.
  - Hamilton, H. C.; Falconer, W., eds. (1856). The Geography of Strabo. Vol. 2. London: Henry G. Bohn.

=== Modern works ===
- Bizarus, Petrus (1601). Persicarum rerum historia.
- Bosse, Frans Antoni (1818). Geographiae antiquae compendium.
- Bosworth, C.E. (1989), "Azerbaijan IV: Islamic History to 1941", Encyclopaedia Iranica, vol. 3, London: Routledge & Kegan Paul
- Boyce, Mary; Grenet, Frantz (1991). Beck, Roger (ed.). A History of Zoroastrianism, Zoroastrianism under Macedonian and Roman Rule. Leiden: Brill. ISBN 978-9004293915.
- Boyce, Mary (2000). "Ganzak". In Yarshater, Ehsan (ed.). Encyclopædia Iranica. Vol. X/3: Fruit–Gāvbāzī. London and New York: Routledge & Kegan Paul. pp. 289–290. ISBN 978-0-933273-47-4.
- Buttrick, George Arthur, ed. (1956). The Interpreter's Bible. Vol. 6.
- Chaumont, M. L. (1987). "Atropates". In Yarshater, Ehsan (ed.). Encyclopædia Iranica. Vol. III/1: Ātaš–Awāʾel al-Maqālāt. London and New York: Routledge & Kegan Paul. pp. 17–18. ISBN 978-0-71009-113-0.
- Daryaee, Touraj (2010). "Ardashir and the Sasanians' Rise to Power". Anabasis: Studia Classica et Orientalia. 1. University of California: 236–255.
- de Planhol, X. (1987). "Azerbaijan i. Geography". In Yarshater, Ehsan (ed.). Encyclopædia Iranica. Vol. III/2: Awāʾel al-maqālāt–Azerbaijan IV. London and New York: Routledge & Kegan Paul. pp. 205–215. ISBN 978-0-71009-114-7.
- Ghodrat-Dizaji, Mehrdad (2007). "Administrative Geography of the Early Sasanian Period: The Case of Ādurbādagān". Iran: Journal of the British Institute of Persian Studies. 45 (1): 87–93. doi:10.1080/05786967.2007.11864720. S2CID 133088896.
- Ghodrat-Dizaji, Mehrdad (2010). "Ādurbādagān during the Late Sasanian Period: A Study in Administrative Geography". Iran: Journal of the British Institute of Persian Studies. 48 (1): 69–80. doi:10.1080/05786967.2010.11864774. S2CID 163839498.
- Ghodrat-Dizaji, Mehrdad (2011). "Disintegration of Sasanian Hegemony over Northern Iran". Iranica Antiqua. 46: 153–302. doi:10.2143/IA.46.0.2084424.
- Gregoratti, Leonardo (2017). "The Arsacid Empire". In Daryaee, Touraj (ed.). King of the Seven Climes: A History of the Ancient Iranian World (3000 BCE - 651 CE). UCI Jordan Center for Persian Studies. pp. 1–236. ISBN 9780692864401.
- Hutter, Manfred (2009). "Zoroaster iii. Zoroaster in the Avesta". In Yarshater, Ehsan (ed.). Encyclopædia Iranica (Online ed.). Encyclopædia Iranica Foundation.
- Kia, Mehrdad (2016). The Persian Empire: A Historical Encyclopedia. ABC-CLIO. ISBN 978-1610693912. (2 volumes)
- Malandra, W. W. (2009). "Zoroaster ii. General Survey". In Yarshater, Ehsan (ed.). Encyclopædia Iranica (Online ed.). Encyclopædia Iranica Foundation.
- Mayrhofer, M. (1973). Onomastica Persepolitana (in German). Vienna.
- Mukherjee, Bratindra Nath (1972). The Pāradas.
- Olbrycht, Marek Jan (2021). Early Arsakid Parthia (ca. 250-165 B.C.). Brill. ISBN 978-9004460751.
- Olbrycht, Marek Jan (2014). "The Genealogy of Artabanos II (AD 8/9–39/40), King of Parthia". Miscellanea Anthropologica et Sociologica. 15 (3): 92–97. doi:10.5604/20842937.1134333 (inactive 11 July 2025).
- Schippmann, K. (1987). "Azerbaijan III. Pre-Islamic History". In Yarshater, Ehsan (ed.). Encyclopædia Iranica. Vol. III/2: Awāʾel al-maqālāt–Azerbaijan IV. London and New York: Routledge & Kegan Paul. pp. 221–224. ISBN 978-0-71009-114-7.
