= Iotapa (daughter of Artavasdes I) =

Iotapa was a princess of Media Atropatene, daughter of King Artavasdes I of Media Atropatene. She was Queen consort of King Mithridates III of Commagene.

Iotapa was of Median, Armenian and Greek descent. She was the daughter and one of the children born to King Artavasdes I of Media Atropatene.

In 33 BC, she was engaged to her distant relative, the Ptolemaic Prince Alexander Helios, son of Greek Ptolemaic Queen Cleopatra VII of Egypt and Roman Triumvir Mark Antony. In 30 BC Iotapa was returned to her father after Octavian (future Roman Emperor Augustus) took Alexandria.
