= Artavasdes IV =

- King Of Armenia

King of Armenia
- Reign: 4 AD – 6 AD
- Predecessor: Ariobarzanes II
- Successor: Tigranes V and Erato
- Born: 20 BC
- Died: 6 AD
- Father: Ariobarzanes II

Artavasdes IV of Armenia; also known as Artavasdes II of Atropatene; Artavasdes II of Media Atropatene and Armenia Major; Artavasdes II, and Artavasdes (20 BC – 6 AD) was an Iranian prince who served as King of Media Atropatene. During his reign of Media Atropatene, Artavasdes also served as a Roman Client King of Armenia Major.

== Family background and early life ==
Artavasdes was the first son born to King Ariobarzanes II of Atropatene by an unnamed wife. He had a younger brother called Gaius Julius Ariobarzanes I and may have had a possible nephew called Gaius Julius Ariobarzanes II. Artavasdes was the namesake of his paternal grandfather, a previous ruling King of Media Atropatene and Sophene, Artavasdes I. He was born and raised in Media Atropatene.

== Kingship of Media Atropatene and Armenia ==
The father of Artavasdes, Ariobarzanes II died on June 26, 4 and Artavasdes succeeded his father as King of Media Atropatene and Armenia. Like his father, Artavasdes in his kingship of Media Atropatene and Armenia, based his rule at Artagira, which his late father made the city, their capital. As Artavasdes, was both King of Media Atropatene and Armenia, as King of Media Atropatene he is known as Artavasdes II and as King of Armenia, he is known as Artavasdes III.

Unfortunately, the reign of Artavasdes didn't last. As his father, as King was respected by his subjects, this was the opposite for Artavasdes. As a ruling King, over the Atropatenians and Armenians, he proved to be an unpopular monarch. In 6, Artavasdes was quickly killed by his subjects.

In his Kingship of Media Atropatene, Artavasdes was succeeded by his paternal first cousin Artabanus and in the Kingship of Armenia the Roman emperor Augustus, appointed the Herodian Prince Tigranes. Artavasdes from an unnamed wife was survived by a son called Gaius Julius Artavasdes.

== Coinage and inscription evidence ==
Coinage has survived from the reign of Artavasdes. They have been dated from 2 until 10. An example of this is on one surviving coin dated from his reign, is on the obverse side shows the head of Augustus with the Greek inscription ΘΕΟΥ ΚΑΙΣΑΡΟΣ ΕΥΕΡΓΕΤΟΥ which means of Caesar, the God, the Benefactor, while on the reverse side shows the head of Artavasdes, with the Greek inscription ΒΑΣΙΛΕΩΣ ΜΕΓΑΛΟΥ ΑΡΤΑΥΑΖΔΟΥ which means of Great King Artavasdes.

Artavasdes is mentioned in paragraphs 27 and 33 of the Res Gestae Divi Augusti. In Rome, two Epitaph inscriptions have been found bearing the name of an Artavasdes. The Epitaphs are probably of the son and the grandson of a Median Atropatenian King called Ariobarzanes. However it is uncertain, if the Ariobarzanes refers to Ariobarzanes I or Ariobarzanes II.

== Note ==
Although archaeological evidence reveals and shows that Artavasdes is the son of Ariobarzanes II, there is some confusion, and there are different, various theories on the origins of Artavasdes. Some modern historical sources and reference books state that he is a son of Artavasdes II of Armenia. While others state he is either a brother or a paternal first cousin of Tigranes IV and Erato. In fact, Artavasdes through his father was a distant relative of Artavasdes II of Armenia, Tigranes IV and Erato.

== Sources ==
- Res Gestae Divi Augusti, 1st century
- H. Temporini & W. Haase, Aufstieg und Niedergang der römischen Welt: Geschichte und Kultur Roms im spiegel der neueren Forschung, Walter de Gruyter
- P.M. Swan, The Augustan Succession: An Historical Commentary on Cassius Dio's Roman History, Books 55–56 (9 B.C.–A.D. 14) (Google eBook), Oxford University Press, 2004
- M. Bunsen, Encyclopedia of the Roman Empire, Infobase Printing, 2009
- Edited by Timothy Venning, A Chronology of the Roman Empire, Continuum International Publishing Group, 2011
- Regal coinage of Armenia
- Ptolemaic Genealogy: Affiliated Lines, Descendant Lines
- Azerbaijan iii. Pre-Islamic History, Atropates, Persian satrap of Media, made himself independent in 321 B.C. Thereafter Greek and Latin writers named the territory as Media Atropatene or, less frequently, Media Minor: Parthian period

Regnal titles
Preceded by Ariobarzanes II	King of Atropatene; 4 – 6	Succeeded by Artabanus III
Preceded by Ariobarzanes II	King of Armenia; 4 – 6	Succeeded by Tigranes V
