= Azerbaijan province (Safavid Iran) =

Province of Safavid Iran

Province of Azerbaijan استان آذربایجان
- 1501–1736
- Status: Province of Safavid Iran
- Capital: Tabriz
- Common languages: Persian, Azerbaijani, Kurdish, Armenian, Syriac
Succeeded by
Afsharid Iran
- Today part of: Iran; Azerbaijan; Armenia

The province of Azerbaijan (Persian: استان آذربایجان, romanized: ostān-e āzarbāyjān) was a province in the northwestern part of Safavid Iran, serving as one of its principal administrative areas. The city of Tabriz was the provincial capital, as well as the capital of the Safavids until 1555. The Ottoman Empire occupied Tabriz and a large portion of Azerbaijan from 1588 to 1603; as a result, the authority of the governor-general of Azerbaijan was mainly restricted to Ardabil.

== History ==
The Azerbaijan province was created in the first half of the 16th century. It included such regions as Maragheh, Urmia, Mahabad, Khoy, Salmas, Marand, Talish (between 1592 and 1610), Arasbar, Sultaniya, Zanjan, etc. Agriculture, cattle breeding, and handicrafts were developed in the Azerbaijan. Despite the transfer of the capital of Safavid Iran to Qazvin (1555), and later to Isfahan (1598), Azerbaijan, being from a strategic and socio-economic point of view one of the richest and most important regions of Iran, played a large role in the political and economic life of the country. One fifth of the personnel of the Safavid army (about 11 to 12 thousand people out of 60 000) accounted for Azerbaijan. The most influential Qizilbash emirs (mainly the heads of the Tekkelu and Turkman tribes) were appointed governors of Azerbaijan.

In 1531, Ulameh Soltan Tekkelu was the governor. The Tekkelu tribe, whose head was Ulameh Soltan Tekkelu, was a branch of the Turkoman Tekkelu tribe and moved to Azerbaijan from Asia Minor. Later, the management of Azerbaijan passed to the emirs from other Turkman dynasties. In 1583/84, at the insistence of the emirs from the Shamlu and Ustajlu clan, the head of the Turkman tribe, Emir Khan, was removed from running the province. This became the cause of bloody clashes between the Qizilbash. The Emir Khan was also supported by the Tekkelu. These events put Iran in a difficult position, which was at war with the Ottoman Empire. As a result, the control of Azerbaijan again passed to the Turkmans. In 1590–1605, the territory of Azerbaijan was under the control of the Ottoman Empire (with the exception of Talish, Karadagh and Ardabil). During the reign of Shah Abbas I (1587–1629 years of rule), after the reconquest of Azerbaijan, in 1605, the control again passed to the Turkman emir, Pir Budaq Khan Pornak.

== Subdivisions ==
The Province of Azerbaijan consisted of the districts of: Astara, Maragheh the Afshar tribe, Qaraja-Dagh, Chors, Gavrud, Qapanat, Adarba tribe, Hashtarud, Muk, Lahijan, Dunbuli tribe, Ujarud, Abdallu (a subdivision of the Shamlu tribe), Sarab, Shaqaqi tribe, Zunuz, Mishkin, Mughanat, Pishk, Lak tribe of Salmas, Qara-Aghaj, Inallu tribe.

Sultaniyah and Zanjan were, properly speaking, laid outside of the province of Azerbaijan, but Father Sanson, who made an account of Safavid Iran, placed Zanjan in the administration of Tabriz.

== List of governors ==
This is a list of the known figures who governed Azerbaijan or parts of it. Beglerbegi, hakem and vali were all administrative titles designating the governor.

Date	Governor	Observations
1501–1503	Elyas Beg Eyghut-oghlu Khonoslu	Hakem of Tabriz
1503–1509	Hossein Beg Laleh Shamlu	Hakem of Tabriz
1509–1514	Mohammad Beg Sofrechi Ustajlu	Hakem of Tabriz
1514	Durmish Khan Shamlu (?)	Hakem of Tabriz
1514	Montasha Soltan Ustajlu	Hakem of Azerbaijan
1524–?	Mohammad Khan Tekkelu	Hakem of Tabriz
1530	Musa Soltan Torkaman	Hakem of Azerbaijan
1531	Ulameh Soltan Tekkelu	Vali of Azerbaijan
1532–1534	Musa Beg Mawsillu	Hakem of Azerbaijan and hakem or vali of Tabriz
1534–1573	None	Occasionally part of the crown domain
?–1559–?	Amir Gheyb Beg Ustajlu	Hakem of Tabriz
1562s	Khvajeh Qasem Ali	Vizier of Azerbaijan, stayed at the court
1573	Yusof Beg Ustajlu	Hakem of Azerbaijan
1573–?	Allahqoli Beg ibn Shahqoli Soltan	Hakem of Tabriz
1577–1584	Amir Khan Mawsillu	Hakem or beglerbegi of Tabriz and vali or beglerbegi of Azerbaijan
1584	Aliqoli Khan Ustajlu	Hakem of Tabriz and beglerbegi of Azerbaijan
1585	Hoseynqoli Khan Ustajlu	Brother of the previous governor. Hakem of Tabriz
1586	Mohammad Khan Tokhmaq Ustajlu	Hakem of Tabriz and beglerbegi of Azerbaijan
1588–1603	None	Occupied by the Ottoman Empire
1589–1591	Mehdiqoli Khan Ustajlu	Hakem of Ardabil
1590–?	Haqqverdi Soltan	Hakem of Tabriz
1593	Farhad Khan Qaramanlu	Amir al-omara of Azerbaijan
1593–1605	Dhu'l-Feqar Qaramanlu	Amir al-omara of Azerbaijan
1605–1616	Pir Budaq Khan Pornak	Hakem of Tabriz and amir al-omara of the frontier zone
1616–1618	Shahbandeh Khan Torkman	First tenure. Amir al-omara of Azerbaijan and hakem of Tabriz
1618–1620	Qarachaqay Khan	Beglerbegi of Azerbaijan and hakem and amir al-omara of Tabriz
1620–1625	Shahbandeh Khan Torkman	Second tenure. Beglerbegi of Azerbaijan
1625–1635	Pir Budaq Khan Pornak Torkman	First tenure. Hakem and amir al-omara of Azerbaijan. Eqta'dar of Tabriz. He was three years old at the time of his appointment
1635–1643	Rostam Khan	Hakem and eqta'dar of Tabriz, beglerbegi of Azerbaijan. Also sepahsalar (commander-in-chief)
1643–1650	Pir Budaq Khan Pornak Torkman	Second tenure. Hakem of Tabriz and beglerbegi of Azerbaijan. Also sepahsalar (commander-in-chief)
1652–1654	Aliqoli Khan Davalu	Hakem of Tabriz
1655–1664	Mortezaqoli Khan Qajar	Beglerbegi of Azerbaijan. Also qorchi-bashi
1680	Hajji Ali Khan	Beglerbegi of Tabriz
1694	Rostam Khan	Beglerbegi of Azerbaijan. Also sepahsalar and tofangchi-aghasi
1695	Ansusheh Khan	Vali of Tabriz
1696	Mohammad Taleb Khan	Beglerbegi of Tabriz
1697	Loft Ali Beg	Beglerbegi of Tabriz
1702	Musa Beg	Hakem of Tabriz. Also qollar-aghasi
1711–?	Mohammad Zaman Khan	Hakem of Tabriz and Kerman. Also sepahsalar
?–1715	Mansur Khan Shahseven Moghani	Possibly beglerbegi of Tabriz. Also sepahsalar
1715–1718	Safiqoli Khan Ziyad-oghlu Qajar	Beglerbegi of Tabriz. Also sepahsalar
1719–1720	Mohammad-Ali Khan	Beglerbegi of Azerbaijan
1720–1721	Mikhri (Mehdi?) Khan	Hakem of Tabriz
1721	Mohammad Khan Begdeli Shamlu	Beglerbegi of Azerbaijan

== See also ==
- List of Safavid governors of Erivan

== Sources ==
- "Azerbaijani Soviet Encyclopedia". National Academy of Sciences of Azerbaijan. 1986.
- Петрушевский, И. П. (1949). "Очерки по истории феодальных отношений в Азербайджане и Армении в XVI - начале XIX вв".
- Floor, Willem (2008). Titles and Emoluments in Safavid Iran: A Third Manual of Safavid Administration, by Mirza Naqi Nasiri. Mage Publishers. ISBN 978-1933823232.
