= Sakasene =

Historical region on the territory of modern Azerbaijan

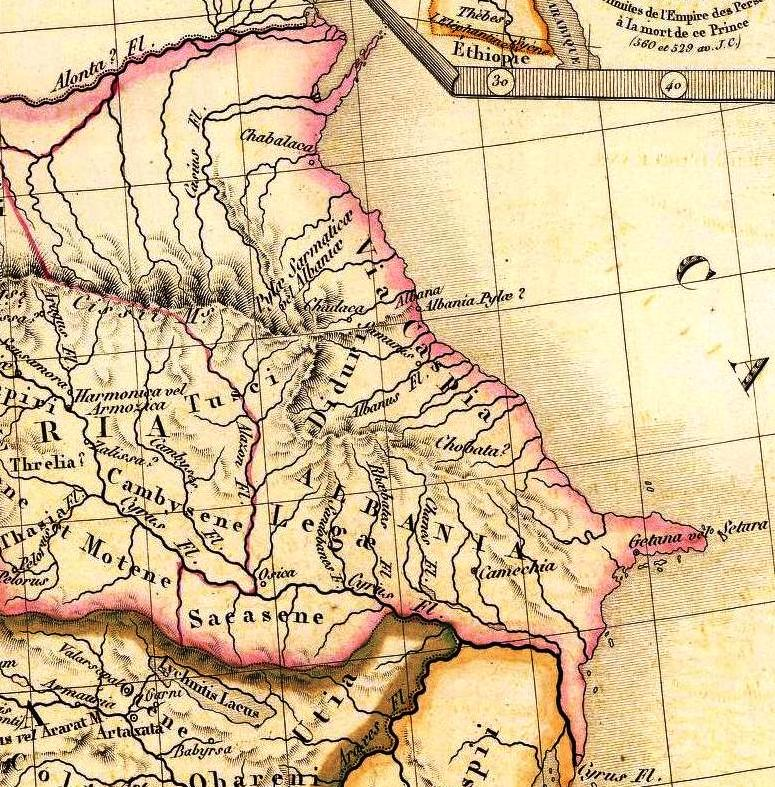
Sakasene

Sakasena (Armenian: Շակաշեն - Shakashen, Greek: Σακασηνήν - Sakasena; from Persian Saka-anaayana - "inhabited territory of the Saks") is a historical region on the territory of modern Azerbaijan. The former core of the 7th - 6th century BCE of the Scythian kingdom of Ishkuz. It got its name from the tribes of the Scythians (Saks in the Eastern tradition), who later entered the tribal union of the Caucasian Albanians. At the end of the 6th - beginning of the 5th century BCE it was part of the satrapy Media under the Achaemenid Empire. At the beginning of the 2nd century BCE it was annexed to Greater Armenia, becoming the Gavar (district) of the Nahanga (province) of Utic. In the division of Great Armenia in 387, it went to the Caucasian Albania, which was, under the treaty, subordinate to the Sassanids. It was located South of the middle course of the Kura, in the area of modern Ganja.

== Description ==
It is assumed that "Sakasena" was the official Median name for the core of the former territory of the Scythian kingdom, located at the beginning of the 7th century BCE North of the state of Manna, in the Araks valley, and possibly further North.

It got its name from the Scythian tribes (Sakas in the Eastern tradition).

== History ==
Some of the first mentions of the Iranian-speaking tribes of the Scythians in Assyrian sources date back to the reign of the Assyrian king Esarhaddon (680-669 BCE). During this period, the Scythians acted as allies of Manna against Assyria. The Scythians actively participated in the political life of Western Asia throughout the 7th century BCE. In 612 BCE, together with the Babylonians and the Medes, they participated in the siege and capture of Nineveh, the second capital of Assyria.

Territories with a Scythian population, from the end of the 6th-beginning of the 5th centuries BCE, were part of the Median satrapy, whose population was made up of the Medes, Parikania and Orthocoribantia. The term orthokoribantia is a translation of the ancient Persian term tigraχauda - "sharp-capped". The position of the Scythian kingdom, as well as Urartu and Manna, dependent on Media, is confirmed in the "Book of Jeremiah", an excerpt dated 593 BCE:

Raise banners all over the earth, blow the horn among the peoples, consecrate the nations to the war with Babylon, summon kingdoms against him - Ararat, Minnie, Ashkenaz - send a commander against him, gather horses like a cloud of locusts! For the war with Babylon, consecrate the nations, the kings of Media, her rulers and governors, all the land under their control.

During the reign of Darius I, this region was part of the satrapy that covered the northwestern regions of Persia. Describing the administrative divisions of Persia, Herodotus noted:

Ecbatana, the rest of Media, wigging and Orthocoribantia paid 450 talents. This is the tenth arrondissement

The Saki, along with the Albanians, were in the Persian army that fought against the Macedonians at Gaugamela. Description of these events was preserved by Arrian, on the basis of official diaries, describing the campaigns of Alexander the Great:

The Medes were commanded by Atropat; with the Medes, there were the Qadusis, Albanians and Sakesins.

There is reason to believe that the Saks, along with the Albanians, were the largest tribal union.

Based on Strabo’s reports, the location of the Scythian kingdom, as well as the Sakasens, are located very accurately - south of the middle course of the Kura, in the area of modern Ganja.

In the 2nd century BCE, by the Armenian king Artashes I, a number of neighboring regions were annexed to Armenia, including the right bank of the Kura, where the Albanians, Utii and Saki lived. Sakasena became one of the regions of Greater Armenia, a gavar (district) of the Utik province. During the division of Great Armenia in 387, it ceded to the vassal of Persia Caucasian Albania.

According to the ancient geographer Strabo, Sakasena was a region of Armenia. Strabo in the 1st century CE reports:

The Saki raided like the Cimmerians and Trers; some raids were long-distance, others - at close range. So they captured Bactriana and took possession of the best land in Armenia, to which they left the name in their own name - Sakasena.

Rushing through Albania to Armenia, the Saks settled on the right bank of the Kura River, in the fertile valleys, leaving the region with the name Shakashen.

Sacasena is mentioned by Claudius Ptolemy (1st century CE):

The regions of Armenia, in the part that lies between the rivers Euphrates, Cyrus and Araks, are as follows: near the Moschian mountains - Kotarzenskaya, above the so-called Bochs; along the Kira river - Tosarenskaya and Otenskaya; along the Araks river - Koltenskaya and below it Soduenskaya; near the mountain Pariadra - Siraken and Sakasena ...

Apparently, the population of the region was the descendants of these Iranian-speaking nomads. The descendants of the Scythian tribes that settled in the fertile valleys along the banks of the Kura: on the right bank, in the Sakasen region, and on the left bank in the foothills of the Caucasus, in the Sheki region, were among the tribes that formed the Albanian union. Shakashen was part of Great Armenia almost until the end of its existence. At the end of the IV century, the Sassanids help the king of Caucasian Albania Urnayr to seize the Utik region from the Armenians (with Khalkhal, Gardman, Shakashen, Kolt and Artsakh, but a few years later they were repulsed by the Armenians under the leadership of Mushegh Mamikonyan, but not for long. regions, Shakashen, Artsakh, Utik and Paytakaran, were reunited with Albania at the end of the 4th century In the middle of the 7th century, the Arabs invade Albanian territory and the eastern Caucasus, where they capture Paytakaran, Barda, Shirvan, Derbent, Shakashen, Kabala and Shabran, after which Arran, together with Iberia and Armenia was united into one province of the Arab Caliphate headed by the Arab governor.

== Sources ==
1. И. М. Дьяконов. История Мидии от древнейших времен до конца IV в. до н. э.
2. А. П. Новосельцев. К вопросу о политической границе Армении и Кавказской Албании в античный период. Здесь некогда поселились пришедшие в Закавказье племена иранцев-саков, от которых область и получила свое название
3. Советская историческая энциклопедия. Наименование получила от осевших в Закавказье сакасенов, считавшихся потомками саков или скифов. Они входили в алб. союз племен. В 1-й пол. 2 в. до н. э. С. была присоединена к Вел. Армении, а после 387 н. э. — вновь к Албании Кавказской.
4. Тревер К.В. Очерки по истории и культуре Кавказской Албании. — М.-Л.: Издательство Академии Наук СССР, 1959.Среди племен, образовавших Албанский союз, были и какие-то потомки скифских или сакских племен, быть может, из числа тех, которые некогда, устремляясь через Албанию в Армению, осели в плодородных долинах по берегам Куры: на правом ее берегу — это область Шакашен (Сакасена), выше впадения в Куру слева Поры и Алазани (северо-западнее области Отены—Утик), а на левобережье — район Шаке, выше Кабалаки, в предгорьях Кавказа.
5. нца IV в. до н. э. У нас есть данные, что в конце VI — начале V в. до н. э. территория со скифским населением входила в состав сатрапии Мидии: по Геродоту, в этой сатрапии жили мидяне, парикании и ортокорибантии.Несомненно, однако, что «Царство скифов» следует искать в непосредственной близости от Мидии и особенно от Манны.… Во всяком случае мы в полном праве считать, что скифы-шкуда под названием ортокорибантиев еще в конце VI—V в. жили в пределах тогдашней сатрапии Мидии. Можно попытаться и более точно установить место их обитания. Мы уже указывали, что, по Геродоту, скифы сразились с мидянами, миновав Большой Кавказ, то есть на территории нынешнего Советского Азербайджана. Так как это произошло, как мы увидим, лишь в 50-х годах VII в., то очевидно, что до этого времени скифы-шкуда здесь именно и жили.
6. Всемирная история. Энциклопедия. Том 3, гл. VIII:
7. Б. Б. Пиотровский. Ванское царство (Урарту)
8. «Книга Иеремии» 51:27, 51:28
9. В. В. Латышев. Известия древних писателей о Скифии и Кавказе."Вестник Древней Истории" в № 1—4 1947 г.
10. Геродот «История», Книга III «Талия»
11. Тревер К.В. Очерки по истории и культуре Кавказской Албании. — М.-Л.: Издательство Академии Наук СССР, 1959
12. Страбон. География, XI, 8,4
13. Chaumont, M. L. Albania
14. Фавстос Бузанд. История Армении, V,13
15. ASSYRIA
16. ALBANIA
