= Mushegh =

Mushegh, Moushegh or Mušeł (in Armenian Մուշեղ) is an Armenian masculine given name. Notable people with the name include:

- Moushegh Ishkhan (1914-1990), Armenian Diasporan poet, writer and educator
- Mushegh Mamikonian (disambiguation), several nobles of the Mamikonian family
- Mushegh Sarvarian, also known as Mushegh Soruri (1910-1981), Iranian film director
