= Artavasdes I of Media Atropatene =

Artavasdes I
- King
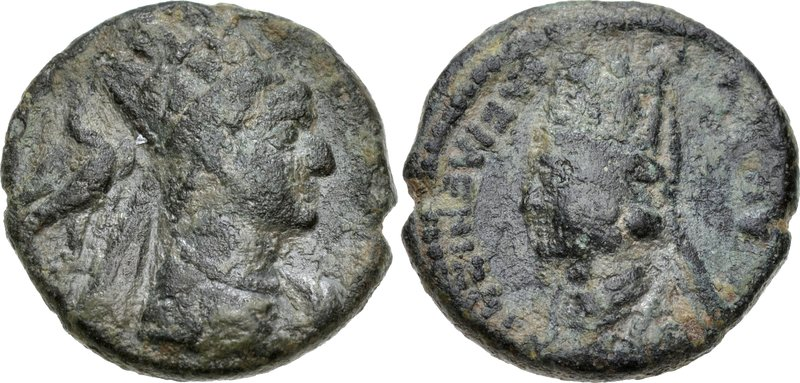
- Coin of Artavasdes I
- Reign: Media Atropatene 56 BC–30 BC, Lesser Armenia 30 BC–20 BC
- Predecessor: Ariobarzanes I
- Successor: Asinnalus
- Born: c. 59 BC
- Died: c. 20 BC (aged 39); Rome
- Issue: Iotapa; Ariobarzanes II; Darius II
- Father: Ariobarzanes I

Artavasdes I of Media Atropatene, also known as Artavasdes I of Atropatene (before or about 59 BC – about 20 BC) and Artabazus, was a prince who served as a king of Media Atropatene. Artavasdes I was an enemy of King Artavasdes II of Armenia and his son Artaxias II. He was a contemporary of the Ptolemaic Greek Queen Cleopatra VII and Roman Triumvir Mark Antony, as Artavasdes I was mentioned in their diplomatic affairs.

== Family background and early life ==
Artavasdes I was of Median and possibly of Armenian, Greek descent. He was the child born to Ariobarzanes I by an unnamed wife. His probable paternal uncle could have been Darius I. He was born and raised in the Kingdom of Media Atropatene. Artavasdes I is the namesake of his ancestor Artabazanes, a previous ruling king of Media Atropatene in the 3rd century BC, as the name Artavasdes is a variation of the name Artabazanes (see Asha).

According to modern genealogies the father of Artavasdes I, Ariobarzanes I, was a son of a previous ruling king, Mithridates I of Media Atropatene, and his wife, an unnamed Armenian princess from the Artaxiad dynasty who was a daughter of the Armenian king Tigranes the Great and his wife, Cleopatra of Pontus, which can explain the claims of Mithridates I's descendants to the Armenian kingship in opposition to the lasting ruling monarchs of the Artaxiad dynasty. Another possibility in linking Artavasdes I to the marriage of Mithridates I and his wife is through his name. The name Artavasdes bears a typical Armenian royal name and therefore, in all likelihood, Artavasdes I is a descendant of this marriage.

== Reign as king ==
Artavasdes I succeeded his father as king, when Ariobarzanes I died in 56 BC. When Mark Antony led his campaign against the Parthian Empire in 36 BC, Artavasdes I was an ally of the King Phraates IV of Parthia. Antony led his troops from Zeugma northward into Armenia and then invaded the domain of Artavasdes I. Antony did not want to attack Parthia from the west, which was the shortest way, but surprisingly from the north. Antony allegedly used this strategy on the advice of Artavasdes II of Armenia, the enemy of Artavasdes I. Antony moved with his army in fast marches to Phraaspa, the strong fortified capital of Media Atropatene, where Artavasdes I had got his family to safety. Meantime Artavasdes I had joined the army of Phraates IV.

Antony was not able to take Phraaspa and besieged the city, but Artavasdes I and the Parthian commander Monaeses destroyed two legions of Antony's general, Oppius Statianus, who had slowly followed with the siege machines of Antony's troops. Antony could not capture Phraaspa without these machines. Therefore, he had to withdraw to Armenia and Parthia was not invaded.

So Artavasdes I had maintained his ground against the Romans but his domain had been severely ravaged. Besides his stronger ally Phraates IV treated him condescending and gave him only a little booty and was near depriving him of his dominion. Therefore, in 35 BC Artavasdes I offered Antony an alliance against Parthia, and Antony gladly accepted. To deepen this friendship Alexander Helios, the son of Antony and Cleopatra VII, was betrothed to Artavasdes I's daughter Iotapa, although both were infants in 34 BC.

In 33 BC Antony met his coalition partner on the river Araxes; they agreed that Antony should support Artavasdes I against Parthia and that the Median king should help Antony against Octavian. They interchanged parts of their troops. The domain of Artavasdes I was enlarged with parts of Armenia. Antony had returned a standard that the Median king had taken from Oppius Statianus in 36 BC, and also took Iotapa along with him. With the help of the Roman reinforcements Artavasdes I was initially able to repulse the Parthian attack. Before the Battle of Actium, Antony called back his Roman troops without sending back the Median reinforcements. This time Artaxias II defeated Artavasdes I who was captured in 30 BC.

During Artavasdes' imprisonment, a civil war between the Parthians later took place, which gave him the opportunity to escape prison. He took refuge with Augustus, who received him with friendliness, gave him back his daughter Iotapa and made him a client king of Lesser Armenia. He died around 20 BC probably in Rome. Artavasdes I was succeeded in the kingship of Media Atropatene by Asinnalus.

== Issue ==
- Daughter, Iotapa was engaged to the Ptolemaic Greek Prince Alexander Helios who later married her maternal cousin, Mithridates III of Commagene
- Son, Ariobarzanes II
- Son, Darius II. He married an unnamed Parthian Arsacid princess, by whom they had two sons: the Parthian Kings Artabanus II and Vonones II.

== Inscription evidence ==
In Rome, two epitaph inscriptions have been found bearing the name of an Artavasdes. The epitaphs are probably of the son and the grandson of a Median Atropatenian king called Ariobarzanes. However it is uncertain, if the Ariobarzanes refers to Ariobarzanes I or his grandson Ariobarzanes II. Artavasdes I is mentioned in paragraphs 27 and 33 of the Res Gestae Divi Augusti.

== Sources ==
- Res Gestae Divi Augusti, 1st century
- U. Wilcken, Artavasdes 2. article in Realencyclopädie der Classischen Altertumswissenschaft, vol. II 1 col. 1309–1311, 1895
- Toumanoff, Cyril (1976). Manuel de Généalogie et de Chronologie pour l'Histoire de la Caucasie Chrétienne (Arménie-Géorgie-Albanie) (in French). Rome: Edizioni Aquila. OCLC 4780662.
- S. Baldwin, Comments on "Iberian route" DFA line, web, 1996
- H. Werner, Ägypten in hellenistischer Zeit (Egypt in Hellenistic times), Munich, 2001
- P.M. Swan, The Augustan Succession: An Historical Commentary on Cassius Dio's Roman History, Books 55–56 (9 B.C.-A.D. 14) (Google eBook), Oxford University Press, 2004
- Contents from Catalan, French and German Wikipedia
- Encyclopaedia Iranica – Artavasdes
- Settipani on Baldwin on the Commagenian DFA Link Part 2 of 3
- Azerbaijan iii. Pre-Islamic History, Atropates, Persian satrap of Media, made himself independent in 321 B.C. Thereafter Greek and Latin writers named the territory as Media Atropatene or, less frequently, Media Minor: Parthian period
