= Ariobarzanes II of Atropatene =

King of Armenia from 2 to 4 AD

Ariobarzanes II

King of Armenia
- Reign: 2 AD – 4 AD
- Predecessor: Erato (as sole monarch in 1–2 AD); Tigranes IV (as king until 1 AD)
- Successor: Artavasdes IV
- Died: 4 AD
- Father: Artavasdes I
- Religion: Zoroastrianism

Ariobarzanes II of Atropatene also known as Ariobarzanes of Media; Ariobarzanes of Armenia; Ariobarzanes II; Ariobarzanes II of Media Atropatene and Ariobarzanes (40 BC – June 26, 4 AD) was king of Media Atropatene who ruled sometime from 28 BC to 20 BC until 4 and was appointed by the Roman emperor Augustus to serve as a Roman client king of Armenia from 2 AD until 4.

== Family background and early life ==
Ariobarzanes II was a monarch of Media, of Armenian and Greek descent. He was the first son and among the children born to Artavasdes I and Athenais. Ariobarzanes II was the namesake of his paternal grandfather Ariobarzanes I, a previous king of Media Atropatene. He is also the namesake of his Pontian ancestors who governed with this name and of his mother's maternal grandfather, uncle and cousin who ruled with this name as kings of Cappadocia. He was born and raised in Media Atropatene.

== Kingship of Media Atropatene and Armenia ==
At an unknown date in the 20 BCs, Ariobarzanes II succeeded his relative Asinnalus as king of Media Atropatene and little is known on his reign.

The Armenian monarchs of the Artaxiad dynasty, Tigranes IV and Erato, instigated war with the aid of King Phraates V of Parthia. To avoid a full-scale war with Rome, Phraates V soon ceased his support to the Armenian monarchs. After Tigranes IV was killed in battle, Erato abdicated. Augustus appointed Ariobarzanes II in 2 BC. Ariobarzanes II through his father was a distant relative of the Artaxiad dynasty as he was a descendant of a sister of King Artavasdes II of Armenia who married Mithridates I.

Ariobarzanes II served as a loyal Roman client king and was used as a key element in Augustus’ Asian policy. Ariobarzanes II ruled both Armenia and Media Atropatene. He accompanied Augustus’ grandson and adopted son Gaius Caesar to Armenia. When Gaius and Ariobarzanes II arrived in Armenia, the Armenians being fiery and proud, refused to acknowledge Ariobarzanes II as their new king, especially as he was a foreigner in their country. The Armenians revolted against Rome under the leadership of a local man named Addon.

Gaius with his Roman legions ended the revolt and reduced the city of Artagira. In Artagira, Gaius made Ariobarzanes II the new King of Armenia. Ariobarzanes II made Artagira his capital city when he ruled Armenia and Media Atropatene together. The Armenians eventually came to respect Ariobarzanes II as their king because of his noble personality, spirit and his physical beauty. By other sources, Armenians did not accept Ariobarzanes, who was pursuing a pro-Roman policy. It is supposed that he became a victim of a conspiracy organized by the Armenians. In 4, Ariobarzanes II died and was succeeded his son Artavasdes IV, who was also killed 2 years later.

== Family and issue ==
Ariobarzanes II had two sons:

- Artavasdes IV
- Gaius Julius Ariobarzanes I, who may have had a son called Gaius Julius Ariobarzanes II

== Inscription evidence ==
Ariobarzanes II is mentioned in paragraphs 27 and 33 of the Res Gestae Divi Augusti. In Rome, two Epitaph inscriptions have been found bearing the name of an Artavasdes. The epitaphs are probably of the son and the grandson of a Median Atropatenian king called Ariobarzanes. However it is uncertain if the Ariobarzanes refers to Ariobarzanes I or Ariobarzanes II.

== Sources ==
- Res Gestae Divi Augusti, 1st century
- P.M. Swan, The Augustan Succession: An Historical Commentary on Cassius Dio's Roman History, Books 55-56 (9 B.C.-A.D. 14) (Google eBook), Oxford University Press, 2004
- M. Bunsen, Encyclopedia of the Roman Empire, Infobase Printing, 2009
- Edited by Timothy Venning, A Chronology of the Roman Empire, Continuum International Publishing Group, 2011
- Azerbaijan iii. Pre-Islamic History, Atropates, Persian satrap of Media, made himself independent in 321 B.C. Thereafter Greek and Latin writers named the territory as Media Atropatene or, less frequently, Media Minor: Parthian period
- Ptolemaic Genealogy: Affiliated Lines, Descendant Lines
- A. Melqonyan, H. Avetisyan, History of Armenia, textbook. 2014. Paragraph: Armenia on the stage of competition between Rome and Parthia.

Regnal titles
Preceded by Artavasdes I	King of Atropatene; 28/20 BC – 4 AD	Succeeded by Artavasdes III
Preceded by Tigranes IV and Erato	King of Armenia; 2 AD – 4 AD	Succeeded by Artavasdes III
