= Mushegh Mamikonian =

Mushegh Mamikonian or Mušeł Mamikonian (Armenian: Մուշեղ Մամիկոնյան) can refer to one of the following members of the noble Armenian Mamikonian family:

- Mushegh I Mamikonian, sparapet and regent of Arsacid Armenia in the 370s
- Mushegh II Mamikonian, marzban of Persian Armenia in 591
- Mushegh III Mamikonian, killed fighting alongside the Persians at the Battle of Qadisiyya in 636
- Mushegh IV Mamikonian, sparapet of Armenia in the 650s
- Mushegh V Mamikonian, sparapet of Armenia in 706–709
- Mushegh VI Mamikonian, ishkhan of Armenia in 748–753, killed at the Battle of Bagrevand in 775
