= Mohammad-Ali Khan of Tabriz =

18th century Iranian official

Mohammad-Ali Khan of Tabriz (Persian: محمدعلی خان تبریز) was an early 18th-century Safavid official, who served as the governor (beglarbeg) of Azerbaijan from 1719 to 1720. Described as a despotic governor by contemporaneous sources, Mohammad-Ali Khan served during the chaotic years in which the Safavid state was crumbling and in a state of heavy decline. In early 1719, he was forced to flee following an uprising by the people of his province. After the event, the Iranian government at Isfahan is said to have responded by imposing a heavy fine on Tabriz (the provincial capital) and by ordering the inhabitants to obey the local authorities.

== Sources ==
- Floor, Willem M. (2008). Titles and Emoluments in Safavid Iran: A Third Manual of Safavid Administration, by Mirza Naqi Nasiri. Washington, DC: Mage Publishers. p. 156. ISBN 978-1933823232.
- Matthee, Rudi (2012). Persia in Crisis: Safavid Decline and the Fall of Isfahan. I.B.Tauris. p. 223. ISBN 978-1845117450.

Preceded by Safiqoli Khan Ziyadoghlu Qajar (aka Aliqoli Khan)	Governor of Azerbaijan; 1719-1720	Succeeded by Mikhri (Mehdi?) Khan
