= Asinnalus of Media Atropatene =

Prince who served as a King of Media Atropatene

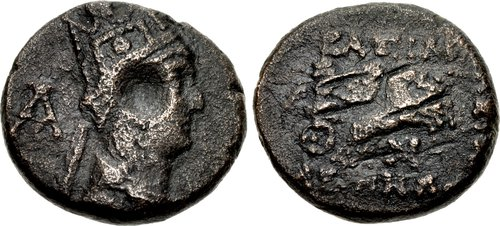
Coin of Asinnalus

Asinnalus of Media Atropatene (flourished 1st century BC) was a Prince who served as a King of Media Atropatene.

Little is known on the origins and life of Asinnalus. He was a monarch of Median and possibly of Armenian, Greek descent. He succeeded his relative Artavasdes I in the Kingship of Media Atropatene in 30 BC. As in that year the Roman Triumvir Octavian, gave Artavasdes I the Kingdom of Sophene to govern as a Roman Client King.

Asinnalus ruled as King of Media Atropatene from 30 BC to an unknown date in the 20s BC. He is only known from surviving numismatic evidence. He appeared to have died at an unknown date in the 20s BC, as he was succeeded by Ariobarzanes II, one of the sons of Artavasdes I.

== Sources and External links ==
- Coinage of Asinnalus at Classical Numismatic Group
- Coinage of Asinnalus at Classical Numismatic Group
- P.M. Swan, The Augustan Succession: An Historical Commentary on Cassius Dio’s Roman History, Books 55-56 (9 B.C.-A.D. 14) (Google eBook), Oxford University Press, 2004
