= Ariobarzanes I of Media Atropatene =

King of Media

Ariobarzanes I of Media Atropatene, also known as Ariobarzanes I of Media, Ariobarzanes of Atropatene, Ariobarzanes I and Ariobarzanes (flourished 1st century BC, ruled from 65 BC until 56 BC) was king of Media Atropatene.

Ariobarzanes I was a monarch of Median and possibly of Armenian, Greek descent. According to modern genealogies, Ariobarzanes I was a son of a previous ruling King Mithridates I and a daughter of the Armenian King Tigranes the Great and his wife, Cleopatra of Pontus, which can explain the claims of Mithridates I’s descendants to the Armenian kingship in opposition to the lasting ruling monarchs of the Artaxiad dynasty. Another possibility in linking Ariobarzanes I as a son born to Mithridates I and his wife is through his name. The name Ariobarzanes is a name of Iranian origin. There were Persian satraps who bore this name as did some of the ancestors of Cleopatra, daughter of King Mithridates VI of Pontus and his sister-wife Laodice.

Little is known on the life of Ariobarzanes I. Ariobarzanes I appeared to have succeeded Darius I as king of Media Atropatene in 65 BC, whom appeared to have a short reign. Ariobarzanes I and Darius I were related as they may have been brothers. Although Ariobarzanes I ruled from 65 BC til 56 BC, his reign in the time-scale would appear to preclude the short reign of Darius I and shows that he came to the throne sometime before 59 BC.

Little is known on the reign of Ariobarzanes I. He appeared to have died in 56 BC, as he was succeeded by his son Artavasdes I of Media Atropatene. His son from an unnamed wife, was born before 59 BC.

In Rome, two Epitaph inscriptions have been found bearing the name of Artavasdes. The Epitaphs are probably of the son and the grandson of a Median Atropatenian king called Ariobarzanes. However it is uncertain, if the Ariobarzanes refers to Ariobarzanes I or his grandson Ariobarzanes II. Ariobarzanes I is mentioned in paragraph 33 of the Res Gestae Divi Augusti.

== Sources ==
- Res Gestae Divi Augusti, 1st century
- Toumanoff, Cyril (1976). Manuel de Généalogie et de Chronologie pour l'Histoire de la Caucasie Chrétienne (Arménie-Géorgie-Albanie) (in French). Rome: Edizioni Aquila. OCLC 4780662.
- A. Mayor, The Poison King: the life and legend of Mithradates, Rome’s deadliest enemy, Princeton University Press, 2009
- Commagene Genealogy Notes at Rootsweb
- Settipani on Baldwin on the Commagenian DFA Link Part 2 of 3
- Encyclopaedia Iranica – Ariobarzanes
- Encyclopaedia Iranica - Artavasdes
- Azerbaijan iii. Pre-Islamic History, Atropates, Persian satrap of Media, made himself independent in 321 B.C. Thereafter Greek and Latin writers named the territory as Media Atropatene or, less frequently, Media Minor: Parthian period
