= Pietro Bizzarri =

Italian historian and spy

Pietro Bizzarri (1525–1586) was an Italian historian and spy.

== Life ==
Bizzarri was born at Sassoferrato in Umbria; or, according to some writers, at Perugia, and so is sometimes called Petrus Perusius. When young he went to Venice, but having become a Protestant he left for Germany, in 1545. After the Battle of Mühlberg (1547) he moved on to England, where he spent periods his life.

On 4 July 1549 Bizzarri was admitted a Fellow of St John's College, Cambridge, by the royal commissioners for the visitation of the university, being incorporated there ad eundem; and Francis Russell became his patron. The accession of Queen Mary saw him leave England; he returned on the accession of Elizabeth I.

Bishop John Jewel, prompted by Archbishop Matthew Parker, gave Bizzari the prebend of Alton Pancras in Salisbury Cathedral. This followed the presentation to the queen of his De principe tractatus. Meanwhile Russell had become governor of Berwick. Bizzarri went north with him. He presented Mary, Queen of Scots with a different treatise, and shortly went abroad.

Not receiving further church preferment, Bizzarri began to travel. He obtained, in 1570, a license from William Cecil to go abroad, to print his own works, and gather news of foreign affairs for the government. He passed some time at Genoa; in Germany he obtained, through the influence of Hubert Languet, employment with the Elector of Saxony. On 20 October 1573 he addressed from Augsburg a letter in Italian to Cecil, now Lord Burghley. He went on to Antwerp, where he met the scholarly circle around Christopher Plantin. In 1581 he asked Justus Lipsius in Leyden to find a publisher of his "Universal History" in eight volumes. He was back in Antwerp in December 1583; on 23 November 1586 he addressed a Latin letter from The Hague to Burghley.

Bizzari is thought to have died soon after November 1586.

== Works ==
Bizzarri's works are:

- Varia Opuscula, Venice (Aldus), 1565. Dedicated to Queen Elizabeth. This work is divided into two parts, the first of declamations in the manner of the ancient rhetoricians, the second of poems, some of which are reprinted in Gherus's Delitiæ 200 Italorum Poetarum, and in Carmina illustrium Poetarum Italicorum. Jeremiah Holmes Wiffen, in his memoirs of the house of Russell, gave English metrical versions of two short poems addressed to members of that family.
- Historia della guerra fatta in Ungheria dall' inuittissimo Imperatore de' Christiani, contra quello de' Turchi: con la Narratione di tutte quelle cose che sono auuenute in Europa, dall' anno 1564, insino all' anno 1568, Lyon, 1568, and, with a slightly different title, 1569. A Latin translation by the author himself was printed as Pannonicum Bellum, sub Maximiliano II Rom. et Solymano Turcarum Imperatoribus gestum: cumque Arcis Sigethi expugnatione, iam pridem magna cura et studio descriptum. Vnà cum Epitome illarum rerum quæ in Europa insigniores gestae sunt: et præsertim de Belgarum motibus, ab anno LXIIII usque ad LXXIII, Basle, 1573. The first treatise in this volume was included by Jacques Bongars in his Rerum Hungaricarum Scriptores varii, Frankfort, 1600, and by Matthew Bell in his reprint, Vienna, 1746.
- Cyprium Bellum inter Venetos et Selymum, Turcarum imperatorem, gestum, Basle, 1573. A French translation appeared as Histoire de la Guerre qui s'est passée entre les Venitiens et la saincte Ligue contre les Turcs, pour l'Isle de Cypre, ès années 1570, 1571, & 1572, mise en Francoys par F. de Belleforest, Paris, 1573.
- Senatus Populiq. Geneuensis Rerum domi, forisque, gestarum Historiæ atque Annales: cum luculenta variarum rerum cognitione dignissimarum, quæ diversis temporibus, & potissimùm hac nostra tempestate contigerunt, enarratione, Antwerp, 1579. Grævius printed two pieces from this work in the first volume of his Thesaurus Antiquitat. Italicar.
- Rerum Persicarum historia, initia gentis, resque gestas ad hæc usque tempora complectens: accedunt varia opuscula diversorum scriptorum ad historiam Persicam recentiorem spectantia, Antwerp, 1583; Frankfort, 1601. The Frankfort edition contains some opuscula not to be found in the other.
- "Universal History", manuscript in 8 vols.
- De Principe tractatus; ad reginam Elizabetham, Royal manuscripts, British Library 12 a, 48. This differs slightly from the printed treatise "De optimo principe" in the Varia Opuscula. The dedication of the manuscript is dated 5 December 1561.

Bizzarri also brought out a new edition of La Santa Comedia of Mario Cardoini, Venice, 1566.
