= Darius I of Media Atropatene =

King of Media Atropatane (died 65 BC)

Darius I
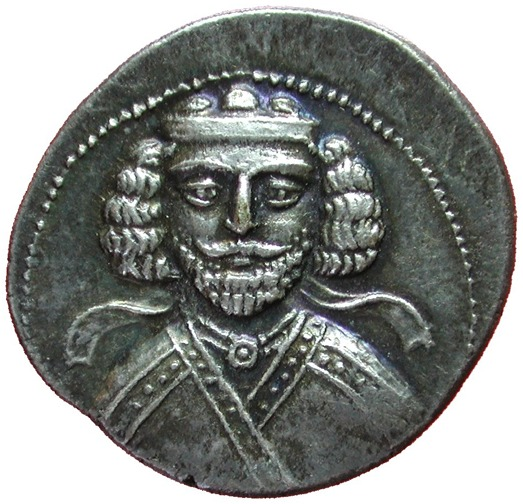
- Coin of Darius I of Media Atropatene

King of Media Atropatene
- Reign: c. 85 – c. 65 BC
- Predecessor: Mithridates I
- Successor: Ariobarzanes I
- Died: c. 65 BC
- Religion: Zoroastrianism

Darius I of Media Atropatene, also known as Darius I or Darius (c. 85 BC – c. 65 BC), was an Iranian prince who served as a king of Media Atropatene in c. 65 BC. Little is known of the life of Darius I, however he appeared to have succeeded his relative, Mithridates, who served as King of Media Atropatene one year earlier.

Darius I was known during his kingship to have been attacked by the Roman general Pompey with his army. However, the circumstances that led Pompey to attack Media Atropatene are unknown. Sometime in 65 BC, Darius I appeared to have died. His relative, Ariobarzanes I succeeded him as King of Media Atropatene.

== Sources ==
- Schippmann, K. (1987). "Azerbaijan iii. Pre-Islamic History". In Yarshater, Ehsan (ed.). Encyclopædia Iranica. Vol. III/2: Awāʾel al-maqālāt–Azerbaijan IV. London and New York: Routledge & Kegan Paul. pp. 221–224. ISBN 978-0-71009-114-7.

Preceded by Mithridates I	King of Media Atropatene c. 85 – c. 65 BC	Succeeded by Ariobarzanes I
