= Mithridates I of Media Atropatene =

King of Media

Mithridates I of Media Atropatene, sometimes known as Mithridates I and Mithridates of Media (100 BC – 66 BC) was a king of Media Atropatene.

Although Mithridates I was a Median prince, little is known on his lineage and his life. In or before 67 BC, Mithridates I married an unnamed Armenian princess from the Artaxiad dynasty who was a daughter of the Armenian king Tigranes the Great and, possibly, his wife, Cleopatra of Pontus.

Mithridates I ruled from 67 to c. 66 BC. Mithridates I is mentioned by Cassius Dio in the last campaign against the Roman general Lucullus in 67 BC. He was supporting Tigranes, when his father-in-law went to war against the Romans to invade Cappadocia in 67 BC. There is a possibility that Mithridates I was present with Tigranes the Great and King Mithridates VI of Pontus, when Tigranes and Mithridates VI were defeated by Lucullus at the Arsanias River in 66 BC.

Mithridates I appeared to have died in c. 66 BC, as his relative Darius I was King of Media Atropatene in c. 65 BC. According to modern genealogies, Mithridates I and his Armenian wife are presented in being the parents of a child, a son called Ariobarzanes I which can explain the claims of Mithridates I's descendants to the Armenian kingship in opposition to the lasting ruling monarchs of the Artaxiad dynasty.

== Sources ==
- Toumanoff, Cyril (1976). Manuel de Généalogie et de Chronologie pour l'Histoire de la Caucasie Chrétienne (Arménie-Géorgie-Albanie) (in French). Rome: Edizioni Aquila. OCLC 4780662.
- Ancient Library article on Mithridates
- Ptolemaic Genealogy: Tryphaena
- Azerbaijan iii. Pre-Islamic History, Atropates, Persian satrap of Media, made himself independent in 321 B.C. Thereafter Greek and Latin writers named the territory as Media Atropatene or, less frequently, Media Minor: Parthian period
