= Artabazanes =

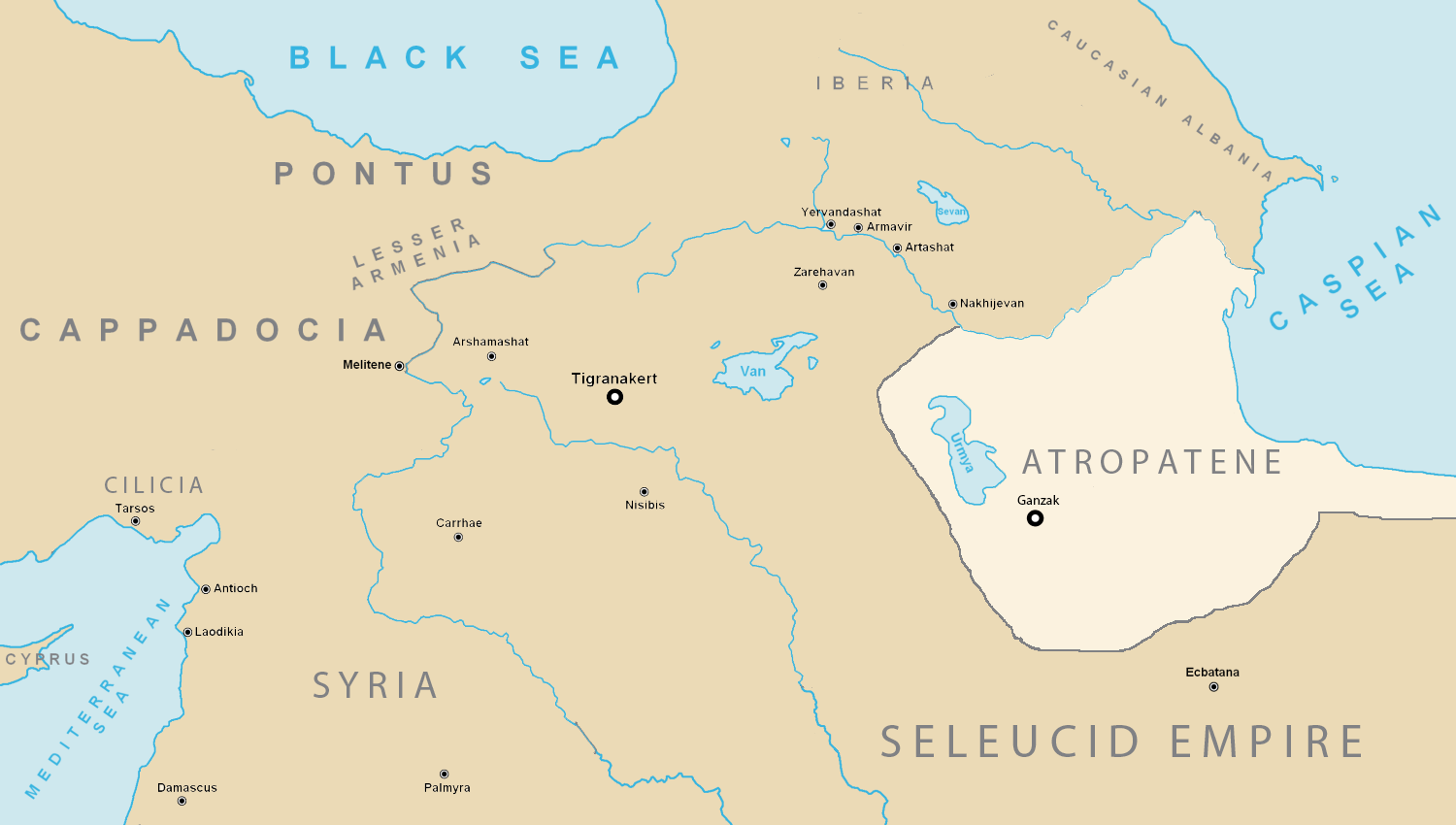
Artabazanes ruled in Media Atropatene.

Artabazanes of Media Atropatene (Old Persian: *R̥tabr̥zaⁿs, or *R̥tavazdānaʰ; Ancient Greek: Ἀρταβαζάνης Artabazánēs; flourished 3rd century BC) was a Prince and King of the Atropatene Kingdom. He ruled in 221 BC or 220 BC and was a contemporary of the Seleucid Greek King Antiochus III the Great.

He was presumably of Iranian lineage.
