= Roman Armenia =

Roman province (114 – 118)

Provincia Armenia
- Province of the Roman Empire
- 114–118
- Capital: Artashat
- Historical era: Classical antiquity
  - Established: 114
  - Disestablished: 118
Preceded by	Succeeded by
Kingdom of Armenia (antiquity)	Kingdom of Armenia (antiquity)
- Today part of: Armenia; Azerbaijan; Turkey; Georgia

Roman Armenia refers to the rule of parts of Greater Armenia by the Roman Empire from the 1st century AD to the end of Late Antiquity. While Armenia Minor had become a client state until it was incorporated into the Roman Empire proper during the 1st century AD, Greater Armenia remained an independent kingdom under the Arsacid dynasty. Throughout this period, Armenia remained a bone of contention between Rome and the Parthian Empire, as well as the Sasanian Empire that succeeded the latter, and the casus belli for several of the Roman–Persian Wars. Only in 114 would Emperor Trajan conquer and incorporate it as a short-lived Roman province.

In the late 4th century, Armenia was divided between Rome and the Sasanians, who took control of the larger part of the Armenian Kingdom and, in the mid-5th century, abolished the Armenian monarchy. In the 6th and the 7th centuries, Armenia once again became a battleground between the East Roman Empire (Byzantine) and the Sasanian Empire until both powers were defeated and replaced by the Muslim Caliphate in the mid-7th century.

== History ==
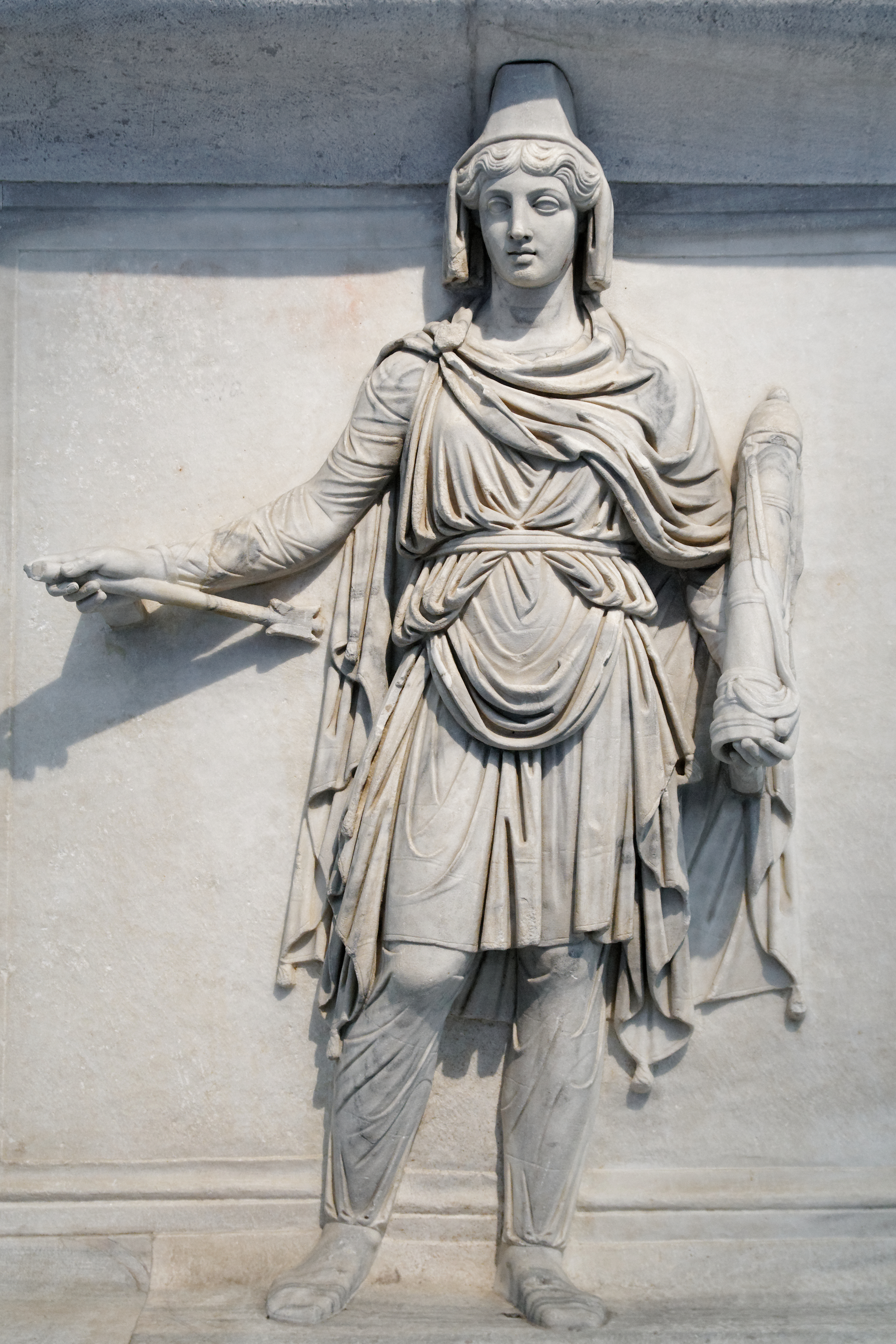
Statue of woman representing Armenia in Temple of Hadrian.

After the fall of the Artaxiad dynasty as a result of Pompey's campaign in Armenia in 66 BC, the Kingdom of Armenia was often contested between the Roman Empire and the Parthian Empire during the Roman–Parthian Wars. Throughout most of its history during this period, under the reign of the Arsacid dynasty, the Armenian nobility was divided among Roman-loyalists, Parthian-loyalists, and neutrals.

Armenia often served as a client state or vassal at the frontier of the two large empires and their successors, the Byzantine and Sassanid empires. During the Byzantine–Sasanian wars, Armenia was ultimately partitioned into Byzantine Armenia and Sasanian Armenia.

=== Struggle over influence with Parthia ===
The short-lived Roman province of Armenia in 117, north of Mesopotamia.

With the eastwards expansion of the Roman Republic during the Mithridatic Wars, the Kingdom of Armenia, under the Artaxiad dynasty, was made a Roman client kingdom by Pompey in 66–65 BC. For the next 100 years, Armenia remained under Roman influence. Towards the middle of the 1st century AD, the rising Parthian influence disputed Roman supremacy, which was re-established by the campaigns of Gnaeus Domitius Corbulo.

This conflict ended after the Battle of Rhandeia, in an effective stalemate and a formal compromise: a Parthian prince of the Arsacid line would henceforth sit on the Armenian throne, but his nomination had to be approved by the Roman emperor.

=== Roman province of Armenia (114–118 AD) ===
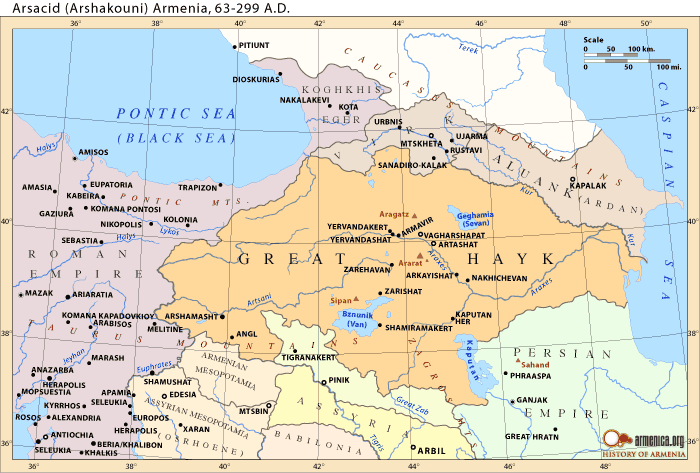
The Armenian Kingdom in 63–299 A.D., when it was a vassal of the Roman Empire

In 114, Emperor Trajan incorporated Armenia into the Empire, making it a full Roman province.

From Antioch the emperor (Trajan) marched to the Euphrates and farther northward as far as the most northerly legion-camp Satala in Lesser Armenia, whence he advanced into Armenia and took the direction of Artaxata ... Trajan was resolved to make this vassal-state a province, and a shift to eastern frontier of the (Roman) empire generally ... Armenia yielded to its fate and became a Roman governorship ... Trajan thereupon advanced and occupied Mesopotamia ... and, like Armenia, Mesopotamia became a Roman province.

In 113, Trajan invaded the Parthian Empire because he wanted to reinstate a vassal king in Armenia (a few years before fallen under Parthian control). In 114, Trajan from Antiochia in Syria marched on Armenia and conquered the capital Artaxata. Trajan then deposed the Armenian king Parthamasiris and ordered the annexation of Armenia to the Roman Empire as a new province.

The new province reached the shores of the Caspian Sea and bordered to the north with the Caucasian Iberia and Albania, two vassal states of Rome. As a Roman province Armenia was administered along with Cappadocia by Catilius Severus of the gens Claudia.

The Roman Senate issued coins on this occasion bearing the following inscription: ARMENIA ET MESOPOTAMIA IN POTESTATEM P.R. REDACTAE, thus solidifying Armenia's position as the newest Roman province. A rebellion by the Parthian pretender Sanatruces was put down, though sporadic resistance continued and Vologases III of Parthia managed to secure an area of south-eastern Armenia just before Trajan's death in August 117.

=== Roman protectorate ===
After Trajan's death, his successor Hadrian decided not to maintain the province of Armenia. In 118, Hadrian gave Armenia up, and installed Parthamaspates as its king. Parthamaspates was soon defeated by the Parthians, and again fled to the Romans, who granted him the co-rule of Osroene in western Greater Armenia as a consolation.

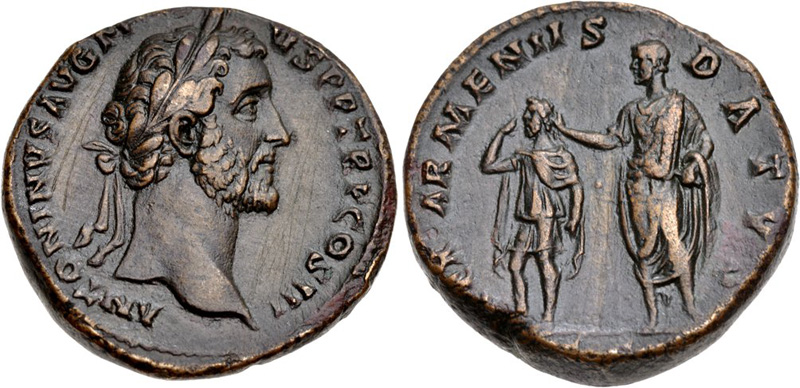
Roman coin of 141, showing emperor Antoninus Pius holding a crown on the Armenian King's head

Sohaemus was named king of Armenia by Roman emperor Antoninus Pius in 140. Just a few years later in 161, Armenia was lost again to Vologases IV of Parthia. In 163, a Roman counter-attack under Statius Priscus defeated the Parthians in Armenia and reinstalled Sohaemus as the Romans' favored candidate on the Armenian throne.

Armenia was in frequent dispute between the two empires and their candidates for the Armenian throne, a situation which lasted until the emergence of a new power, the Sasanians. Rome's power and influence increased over the years since, but Armenia retained its independence, even if only as a vassal state, although it was a Roman ally against the Sasanian Empire. When Roman emperor Septimius Severus sacked the Parthian capital of Ctesiphon, many Armenian soldiers were in his army. Later in the 4th century, they consisted of two Roman legions, the Legio I Armeniaca and the Legio II Armeniaca.

In the second half of the 3rd century, the Sassanid capital of Ctesiphon and areas of southern Armenia were sacked by the Romans under Emperor Carus, and all Armenia, after half a century of Persian rule, was ceded to Diocletian in 299 as a vassal territory.

=== Eastern Roman Armenia ===
In 363, a treaty was signed between the East Roman and Sassanid Persian empires, which divided Armenia between the two. The Persians retained the larger part of Armenia ("Persarmenia") while the Romans received a small part of Western Armenia.

Another treaty followed between 384 and 390, the Peace of Acilisene (usually dated c. 387), which established a definite line of division, running from a point just east of Karin (soon to be renamed Theodosiopolis) to another point southwest of Nisibis in Mesopotamia. The area under East Roman control thus increased, but still, about four fifths of the old Kingdom of Armenia remained under Persian rule.

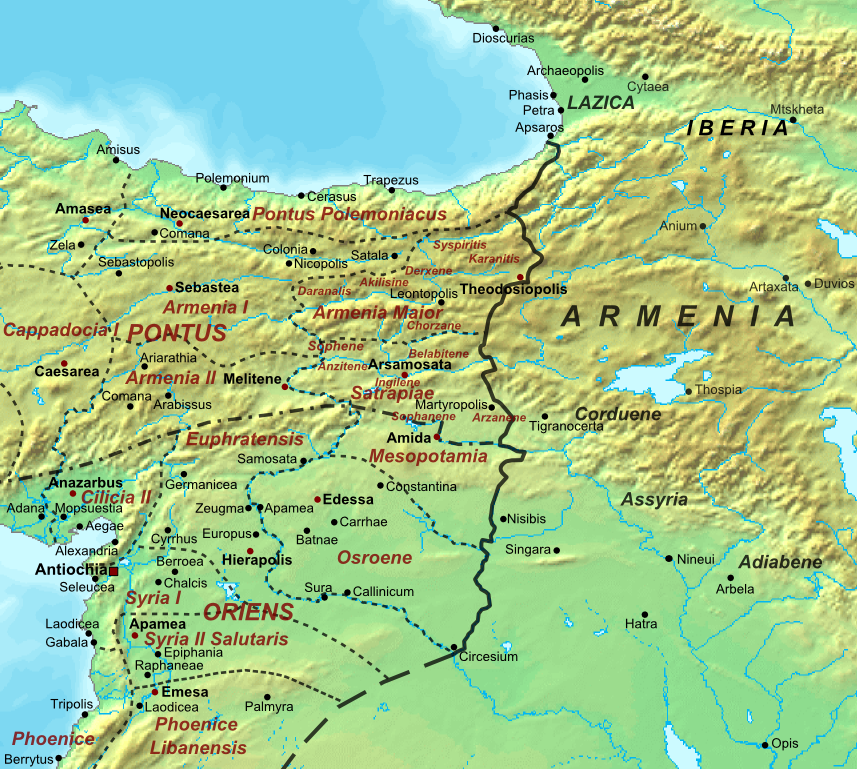
The Eastern Roman border after the treaty of Acilisene

Unlike Armenia Minor west of the Euphrates, which had been constituted into full provinces (Armenia I and Armenia II) under the Diocese of Pontus already in the time of Diocletian, the new territories retained a varying level of autonomy. Armenia Maior, the northern half, was constituted as a civitas stipendaria under a civil governor titled comes Armeniae, meaning that it retained internal autonomy, but was obliged to pay tribute and provide soldiers for the regular East Roman army.

Under Roman rule, Melitene was the base camp of Legio XII Fulminata. It was a major center in Armenia Minor (P'ok'r Hayk'), remaining so until the end of the 4th century. Emperor Theodosius I divided the region into two provinces: First Armenia (Hayk', Armenia Prima), with its capital at Sebasteia (modern Sivas); and Second Armenia (Armenia Secunda), with its capital at Melitene.

The satrapies in the south on the other hand, which had been under Roman influence already since 298, were a group of six fully autonomous principalities allied to the Empire (civitates foederatae): Ingilene, Sophene, Antzitene, Asthianene, Sophanene and Balabitene. The local Armenian nakharar were fully sovereign in their territories, and were merely required to provide soldiers upon request and to dispatch a golden crown to the emperor, as a token of submission. In return, they received their royal insignia, including red shoes, from the emperor.

The situation remained unchanged for near a century, until a large-scale revolt by the satraps in 485 against Emperor Zeno (r. 474–491). In its aftermath, the satraps were stripped of their sovereignty and their rights of hereditary succession, being in effect reduced to the status of tax-paying and imperially-administered civitates stipendariae.

Emperor Justinian I (r. 527–565) carried out a series of comprehensive administrative reforms. Already soon after his accession in 527, the dux Armeniae (responsible for Armenia Minor) and the comes Armeniae were abolished, and the military forces of the Armenian territories were subordinated to a new magister militum per Armeniam at Theodosiopolis.

In 536, new reforms were enacted that abolished the autonomy of the trans-Euphrates territories and formed four new regular provinces. Armenia Interior was joined with parts of Pontus Polemoniacus and Armenia I to form a new province, Armenia I Magna, the old Armenia I and Armenia II were re-divided into Armenia II and Armenia III, and the old Satrapies formed the new Armenia IV province. In 538, the Armenian nobles rose up against heavy taxation, but were defeated and forced to find refuge in Persia.

In 591, the treaty between Khosrow II and Maurice ceded most of Persarmenia to the Eastern Roman Empire.

=== Later history ===
The region was the focus of prolonged warfare in the Byzantine–Sasanian War of 602–628. After the onset of the Muslim conquests and the Arab conquest of Armenia, only the western parts of Armenia remained in Byzantine hands, forming part of the theme of Armeniakon. Armenia remained dominated by the Arabs thereafter, and was ruled by a succession of Caliphate-appointed emirs as well as local princes.

With the ebbing of the Caliphate's power and the fracturing of its outlying territories into autonomous statelets, the Byzantines were able to re-assert their influence over the Armenian principalities during the campaigns of John Kourkouas in the early 10th century. In the first half of the 11th century, under Basil II and his successors, most of Armenia came under direct Byzantine control, which lasted until the Battle of Manzikert in 1071, when all Armenia fell to the Seljuks.

Historians have also questioned the tendency to portray ancient Armenia primarily as a buffer or peripheral state between Rome and Iran. Giusto Traina has argued that Greater Armenia should instead be examined as an independent political actor with a significant strategic position and a role in the regional balance of power. He further advocates a “connected history” approach that considers Armenia within the wider political and cultural interactions of the Mediterranean and Eurasian worlds, while taking Armenian historiographical sources more fully into account.

== Episcopal sees ==
Ancient episcopal sees of the Roman province of Armenia III listed in the Annuario Pontificio as titular sees:

- Acilisene
- Camachus
- Citharizum
- Theodosiopolis in Armenia

For ancient episcopal sees in the Roman provinces of Armenia I and Armenia II, see Lesser Armenia#Episcopal sees.

== See also ==
- Legio I Armeniaca
- Legio II Armeniaca
- Sasanian Armenia
- Lesser Armenia
- Kingdom of Armenia (antiquity)
- Mamikonian
- Roman Georgia
- Byzantine Armenia
- Caucasian Albania

== Sources ==
- Garsoïan, Nina G. (1998). "Aρμενία μεγάλη καὶ ἐπαρχία Μεσοποταμίας". ΕΥΨΥΧΙΑ. Mélanges offerts à Hélène Ahrweiler (in French). Paris: Éditions de la Sorbonne. pp. 239–264. ISBN 9782859448301.
- Hovannisian, Richard G., ed. (2004), The Armenian People From Ancient to Modern Times, Volume I - The Dynastic Periods: From Antiquity to the Fourteenth Century, Palgrave Macmillan, ISBN 978-1-4039-6421-2
- Kazhdan, Alexander, ed. (1991), Oxford Dictionary of Byzantium, Oxford University Press, ISBN 978-0-19-504652-6
- Marciak, Michał (2017). Sophene, Gordyene, and Adiabene: Three Regna Minora of Northern Mesopotamia Between East and West. Brill.
- Migliorati, Guido. Cassio Dione e l'impero romano da Nerva ad Antonino Pio: alla luce dei nuovi documenti. Editore Vita e Pensiero. Roma, 2003 ISBN 88-343-1065-9
- Mommsen, Theodore. The provinces of the Roman Empire. Barnes & Noble Books. New York, 1996 ISBN 0-7607-0145-8
- Patterson, Lee E. (2015). "Antony and Armenia". TAPA. 145, No. 1 (Spring). The Johns Hopkins University Press: 77–105.
- Russell, J. R. (1986). "Armenia and Iran iii. Armenian Religion". In Yarshater, Ehsan (ed.). Encyclopædia Iranica (Online ed.). Encyclopædia Iranica Foundation.
