= Erus =

Erus may refer to:

- Ərus, a village in Azerbaijan
- Erus (bishop of Lugo) (fl. 924–941)

== See also ==
- Eru (disambiguation)
