= Tadım, Elazığ =

Village in Turkey

Tadım
- Village
- Location within Turkey
- Coordinates: 38°34′N 39°10′E
- Country: Turkey
- Province: Elazığ
- District: Elazığ
- Population (2021): 399
- Time zone: UTC+3 (TRT)

Tadım (Armenian: Դատեմ) is a village in the Elazığ District of Elazığ Province in Turkey. Its population is 399 (2021). Lying in the ancient province of Sophene, the village probably served as the capital of the Roman province of Fourth Armenia.

== Population ==
The village was formerly populated by Armenians and later settled by Yörüks and Turkmens.
