= Paluni =

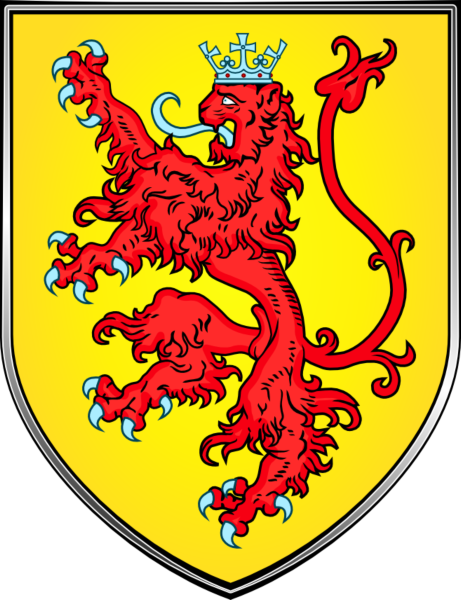

The House of Paluni was a dynastic house in Greater Armenia from the fourth to the sixth century AD.

The princes of Paluni occupied a remnant of the territorial dominion of the people of Lope or Puli, found in the Hittite annals, situated between Astyan and Taron, a domain that became named for them (the Balabitene occupied another remnant of that territory). The Paluni seem to have become part of the Mamikonian-ruled Taron, and then emigrated to Vaspurakan, which it named for itself. It disappeared soon after the start of the sixth century.

== See also ==
- List of regions of old Armenia

== Bibliography ==
- René Grousset, Histoire de l'Arménie des origines à 1071, Paris, Payot, 1947 (reimpr. 1973, 1984, 1995, 2008), 644 pages
