= Hashteank =

Historic canton of Armenia

Hashteank' (Հաշտեանք) was a historic canton of Armenia, in the province of Sophene. Called Asthianene (Greek: Ἀσθιανήνη) by the Greeks and Romans, it consisted of what is now the Bingöl plain, near the sources of the Tigris. The district of Khordzean (Greco-Roman Chorzene or Chorzanene), centered on Kiği (Armenian Kogoberd), was generally politically subordinate to Hashteank. Hashteank was primarily a rural district, with larger towns at Bingöl and Genç.

The Byzantine fortress of Citharizum, which was of great strength and was built by Justinian, was in the province.

== History ==
In 387, along with that of Balahovit the principality of Hashteank became a Byzantine vassal, extending the Byzantine sphere of influence eastward, with the new border with the Sasanian Empire being the hills east of the Bingöl plain.

In either 528 or 529, the military administration of Byzantine Armenia was reorganized. Under the new system, the fortress of Kitharizon (modern Bingöl) in Hashteank became the seat of one of the two "dukes" of Byzantine Armenia, with the other ruling from Martyropolis (Silvan in Sophene (both were subordinate to the magister militum ruling in Theodosiopolis, modern Erzurum).
