= Olnut =

District of the old Armenian region of Taron

Olnut or Ernut is a district of the old Armenian region of Taron.

== See also ==
- List of regions of ancient Armenia
