= Aravelian =

Ancient principality in Anatolia, Kingdom of Armenia

Aravelian was a principality within the ancient Kingdom of Armenia in northeastern Anatolia, headed by the eponymous family. It was largely autonomous between 400 and 800 AD, after which the kingdom fell.

In 451, it is reported that there were four rulers that acted jointly: Phapag, Phabak, Varonden and Tal or Dal Aravelian. In 640 the ruler was Khatchean Aravelian.

== See also ==
- List of regions of old Armenia
