= Diocese of Pontus =

Diocese of the Roman Empire

Diocese of Pontus Dioecesis Pontica Διοίκησις Πόντου
- Diocese of the Roman Empire
- 314–535; 548–7th century
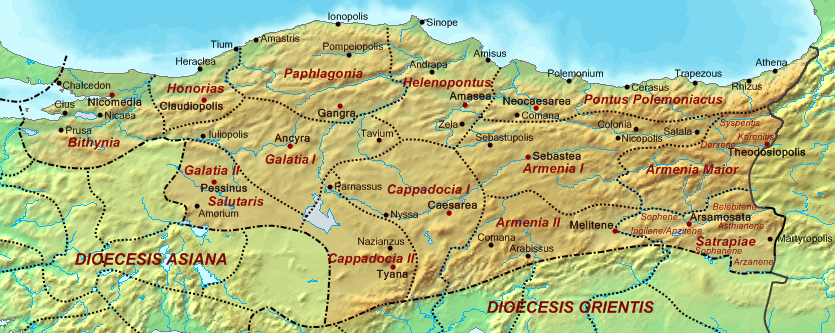
- The Diocese of Pontus c. 400.
- Capital: Amaseia
- Historical era: Late Antiquity
  - Established: 314
  - replaced by the theme system: 660s
- Today part of: Turkey

The Diocese of Pontus (Latin: Dioecesis Pontica, Greek: Διοίκησις Πόντου/Ποντικῆς) was a diocese of the later Roman Empire, incorporating the provinces of northern and northeastern Asia Minor up to the border with the Sassanid Empire in Armenia. The diocese was established after the reforms of Diocletian, and its vicarius, headquartered at Amaseia, was subordinate to the Praetorian prefecture of the East. Its military forces, facing the Sassanid threat, were commanded by the dux Ponti et Armeniae until the middle of the 5th century, and by two separate duces afterwards, until Justinian I instituted a new magister militum per Armeniam for the Armenian frontier. Justinian's reforms also abolished the diocese in 535, and its vicar was made into the governor of Galatia I. The results however were not satisfactory, and the diocese was reestablished in 548, continuing to function until replaced by the themata of Armeniakon and Opsikion in the later 7th century. On the north east shore of the Black Sea, the cities Nitike, Pitiyus, and Dioscurias were part of the diocese until the 7th century. The diocese included 12 provinces: Bithynia, Honorias, Paphlagonia, Helenopontus, Pontus Polemoniacus, Galatia I and Galatia II (Salutaris), Cappadocia I and Cappadocia II, Armenia I, Armenia II, Armenia Maior and the autonomous Armenian principalities (Satrapiae) in the area of Sophene. In 536, Armenia III and Armenia IV were created.
