= Yardymly =

Yardymly or Yardımlı may refer to:

- Yardymli District, a rayon of Azerbaijan
  - Yardımlı, the capital city of Yardymly district
  - Yardymly (meteorite), a meteorite that fell in Yardymly in 1959
