= Kajberunik =

Kajberunik (Armenian: Քաջբերունիք, romanized: K’ajberunik’), earlier known as Ałiovit (Armenian: Աղիովիտ), was a historical district (gavar) of the Vaspurakan province of Greater Armenia, located on the northern shore of Lake Van. In the medieval period it was the territory of the Kajberuni noble house.

== Name ==
Ethnographer Manuel Mirakhorian explains the name Kajberunik as meaning "having an excellent fortress" (from the Armenian k’aj 'excellent, brave', berd 'fortress' and uni '[it] has'). Kajberuni was the name of the noble house which controlled the district. The older name Ałiovit is derived by Suren Yeremian from Armenian ałi 'salty' and hovit 'valley', giving the meaning "salt valley". Per Yeremian, neighboring Lake Van (a saltwater lake) was sometimes called Ałi lich 'Salt Lake' after the district. But Robert H. Hewsen points to the toponym Daranałi where, as Nicholas Adontz argued, ałi is a Kartvelian suffix (*ali, corresponding to Georgian -eti) meaning "belonging to".

== Geography ==
According to the Dictionary of Toponymy of Armenia and Adjacent Territories, Kajberunik was originally part of the district of Arberan. It came under the control of a line of junior princes (sepuhs) of the royal Arsacid dynasty of Armenia, called the Kajberuni, and subsequently formed a separate district. In the medieval period, Kajberunik came to encompass all of Arberan, as well as the districts of Ałiovit (Turuberan province) and Garni/Darni (Vaspurakan province). At a later date (per Robert H. Hewsen, in the period of Arab rule), Kajberunik referred to the territory of Ałiovit. It was also called "the country of Archesh" (Archeshu or Archeshoy erkir) after the city located on its territory. Besides Archesh, the other chief town of the district was Zarishat.

According to Nicholas Adontz, Ałiovit was originally a part of the district of Apahunik. The western part of Ałiovit belonged to the Gnuni noble house while the eastern part was a crown land; there, for example, were located the "royal fisheries" called Arestavan. Yeremian states that the division of Ałiovit into two parts probably dates back to the time of Artaxias I (r. 189–160 BC). Cyril Toumanoff writes that the Gnunis owned Ałiovit with the city of Archesh and Arberani to the east with the city of Berkri. But, according to the old Armenian history of Movses Khorenatsi, King Artavazd (r. 55–30 BC) gave these two districts to his siblings for their support, and later kings followed his example. For this reason, Zarishat in Ałiovit is called a "royal city" by Khorenatsi. In Hewsen's view, the Gnunis acquired these districts only after the fall of the Arsacid Armenian monarchy in 428. The second Byzantine–Persian partition of Armenia in 591 left Ałiovit divided between Byzantine Inner Armenia and Persian Vaspurakan. Thus originated the eastern and western Ałiovits, with the former remaining a Gnuni holding and the latter eventually coming into the possession of the house of Kajberuni. Toumanoff implies that the Kajberunis gained all of Ałiovit, but Hewsen disagrees.

The southern parts of the district were mainly verdant plains. Its climate was temperate. The Archesh (Ororan) and Irishat streams flowed through the district. In the north the Tsałkants mountains separated Kajberunik from the districts of Tsałkotn, Bagrevand, and Apahunik. It bordered Lake Van to the south, Mount Sipan (Süphan) and the district of Khorhorunik to the southwest.

== History ==
=== 5th century ===
Kajberunik was part of the Arshakuni Kingdom until its fall in the year 428 AD. It was known as a resting area for the younger members of the royal family. Kajberuniq was later integrated into Turuberan Province under the Greater Armenian Kingdom of Bagratuni. The Kajberuni princely family contributed arms and warriors in the Battle of Avarayr against the Persians in 451 AD under the leadership of Nerseh Kajberuni – who was killed during the battle along with seven other members of the family.

=== 7th century ===
The Kajberunik canton was ultimately conquered by the caliphate (in the 9th century the province was integrated into the Kaysik's empire), following an entry into the Kingdom of Vaspurakan. The canton eventually fell under the Byzantine Empire's rule in the year 1021 AD.

=== 9th century ===
Kajberunik was taken over by the Kaysites and later overrun by the Seljuk Turks. Later in the succession, the province was conquered by the Shah Armens, the Ayyubids, and the Mongols. In 850, Grigor Kajberuni joined the forces of Bagrat II Bagratuni in his failed rebellion against the Abbasid caliph.

=== 16th–17th centuries ===
Kajberuniq was affected by the Turkish-Persian war. At the beginning of the 17th century, the Persian Shah Abbas 1st relocated thousands of Armenians from Kajberuniq into Persia. Under the conventions of Amasia (1555 AD) and Kasre-Shirin (1639 AD), control over the Kajberuniq province was transferred over to the Ottoman Empire, which became known as the Arjesh province of Van.

=== 19th century ===
Lake Van's water level increased in the year 1841 AD, which resulted in the destruction of the city of Arjesh. The village-town of Akants (Turkish: Erciş) became the administrative center for the region following the destruction of Arjesh. About 26 thousand Armenians suffered heavy losses in the province during the Hamidian massacres of 1896 AD.

=== 20th century ===
On the eve of the First World War, around 10 to 15 thousand Armenians lived in the canton of Kajberuniq – mainly engaged in grain, horticulture, crafts, and fishing industries. A significant portion of the population residing in the Kajberuniq province was massacred during the Armenian genocide in 1915. Genocide survivors escaped the canton and found refuge in Eastern Armenia.

=== Shurishkan Gospel ===
In 1498, Turvanda prince of Vaspurakan requested T. Barsegh priest of Aspisnak village of Kajberuniq canton, to make a copy of the gospel – which later became known as Shurishan. It was difficult to imagine at the time that this manuscript would be highly admired and cherished by the Armenians of the region. The Persian king Abbas I forcefully relocated thousands of Armenians from the Lake Van area into Persia in the 17th century – the book was carefully carried to Peria, which was the most Armenian populated province of Persia at the time.

== See also ==
- List of regions of ancient Armenia
