= Turuberan =

Historical province of Greater Armenia

Տուրուբերան
- Province of the ancient kingdom of Armenia
- 189 BC–XI AD
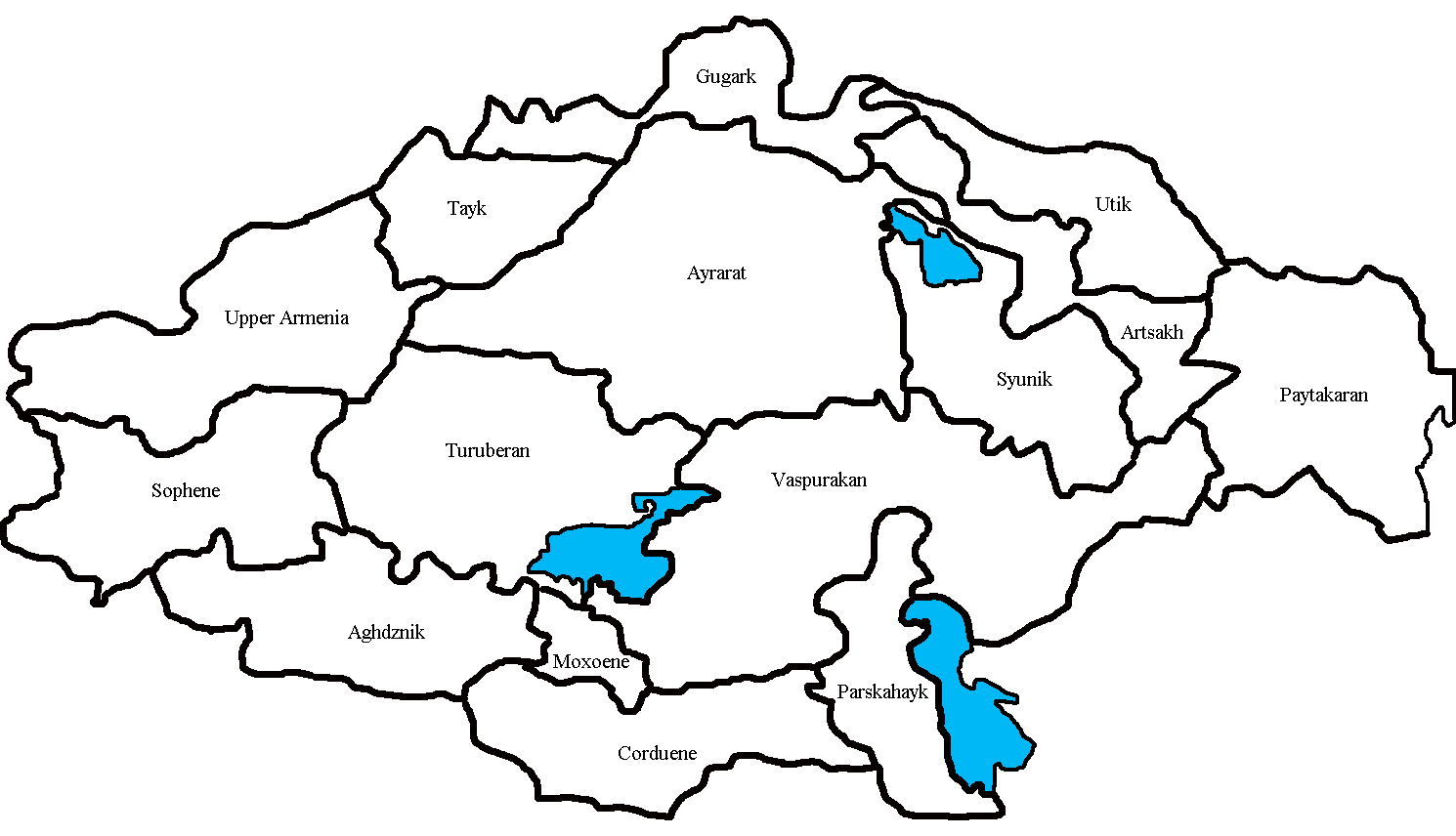
- Capital: Malazgirt
- History
  - Artaxias I declaring himself independent: 189 BC
  - Seljuk conquests: XI AD XI AD
- Today part of: Turkey

Turuberan (Armenian: Տուրուբերան), also known as Tavruberan (Armenian: Տաւրուբերան) was the fourth Armenian region that was part of the ancient Kingdom of Armenia from 189 BC to 387 AD. Then it was part of the Sassanid Empire, Byzantine Empire, Arab Caliphate, medieval Kingdom of Armenia, Zakarian Armenia, various Turco-Mongol states, Safavid Empire, and finally the Ottoman Empire. A very large Armenian population remained until the Armenian genocide in 1915. Currently it is situated in Turkey's south-east.

== Divisions ==
The area of Turuberan region was 25,008 km^{2} (10,000 sq mi).

It had 16 cantons:

- Khouyt
- Aspakunyats Dzor
- Taron
- Ashmunik
- Mardaghi
- Dastavork
- Tvaratsatap
- Dalar
- Hark
- Varazhnunik
- Bznunik
- Yerevark
- Kajberunik or Aghiovit
- Apahunik
- Koro Gavar
- Khorkhorunik

== See also ==
- List of regions of old Armenia
- Kingdom of Armenia (antiquity)
