= Tork Angegh =

God in Armenian mythology

- God of strength, courage, manufacturing
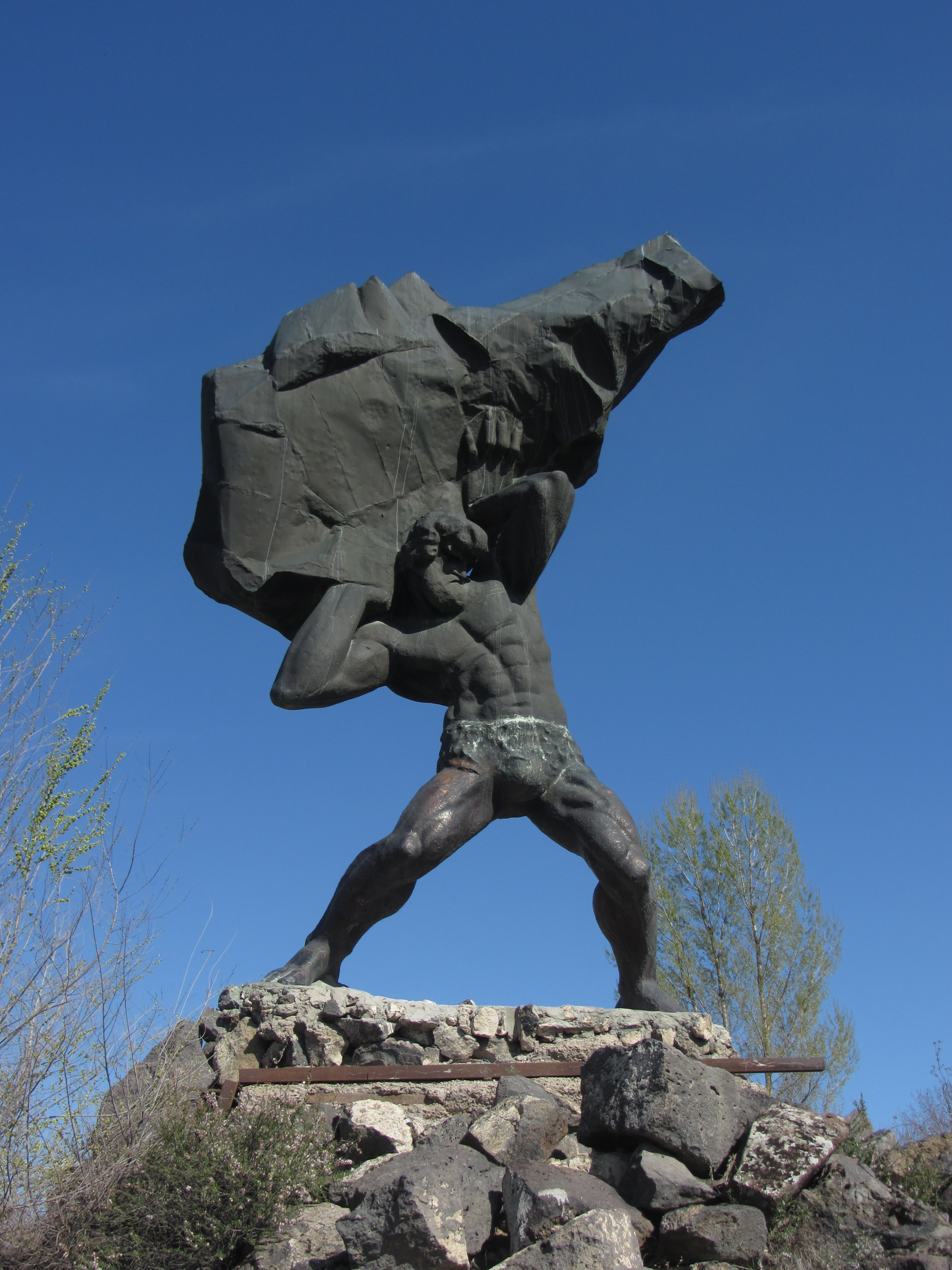
- Monument to Tork Angegh (1982) in Yerevan, Armenia, by sculptor Karlen Nurijanyan
- Gender: male
- Ethnic group: Armenian
- Parents: Hayk (grand-grandparent)

Equivalents
- German: Thor, Týr

Tork Angegh (Armenian: Տորք Անգեղ, romanized: Tork’ Angeġ) is a deity of strength, courage, manufacturing and the arts in Armenian mythology. A creature of unnatural strength and power, Tork was considered one of the great-grandsons of Hayk, the legendary patriarch of the Armenian people. He was reportedly represented as an unattractive male figure. He is mentioned by the early Armenian historian Movses Khorenatsi and is considered one of the significant deities of the Armenian pantheon prior to the time when it came under influence by Iranian and Hellenic religion and mythology.

An analogy is frequently made with the Middle-Eastern god Nergal, also represented as an unattractive male.

== Description ==
Tork was a giant with rough figure, cruel look, and huge power. He was named Angegh ('ugly') because of his appearance. He could hurl boulders across the seas, flatten the surfaces of rocks, and draw pictures on them with his nails.

== The myth ==
Tork Angegh was a shepherd, but not an ordinary one, he was heroic. When lions and tigers saw him, they approached him thinking that he also was a beast and their mighty king. One spring Tork was sad, and he couldn’t get rid of his sadness. He was wondering days and nights looking at the sun with his sad eyes.

The goddess Astghik seeing him from the sky, came down to him and asked the reason of his sadness. Tork replied that the reason of his sadness was his loneliness, being without love, and no one would love someone giant and ugly like him. And the goddess of love told him about the beautiful virgin Haykanush, only she could love Tork. Tork found the beauty, he got mutual love and it dispelled his sadness.

Tork Angegh did not use a sword or arrows. He aroused horror in his enemies only with his appearance. But if they overcame their shock, then he used his strength. Once, invaders came to the shore of the Pontic Sea on ships and attacked the Armenian settlements. Tork got the news of great devastation and went against the enemies. From a distance, they saw his terrifying height and fierce power, and ran back to their ships. Tork arrived at the shore when the fleet of the enemy was already quite far. Furious, he cut rocks in the size of hills and threw them at the enemy: when the rocks hit the sea, powerful surges rose and sank the enemies' ships.

== Origin ==
It is generally assumed that Tork Angegh is a combination of two deities, who have left traces of themselves in his name: Tarku, the ancient Anatolian deity of fertility, and Angegh, a pagan god who was venerated mainly in the province of Angegh, in south-western Armenia. Historian Movses Khorenatsi also states that he was a prince of that province, hence the references in Armenian history to Angegha tun (the House of Angegh). According to this view, the name Tork Angegh means Tork of Angegh rather than Tork the Ugly. It is also interesting to note that in the ancient Armenian translation of the Bible, the name of the Babylonian god Nargal (4 Kings 17: 30) is rendered Angegh.
