= Citharizum =

Town and fortress

Roman-Persian Frontier in Late Antiquity. The Roman fortress is designated as "Citharizum".

Citharizum (Greek: Κιθαρίζων) was a town and fortress on the south arm of the Euphrates in the Roman province of Armenia III. It was a place of great strength which was built by the emperor Justinian and was the residence of one of the five prefects whom that emperor placed over Roman Armenia with the title of “Dux.”

According to Procopius of Caesarea, the city was located in the Asthianene region. The fortress was separated from Theodosiopolis (ancient Armenia) by a journey of four days. Balabitene, a region between Mons Masius and Anti-Taurus, north of Commagene and Mesopotamia, is also discussed as a possible location. Citharizum is often associated with the modern village of Keteriz.

Although only a small town, it was an important point of defence for the Byzantine Empire against the Persians. Justinian built a castle there, in which he stationed a garrison under the command of a duke. In 613, it was taken by Ashot, a general of the Persian king, Chosroes II.

== Bishopric ==
The only diocesan bishop of the see whose name is recorded is Marcian, who attended the Trullan Council of 692.

No longer a residential bishopric, Citharizum is today listed by the Catholic Church as a titular see.
