= Yardymly (meteorite) =

Meteorite found in Azerbaijan

Yardymly meteorite
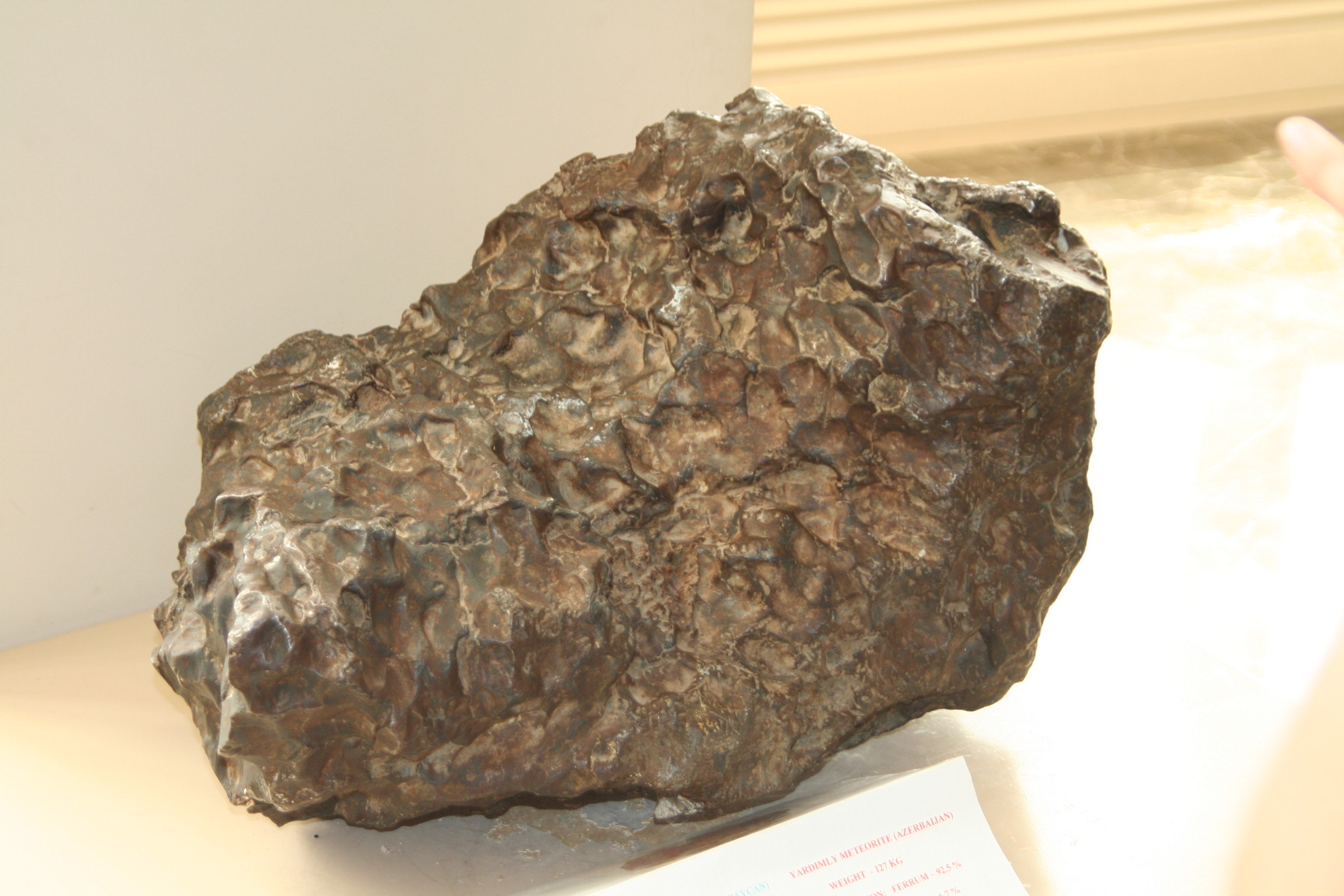
- In Şamaxı Astrophysical Observatory
- Type: Iron
- Structural classification: Coarse octahedrite
- Group: IAB complex
- Composition: 92,7% Fe, 6.6% Ni, 0.41% Co, 0.18% P
- Country: Azerbaijan
- Region: Yardymli Rayon
- Coordinates: 38°56′N 48°15′E
- Observed fall: Yes
- Fall date: November 24, 1959
- TKW: 150.29 kilograms (331.3 lb)
- Alternative names: Aroos, Iardymlinskii, Jardymlinsky, Yardymlinskii
- Related media on Wikimedia Commons

The Yardymly meteorite (also known as Aroos meteorite, Azerbaijani: Yardımlı meteoriti or Ərus meteoriti) is an iron meteorite that fell in Yardymli Rayon, Azerbaijan on November 24, 1959. The remains were discovered in the nearby village of Aroos. With five individual specimens, the total weight of the meteorite is estimated at 150.29 kilograms (331.3 lb). The meteorite is kept in the Institute of Geology of Azerbaijan National Academy of Sciences. According to the director of Şamaxı Astrophysical Observatory Eyub Guliyev, the Yardymli meteorite may originate from the shower of Perseids.

The eyewitnesses saw the bright bolide flying through clouds from southwest to northeast. The falling was accompanied by a bright, blinding flare brighter than solar illumination and a noise similar to rolling thunder. The illumination embraced the area of ca. 2,800 square kilometres (1,100 mi^{2}). The fall of individual pieces was accompanied by a whistling and drone, resembling that produced by a jet aircraft or missile. The examination of chemical and physical properties of the meteorite was led by Azeri researcher Mirali Qashqai. The meteorite features a sizeable Widmanstätten pattern and an anomalously low amount of tritium. Similar tritium anomalies were detected previously in other iron meteorites.

At the request of American scientists, the Soviet Meteorite Committee sent the meteorite samples to California University, Cambridge Astrophysical Observatory and the Institute for Nuclear Researches of Chicago University, as well as to CERN. One of the samples was preserved in Fersman Mineralogical Museum.

== Individual pieces ==
In order of discovery:

- 1st 11.3 kilograms (25 lb)
- 2nd 5.7 kilograms (13 lb)
- 3rd 5.93 kilograms (13.1 lb)
- 4th 0.36 kilograms (0.79 lb)
- 5th 127 kilograms (280 lb)

== See also ==
- Glossary of meteoritics
