= Tsopk Shahunyats =

Tsopk Shahunyats was a gavar (canton) in the Sophene region of ancient Greater Armenia c. 400–800, in the Armenia Sophene or Sophanene.

== See also ==
- List of regions of ancient Armenia
