= Mirali Qashqai =

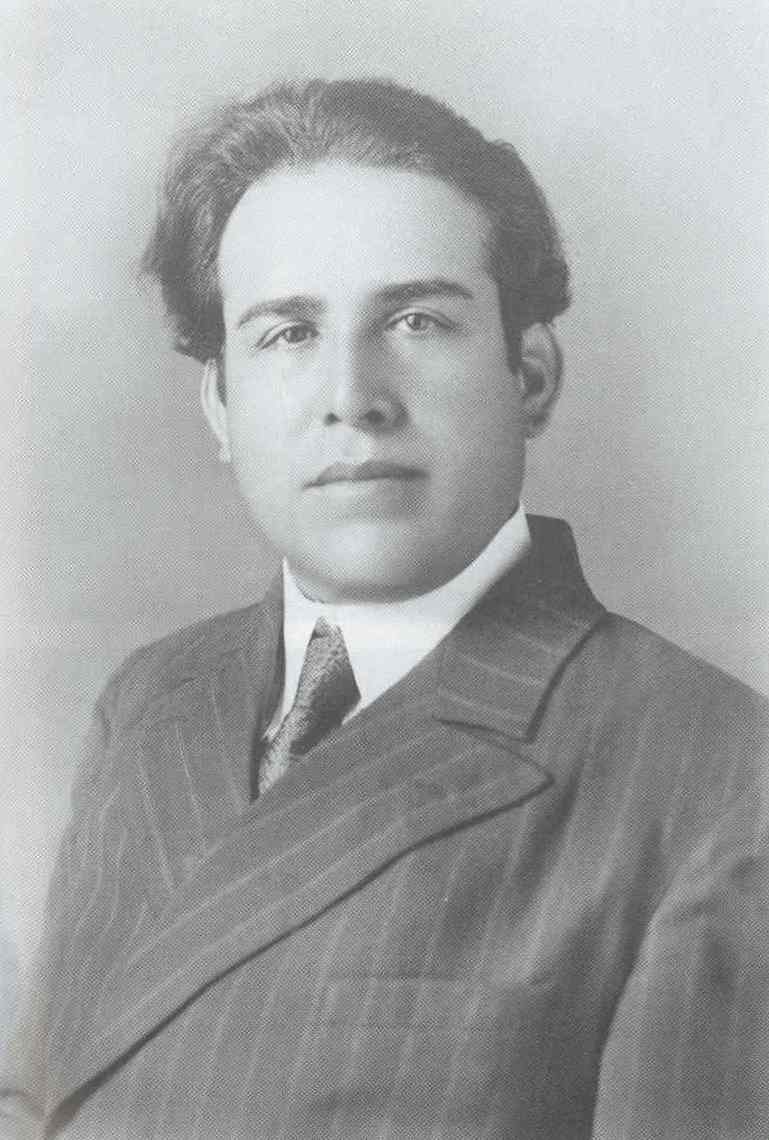
- Born: January 20, 1907; Yelizavetpol, Caucasus Viceroyalty, Russian Empire
- Died: April 23, 1977 (aged 70); Baku, Azerbaijan SSR, Soviet Union
- Awards: Order of the Red Banner of Labour
- Scientific career
- Fields: Geologist
- Workplaces: National Academy of Sciences of the Azerbaijan SSR

Mirali Seyidali oglu Qashqai (Azerbaijani: Mirəli Seyidəli oğlu Qaşqay; January 20, 1907 – April 23, 1977) was an eminent Azerbaijani and Soviet geologist, author of multitude works in the sphere of geomorphology and stratigraphy. He was an honorary member of Mineralogical Society, former chairman of Azerbaijani department of the Society, and full member of the National Academy of Sciences of the Azerbaijan SSR. He was one of the founders of scientific school in the sphere geologo-mineralogical sciences and he was the supervisor of geochemistry and mineralogy of ore departments of Geology Institute of the National Academy of Sciences of Azerbaijan.

Most important works of Mir Ali Gashgai were dedicated to petrology and mineralogy of Azerbaijan. Qashqai studied the iron-cobalt and alunite deposits of Dashkasan and discovered the deposits of obsidian and perlite in Kalbajar (together with A. Mammadov). Together with S. Aliyev, he compiled the geothermic map of Azerbaijan and proposed the theory of volcanic origin of Caucasian pyrite and chalcopyrite instead of the intrusive one. Following the landfall of Yardymly meteorite in 1959 he led the examination of its chemical and physical properties.

== Primary dates of life and activity ==
- 1912 – Mir Ali Gashgai entered Ganja gymnasium.
- 1919 – Mir Ali's mother Habiba Khanim and his uncle Jamil was shot to death by bandits in a home invasion, and Mir Ali was injured.
- 1920 – Mir Ali was taken to local theatre as the actor and later he became the director of the theatre. Mir Ali's family, which was deprived of livelihood was supported by his salary.
- 1923 – He left Ganja and moved to Baku.
- 1924 – He entered the first course of geological-exploratory department of mining faculty of Azerbaijan State Polytechnic Institute.
- 1930 – After the graduation he became the director of geological-exploratory works in alunite deposits of Zagliksk.
- 1930–1935 – Education years in a graduate school of Petrographical Institute of the Academy of Sciences of the Azerbaijan SSR (Leningrad), expeditionary trips to the North Caucasus, Azerbaijan and Siberia. Three research papers were the result of Siberian expeditions, which were published in the works of Petrographical Institution, in publishing house of the Academy of Sciences of the USSR, under the edition of the Council for analysis of natural resources.
- 1934 – Gashgai studied mineral sources of Isti-su in Azerbaijan, collected materials for Candidate's dissertation. Later, these mineral sources will be the separate area of his scientific activity.
- 1935 – successful defense of the dissertation in Moscow, in a session of the board of experts of the Institute of Geological Sciences of the Academy of Sciences of the Soviet Union. Leading one of the brigades of the North Caucasian petrographical-chemical expedition of the Academy of Sciences of the USSR, he went to study minerals in Karachay autonomous oblast. Research paper “On the northern slope of the Main Caucasian ridge”, where was written about characteristics of minerals of the North Caucasus was the result of the mission.
- 1935-1936 – Worked as the scientist-expert in the Geological department of the Academy of Sciences of the USSR in Moscow under the guidance of professor P.I.Lebedyev. Composition of geological and geochemical maps of vast territories of Altai, the Southern Siberia, the Northern Caucasus – the main result of Russian period in the life of Azerbaijani scientist.
- 1936 – He returned to the motherland, where he worked as the senior research officer of Azerbaijani branch of the Academy of Sciences and associate professor of geology cathedra of the university. The expedition, which he led opened six new chromite deposits- valuable raw material for metallurgical industry, deposits of sulfuric pyrite (necessary for oil refinement) and iron minium in mountains of Lesser Caucasus. He released a book “Geological terms” (in Azerbaijani and Russian languages) together with such young scientists as K.Alizade, G.Efendiyev and S.Mammadzade.

== Works ==
- The hydrothermal-metasomatic formation of Kaolin and genetic classification of clay rocks. Clay miner. Bull., London, 1959, vol. 4, No.21ю
- On the Alpientype veins of Caucasus, Just. Lugas Mallada. C.S.L.O., Madrid, 1960.
