= Gnuni =

Armenian noble family

Gnuni (Armenian: Գնունի; c. 300–800.) was a princely family in Armenia, who ruled the region of Aliovit, including the cities of Archesh, Arberani and Berkri on the northern shore of Lake Van. They were an offshoot of the Orontids.

Main rulers:

- Atat Gnuni c. 387, deposed
- Atom Gnuni c. 445
- Vahan Gnuni c. 451
- Atom and Arastom Gnuni c. 480
- Mjej Gnuni c. 628
- Vahan a.k.a. Dachnak c. 772

Around 772, Manazkert and Aghiovit were occupied by the Qayasite Dynasty.

== See also ==
- List of regions of old Armenia

== Sources ==
- Toumanoff, Cyril (1961). "Introduction to Christian Caucasian History: II: States and Dynasties of the Formative Period". Traditio. 17. Cambridge University Press: 1–106. doi:10.1017/S0362152900008473. JSTOR 27830424. S2CID 151524770. (registration required)
