= Camachus =

Town in the Roman province of Armenia III

Camachus was a town in the Roman province of Armenia III. The true primitive name seems to have been Camacha. Camachus, Camachum and Camache are later forms. It is today Kemah in eastern Turkey.

== History ==
The town enclosed a celebrated temple of the god Aramazd, containing a great number of literary monuments, which were destroyed by the orders of St. Gregory of Armenia. Here were deposited the treasures of the Armenian kings, as well as many of their tombs: hence the name - the word Gamakh by which it was known in Armenian signifying "corpse". The Byzantine emperors kept a strong garrison there to defend the eastern part of their empire from the attacks of the Muslims, up to the commencement of the 11th century.

== Bishopric ==
The episcopal see of Camachus does not appear in ecclesiastical history before the 7th century. When the Pseudo-Ecthesis of Epiphanius was drawn up (about 640), it was not yet a see. But in 681, George, "Bishop of Daranalis or Camachus", was present at the Third Council of Constantinople and subscribed its acts as "bishop of the clima of Daranalis"; a third name of the see, Analibla, is given by the old Latin version. The same prelate subscribed (692) the acts of the Trullan Council. Another bishop of Camachus, Sisinnius, took part in a synod called by Patriarch Alexius of Constantinople in 1029.

About the end of the 9th century, Camachus, until then a suffragan of Sebaste (metropolis of Armenia I), was made a metropolitan see by Leo the Philosopher; it had five, and at one time eight, suffragan sees.

By the 15th century the residential see had disappeared. Accordingly, it is today listed by the Catholic Church as a titular see.
