= List of regions of ancient Armenia =

Regions of ancient Armenia

This is a list of regions and or districts of ancient Armenia.

== Aghdznik ==
| Name | Map | Additional information |
|---|---|---|
| Aznvats Valley | | Also known as Aznvadzor. |
| Aghdzn | | Also known as Arzn, Araksene, Ardzn, or Kharzan. It is located in the southeastern part of the province, north of the Tigris River. It included the lower basins of the Arza and Bitlis tributaries of the Western Tigris. It had an area of more than 3500 km^{2}. In ancient sources it is mentioned as Arzanenae. The Armenian historian Yeghishe names the region Arznarzyu, Tovma Artsruni as Arzn Aghdzniats. Aghdz was connected to Ayrarat, the central province of the Kingdom of Armenia, by the road passing through the Bitlis mountain pass (Dzorapahak). The province was the capital of the Aghdznik province. The city of Arzn was located in the canton. |
| Angeghtun/Kagh | | Located within the Eğil district in Turkey. Within the canton was the fortress city of Angegh, the ruins of which are located south of Diyarbakır, on the right bank of the upper Tigris. It is assumed that the name Angegh originated from the deity of the same name. However, there were also other places named after Tork Angegh in other regions. When the canton was renamed to Kagh, the city was renamed to Kghimar. The region was known to the Greeks and Romans as Ingelene (Ancient Greek: Ἰγγηληνή; Latin: Ingilena) and to the Hittites as Ingalawa (Hittite:𒅔𒃲𒀀𒉿Ingalawa). |
| Gzheghkh | | Today's Hizan, located in the upper valley of the Bitlis river. In Assyrian and Babylonian tablets, the region was known as Gilzanu. At the north of the canton lay the Zorapahak mountain pass. The region held the road that connected the Armenian highlands to Mesopotamia. |
| Ketik | | Mentioned in Anania Shirakatsi's Ashkharhatsuyts. Its exact location is uncertain, according to Hübschmann, the region is located in the Maden River Valley. According to Yeremyan, the canton bordered Mokk from the east, Korchayk from the south, Aghdznik from the west, and the Yerkhetk canton in the north. Some people assumed that the city of Tigranakert was founded in this canton. |
| Nprkert | | Within this canton lies the city of Martirosats (known as Martyropolis, later renamed to Mufarghin). The canton spread throughout the mid to lower reaches of the Kaghri river. Nprkert is a lowland canton with hot and dry climates, lacking any forests. The northern section of the canton lays the Ilija mountains. It is believed that the city of Tigranakert was founded within this region. |
| Salno Dzor | | Most likely today's Bitlis. |
| Sanasunk | | Also known as Sasun. Most of the region lies within the upper reaches of the Batman River. It bordered the region of Khut in the east, which used to be a part of the Sanasunk region. The region got its name from the Armenian legendary figure Sanasar, who, according to the legend, was the son of the Assyrian king Sennacherib who fled with his brother, Baghdasar, to Sanasunk after killing his father. He would build a fortress and gather residents. The region of Sanasunk lies on the Taurus Mountains. |
| Tatik | | Also known as Dadik, Datik, Tatko, Tatku, Kuzeltere, and Gyozaldara. The canton lies in the valley of the Tatik River, southeast of the city of Baghesh. The main settlement of the region was Khultik. |
| Yerkhetk | | Also known as Kherhetk, now known as Sgherd. It spread through the lower reaches of the Baghesh river, east of the Aghdzn canton. The region is rarely ever mentioned by historians. The main settlement of the region was Sghert. |

== Artsakh ==
| Name | Map | Additional information |
|---|---|---|
| Berdadzor | | Also known as Beradzor, Berdzor, Berdzork, or Ayrum. The region lies within the region between the Araks and Aghavno rivers. The region would be divided between the principalities of Dizak and Varanda in the late Middle age. Its city center was Berdzor. |
| Harchlank | | Located in the region between the Karkar River and the Goris-Shushi road. |
| Koght | | Included the northern slopes of the Mrav Mountain Range and the basin of the Shamkor river, and stretched to the Tus river. Before the arrival of the Seljuks and Mongols, it was under the rule of the Aranshahiks of Artsakh and later passed down to the Vahram branch of the Zakarid, whose seat of power was the Gag Fortress. In the late Middle Ages, the region was divided into two regions; Shamkor and Zakam. |
| Kusti | | With the administrative center being Parisos, the region extended between the middle triburaty of the Shamkhor river and the crest of the Sevan Mountain range, and the banks of the Akhnji river, the southeastern tributary of the Tavush river, and the mouth of the field. The territory of the province is about 700 km^{2}. In the Middle Ages, the provinces of Kusti and Parnes were included in the principality of Parisos. |
| Mets Arank | | Also known as Metsirank. It occupies the upper basin of Khachen river, from the Karkar river to the Trtu river and from the skirts of Kirsa mountain to the western end of the Martakert plain. The territory of the province is about 1600 km^{2}. In the late Middle Ages it was called Jraberd after the castle of Jraberd. |
| Mets Kvenk | | It is located in the Kurak river basins of the Trtu tributary, Trghi, including Shahumyan region and the surrounding Getashen sub-region. |
| Mukhank | | Also known as Mokhank. The administrative center was the village of Gish. The province is located south of the Gargar River and occupies an area of 1250 km^{2}. It was the domain of the Mkhants princely dynasty. In the second half of the 5th century, Mukhank was separated from Armenia and ceded Caucasian Albania. At the beginning of the 9th century, Stepanos Ablasad was the prince of Muhank, who, with the help of Babek, defeated and expelled the Balasagans from the borders of his domains. However, the latter managed to kill Stepanos Ablasad and took possession of his estates. 12 years later, Southern Artsakh prince Yesai Abu Musa, who was the son of Stepanos Ablasad's sister, recaptured Mukhank from the Balasagans, as well as the provinces that belonged to his uncle until then. |
| Myus Haband | | |
| Parnes | | Also known as Parisos, the administrative center was Parnes. It lays between the middle tributary of the Shamkor river and the continuation of the crest of the Gegham mountain range and the banks of Akhnji and the mouth of the southeastern tributary of the Tavush river. The territory of the province is about 700 km^{2}. In the Middle Ages, the provinces of Kusti and Parnes were included in the kingdom of Parisos. |
| Parzkank | | Other names are Parskank, Partskank, Pantskank, Paytskan and Pazkank. It mainly occupies the coastal regions of Araks. The province borders the Araks from the south, The canton of Piank from the east, Myus Haband from the north, and Berdadzor from the northwest. Within the mentioned borders, the area of the province is about 2000 km^{2}. |
| Piank | | It includes the lowland regions of Artsakh. It borders the Araks River from the south, Ishkhanaget from the west, Myus Haband from the north and northwest, and Paytakaran from the east. The area is about 800 km^{2}. |
| Sisakan-i-Kotak | | Also known as Sisakan-i-Vostan. The name is of Persian origin and means Little Sisakan." |
| Vaykunik | | |

== Ayrarat ==
| Name | Map | Additional information |
|---|---|---|
| Abeghyank | | Also known as Abelyankq, Abelunk Myus, Abeghank, Abeghenk, Abeghenk Myus, and Abeghunik. Urartian inscriptions by King Sarduri II mentioned the region as Abilianihi. The region is located west of the Araks river, between the Metsrats mountains, near the village of Mzhnkert. The region was home to the Abeghean royal house. The approximate area of the province was around 1000 km^{2}, the administrative center was the fortified city of Mzhnkert. |
| Aragatsotn | | This region held the cities of Armavir and Vagharshapat, both of which were capitals of the kingdom at one point. Vagharshapat was originally known as Vardagesavan, until the reign of Vologases I of Armenia, who renamed the settlement after him and made it the capital. In the Middle Ages, the northern region of the Aragatsotn region was renamed to Amberd, after the Amberd Fortress. The administrative center of the region was Oshakan. Other notable settlements were Yervandashat, Aghdzk, and Yervandakert. |
| Arats | | The administrative center of this region was Arats. |
| Arsharunik | | Also known as Yeraskhadzor. It originally belonged to the Arsacid royal house, but was later passed on to the Kamsarakan ministerial house. It is believed that it got its name from the name of the first ruler of the province, Arshavir Kamsarakan. The province spread in the western corner formed by the Araks and Akhuryan rivers. During the period of Arab rule, along with many other ministerial houses of Armenia, the Kamsarakans gradually lost their political influence. The campaign played a particularly important role during the reign of the Bagratunis. The most notable historical places of the province are the cities of Yervandashat, Yervandakert, Bagaran and Artagers Castle. |
| Ashotsk | | Also known as Ashotsan or Arshotsan. The administrative center of the region is Ashotsk. The territory corresponds with the Ghukasyan district of the Shirak Province of Armenia. Ashotsk is mentioned in the Urartian records as Ishkigulu. Prior to the first partition of Armenia, it was most likely included in Gugark Province and then Ayrarat Province. Ashotsk was the hereditary property of the Ashotsyan ministerial house. |
| Bagrevand | | Today's Alashkert. According to one theory, Bagrevand was the home province of the Bagratunis. According to Greek chroniclers, Bagravaden. According to another version, it got its name because of the Bagins (Altars). It spread in the upper region of the Aratzani, between Haykakan Par mountain range, Tsakhkants and Diadini mountains. In ancient times, Bagrevand occupied a larger area, including the Tsaghkotn province. Alashkert field made up most of Bagrevand territory. Vagharshakert fortress, Bagavan town, and Dzirav field are the famous historical places of the province. Mount Npat is also located here. |
| Basen | | |
| Chakatk | | |
| Gabeghyank | | The home province of the Gabeghyan family. The city of Kaghzvan is located here. |
| Havnunik | | |
| Kogovit | | |
| Kotayk | | Yerevan was the capital of the province with modern Kotayk marz bearing the name from the province itself. Also named Kotakene. |
| Masyats Votn | | |
| Mazaz | | |
| Nig | | Today's Aparan and Bjni. The regions administrative center was Kasagh (today's Aparan). It was regions of Mazaz and Varazhnunik would later be separated from Nig during the process of feudalization. The lords of the region were the Gntuni family. |
| Sharur Dasht | | Until the 5th century, the region of Sharur Dasht was the king estate province of the Kingdom. After liberation from Arab rule the region was gifted by Smbat I of Armenia to the Siunid princes. |
| Shirak | | |
| Tsaghkotn | | Also known as Tsaghkeont and Tsaghkutn. Today's Diyadin. The region belonged to the ministerial house of the Gnunis but were later passed onto the Arsacids. The region borders Kogovit to the Northeast, Bagrevand from the west, Vaspurakan from the south, and Turuberan from the southwest. It is spread across the upper basin of the Aratsani river on the slopes of the Tsaghkants mountains. |
| Upper Tashir | | The administrative center of this region was Tandzut. |
| Urtsadzor | | The administrative center of this region was Urts (or Urdz). The Prince of Urts in 451 was Varaz-Nerses; he participated in that year's uprising. |
| Vanand | | Also known as Anpayt Basyan or Verin Basyan. The administrative center of the region was Kars. The region is bordered by the Zarishat mountains and the region of Javakhk in the north, the Yeghnakhagh valley and Kars plateau as well as the regions of Ashotsk and Shirak in the east. From the south, the region borders the Arsharunik (Yeraskhadzor) mountains and the Metsrats and Abeghyank regions, while on the west are the Karmir Porak mountain range divided by the regions of Partizats Por, Berdats Por, Kogh, and Artahan. |
| Varazhnunik | | The administrative center of the region was Hovk (today's Dilijan). Was rules by Varazhnuni noble family |
| Vostan Hayots | | Literally translating to "Court of the Armenians", since within this region house Artashat and Dvin, two of the Kingdom's capitals during the Artaxiad and the Arsacid dynasty. The region occupied the middle and lower reaches of the Azat River. Some notable places of interest located in this region are Khor Virap, Kakavaberd, and the Khosrov reserve. |

== Gugark ==
| Name | Map | Additional information |
|---|---|---|
| Artahan | | |
| Boghnopor | | |
| Dzorapor | | |
| Kangark | | |
| Kgharjk | | |
| Koghbapor | | |
| Kvishapor | | |
| Upper Javakhk | | |
| Lower Javakhk | | |
| Manglyats Por | | |
| Shavshet | | |
| Tashir | | |
| Treghk | | |
| Tsobopor | | |

== Korchayk ==
| Name | Map | Additional information |
|---|---|---|
| Aygark | | |
| Aytrvank | | |
| Chahuk | | |
| Kartunik | | |
| Korduk | | |
| Upper Kordrik | | |
| Middle Kordrik | | |
| Lower Kordrik | | |
| Motoghank | | |
| Pokr Aghbak | | |
| Vorsirank | | |

== Mok ==
| Name | Map | Additional information |
|---|---|---|
| Argastovit | | |
| Arkayits Gavar | | |
| Arvenits Dzor | | |
| Ishayr | | |
| Ishots | | |
| Jermadzor | | |
| Mija | | |
| Mok Arandznak | | |
| Myus Ishayr | | |

== Nor Shirakan ==
| Name | Map | Additional information |
|---|---|---|
| Araskh | | Also known as Vovea. The administrative center was the village of Shnavh. |
| Arna | | Also known as Erna. The administrative center was the village of Arna. |
| Ayli | | Also known as Kurichan. The administrative center was the village of Ayli. |
| Her | | |
| Mari | | The administrative center was the village of Mari. |
| Tamber | | The administrative center was the village of Tamber. |
| Trabi | | Trabi is located west of Kaputan Lake, in the basin of the Trabi (Tergewer) River. It was bordered by Ayli from the north, Mari from the south, Kartunik provinces from the west, and Lake Kaputan from the east. With the first division of Armenia in 387, Trabi came under the control of Persia. In the 9th-11th centuries, it entered the domain of the Artsrunis of Vaspurakan. The cities of Urmia and Nakhchavan were located here. |
| Zarehavan | | It was located northwest of Lake Kaputan, in the valley of the Tarono River. North of the province lies the canton of Her, on the south by Tamber, on the west by Arna, on the southwest by the Varazhnunik provinces of Vaspurakan, and on the northeast by Lake Kaputan. With the first partition of Armenia in 387, it came under Persian rule. In the 9th-11th centuries, it came under the rule of the Artsrunis (in the kingdom in 908). Its area roughly corresponds to Salmast province. The significant settlements were the city of Zarehavan, which acted as the administrative center of both the canton and the province, and Saghamas. The region is named after the city of Zarehavan, which itself is named after Zariadres. |
| Zarevand | | Its area corresponded to the current regions of Salmast and Dilman (northwest of Lake Urmia). One of the historical places of the province is the city of Salmast, which is mentioned by Pavstos Buzand. |

== Paytakaran ==
| Name | Map | Additional information |
|---|---|---|
| Alevan | | |
| Aros | | Also known as Bichankhani, Aropizhan, Aros, Arosbichan, Arospijan, Arospijan, Baros, Bijankhani, Bijankhani, Bijankhani, Biroschani, Hani, Pijan, Pijanhanchani, Pijankhani, Pichanhanhani. It was also called Aros, Arosbichan (Aros-Bichan), Arospichan after the village of Aros. It was also called Hani (Bazhanhani, Pichanhani), which is derived from the name of the people who lived in Atropatene in ancient times, identifying it in the Aniana form with Strabo's Aivix. That name is preserved in the name of Ani, with the interpretation of the above-mentioned people moving from Atropatene to Armenia and leaving a settlement named after him. Paytakaran spread in the southern part of the province, in the upper reaches of the Vilyashchai River. The canton orresponds to the area around the village of Ərus, Yardamli district of the present Republic of Azerbaijan. The village of Aros acted as the administrative center of the canton. |
| Atshi | | The administrative center is Bagavan. |
| Bagavan | | The administrative center is Apashahr. |
| Baghan Rot | | Also known as Rot-i-Bagha or Vovtibagha. Unlike the neighbouring regions of Vardanakert and Paytakaran, Armenians did not make a majority, as the Armenian population inhabited the administrative center, Baghan Rot. While Persians and Caspians largely inhabited the villages of the district. Within the city, Armenians only made up at least half the population. |
| Hani | | |
| Hrakot-Perozh | | First mentioned in Anania Shirakatsi's Ashkharhatsuyts. It contained the Movakan plane with the city of Paytakaran. Some academics believed that Herakot and Perozh were separate cantons. It was also known as Paytakaran. |
| Kaghan-Rot | | |
| Koekyan | | |
| Pichan | | Located in the southern regions of Paytakaran, it borders Alevan to the west, Kokean in the north and northeast, and Atropatene to the south and southeast. There were two large cities within the territory of the province, being Pichan and Vardzakan. |
| Spandaran-Perozh | | |
| Vardanakert | | Located within the region was the city fortress of Vardanakert, which lay on the southern side of the Araks river. |
| Vormizd-Perozh | | Also known as Vormizdperozh, Vormzdperdozh, Vormzdperuzh, and Vormzdan. |
| Yotnporakyan Bagink | | The region contained Yotnporakan Bagink (also known as Gabaru Bagink), which was an ancient Armenian pagan temple that was later converted into a monastic complex in the 6th century following the Christianization of Armenia, and was later known as Gabaru Vank, and surrounded by fortifications. It would be destroyed in the 14th century by Timur's army. |

== Sophene ==
| Name | Map | Additional information |
|---|---|---|
| Andzit | | The administrative center of the canton was the fortress of Andzit, which was located southeast of the city of Kharberd, in the area of the present village of Til-Enzit, where the medieval ruins can be seen. It was located in the lower reaches of the Aratsani river and covered most of the Kharberd field. The region was first mentioned in Assyrian and Babylonian inscriptions as Enzitu. It had a mixxed population of Armenians and Syriacs, as well as Urtas, who are believed to be remnants of Hurrians. The royal road from Persia passed through this region and the fortresses of Andzit, Kharberd, and Elegia were located here, as well as the Hrandea palace where a joint Armenian-Parthian army defeated the Romans in 62 AD. The canton was home to the Andzteatsi royal house. Following the partition of Armenia in 387, Andzit became one of the five cantons to fall under Byzantine rule and was known as Anzitene (Greek: Ἀνζιτηνή). |
| Balahovit | | |
| Degik | | |
| Gavrek | | |
| Hashtyank | | |
| Khordzyan | | |
| Lesser Sophene | | |
| Paghnatun | | |

== Syunik ==
| Name | Map | Additional information |
|---|---|---|
| Aghahechk | | |
| Arevik | | |
| Baghk | | |
| Chahuk | | |
| Dzork | | |
| Ghegharkunik | | |
| Haband | | |
| Kovsakan | | |
| Sotk | | |
| Vayots Dzor | | |
| Yernjak | | |

== Tayk ==
| Name | Map | Additional information |
|---|---|---|
| Arsyats Por | | |
| Azordats Por | | |
| Berdats Por | | |
| Boghkha | | |
| Chak | | |
| Kogh | | |
| Partizats Por | | |
| Vokaghe | | |

== Turuberan ==
| Name | Map | Additional information |
|---|---|---|
| Aghiovit | | |
| Apahunik | | |
| Ashmunik | | |
| Aspakunyats Dzor | | |
| Bznunik | | |
| Dalar | | |
| Dasnavork | | |
| Hark | | |
| Khorkhorunik | | |
| Khuyt | | |
| Kor | | |
| Mardaghi | | |
| Taron | | |
| Tvaratsatap | | |
| Varazhnunik | | |
| Yerevark | | |

== Upper Armenia ==
| Name | Map | Additional information |
|---|---|---|
| Aryuts | | |
| Daranaghi | | |
| Derjan | | |
| Karin | | |
| Mananaghi | | |
| Mndzur | | |
| Shaghagomk | | |
| Sper | | |
| Yekeghyats | | |

== Utik ==
| Name | Map | Additional information |
|---|---|---|
| Aghve | | The administrative center of this canton is Kayan Berd. |
| Aran-Rot | | The administrative center was the city of Tigranakert, which was built in the 2nd-1st century B.C. by either Tigranes I or Tigranes the Great on the right bank of the Khachen river. 7th century historians Movses Kaghankatvatsi and Sebeos mentioned the city and existed as a settlement until the late Middle Ages and was located on the territory of the Principality of Khachen. The inner valley of the Khachenaget was called the Tigranakert field, and the name has been preserved as "Tkrakert" by the locals. |
| Gardman | | The domains of the province extended over the Shamkhor river basin and its adjacent territories. The province is also mentioned under the name of Gardmanadzor. According to Tadevos Hakobyan, this province extended in the upper reaches of the Shamkor River. Most of the province is mountainous and forested. Sometimes some authors mistakenly attributed Gardmank province to Artsakh province. There is a famous copper mine in Gardman, which is located on the site of the current city of Gadabay. These copper mines have been used since ancient times, but references to it become frequent only in the 10th-13th centuries. Getabak fortress, mentioned by Armenian chroniclers, is one of the famous places of Gardman province. |
| Shakashen | | The province is also known to us as Shikashen, Shakashen, Shikashen, and Arshakashen. Strabo called the region Sakasene, and is believed that the name originates from the Scythians (Saka). A vast plain belonging to the Kur river. The city of Gandzak is one of the significant historical-geographical places of Shakashen, which was built in the 12th century and in a short period of time became a large and prosperous city. It is located on the western side of Uti Arandznak canton. Ghevond Alishan identifies with the later Gandzak province. Suren Yeremyan places the settlements of Zakam and Kurak in the center of the valley on the right bank of the Kur River. The settlement of Varta was also mentioned in the sources as one of the settlements of Shakashen. In the first half of the 5th century, Sasanian Iran separated Shakashen from Armenia and transferred it to Caucasian Albania province. |
| Rot-Patsyan | | The east most canton of Utik, with the bank of the Arakses. |
| Tri | | The administrative center was the city of Paytakaran. |
| Tuchkatak | | |
| Uti Arandznak | | |

== Vaspurakan ==
| Name | Map | Additional information |
|---|---|---|
| Aghand-Rot | | Mentioned as "Allanda" in Hittite sources. The Aghandrot river flows through this region. Not much else is known about this region. |
| Aghbak Mets | | Today's Başkale. Bordered by Ake to the north and was owned by the Artsrunid dynasty. The Adamakert castle is located here. |
| Aghovit | | Today's Patnos. Not much else is known about this region. |
| Ake | | The name Ake originated from the Akeatsi tribe. Not much else is known about this region. |
| Andzakhi Dzor | | Today's Kodur. The administrative center of the region was the Kotor fortress. |
| Andzevatsik | | |
| Arberani | | Today's Muradiye. The islands of Lim and Ktuts are also a part of this region. The administrative center of this region was Berkri. |
| Archishakovit | | |
| Arnoyotn | | Also known as Arnohotn. Not much else is known about this region. |
| Artashisyan | | Also known as Artavanyan in Ashkharhatsuyts, acted as the temple domain of the settlement. It is also assumed that it served a similar purpose during the Araratian period for the settlement of Tarirakhinili. |
| Artavanyan | | Not much is known about this region. |
| Artaz | | |
| Bakran | | The administrative center of this region was Marand. The settlement of Bakurakert was also located in this region. |
| Bogunik | | |
| Bun Mardastan | | |
| Buzhunik | | Today's Norduz. Located above the upper parts of the Easter Tigris river. Not much else is known about this region. |
| Chvashrot | | |
| Gabityan | | |
| Garni | | |
| Gazrikyan | | |
| Goghtn | | |
| Gukank | | |
| Hayots Dzor | | |
| Koghanovit | | |
| Krchunik | | |
| Mardastan | | |
| Metsnunik | | |
| Nakhchavan | | |
| Palunik | | |
| Parspatunik | | |
| Rshtunik | | |
| Taygryan | | |
| Tornavan | | Located east of Andzakhadzr. The fortresses of Nkan and Sevan are located here. |
| Tosp | | |
| Trpatunik | | |
| Varazhnunik | | |

== See also ==
- Armenian Mesopotamia
- Lesser Armenia
- Commagene
