= Balahovit =

Village in Kotayk, Armenia

Balahovit Բալահովիտ
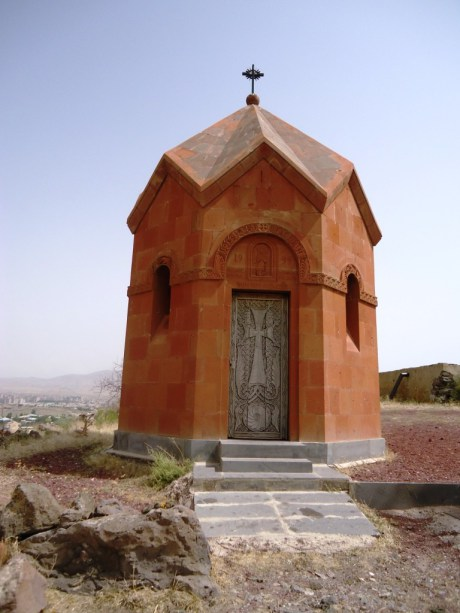

- Location within Armenia
- Coordinates: 40°15′13″N 44°36′14″E
- Country: Armenia
- Marz (Province): Kotayk
- Founded: 1828-29

Government
  - Mayor: Kamo Grigoryan

Area
  - Total: 12.28 km^{2} (4.74 sq mi)

Population (2012)
  - Total: 3,911
  - Density: 318.5/km^{2} (824.9/sq mi)
- Time zone: UTC+4 ( )
  - Summer (DST): UTC+5 ( )

Balahovit (Armenian: Բալահովիտ, also Romanized as Balaovit; formerly until 1968, Mgub, Mekhub, and Mehub) is a village in the Kotayk Province of Armenia. The majority of the early settlers of the village immigrated in 1828-29 from Khoy and Salmast in present-day Iran, while some of the immigrants came from Bulankh. It was renamed Balahovit in 1968 at the request of an Armenian-American group, after one of the eight cantons (gavar) of Sophene in Greater Armenia, of the same name. The community has a school, house of culture, and a first aid station, as well as the site of Yerevan Veterinary Institute's experimental station. Balahovit had a kindergarten, but it was closed in July 2004 due to the deteriorating conditions of the educational facility. The local economy is heavily dependent on agriculture, based primarily on grain farming, orchard cultivation, and cattle-breeding. Balahovit has a small minority of Kurds (including Yazidis) and Russians.

== See also ==
- Kotayk Province
- History of Balahovit
