= Spanduni =

Spanduni was a district of Armenia c. 400–800 and the name of the family that ruled it.

== See also ==
- List of regions of ancient Armenia
