= Antzitene =

Region of medieval Armenia

Coordinates: 38°21′19″N 38°20′01″E

Antzitene or Anzitene (Old Armenian: Անձիտ Anjit, Greek: Ἀνζιτηνή) was a region of the medieval Armenia c. 300–1000, known in Armenian as Hanzith and in Syriac as Hanzit. Today it lies in Turkey.

From 384, it formed one of the satrapies of Roman Armenia, before becoming part of the new province of Armenia IV in 536. In the 10th century the rulers were Habel (c. 970) and Sahak (c. 995).

Located at the southwestern corner of Armenia, it was bordered by the Arsanias river on the north, the Euphrates on the west, and the slopes of the Armenian Taurus on the south and southeast. The geographic core of Anzitene was the plains region stretching from modern-day Elazığ to the ancient city of Arsamosata. Now called Altınova, or "golden plain", this is a fertile and well-watered region surrounded by mountains. According to a local tradition recorded in the 19th century, it was the site of the ancient Garden of Eden. Anzitene also included areas on the east bank of the Euphrates, around Muşar and Tomisa (Kömür Han), in what is geographically part of the Malatya plain instead.

Anzitene controlled the southern of the two main east-west routes through the Armenia. The first one went from Melitene in the west, crossed the Euphrates at Tomisa, and then followed the Arsanias valley up to its headwaters in the lava country north of Lake Van. It also commanded the Ergani Pass - one of two main routes over the Armenian Taurus, linking the Armenian plateau with the rich upper Tigris valley. It also controlled several lesser-important routes. One went northwest towards northern Anatolia, crossing the Arsanias at the Aşvan ford and then the Euphrates near Ağın. Another went north to the upper Euphrates valley, crossing the Arsanias at the Pertek ford and then crossing the high, bare Mouzouron range.

Given its strategic position, Anzitene was often contested between major empires during late antiquity and the early middle ages. It was just beyond the Roman Empire's frontier on the Euphrates until 297, when it was annexed by Diocletian. It then formed a buffer zone protecting Roman Melitene and also controlled the Romans' main north-south military route in the region (the Ergani Pass) until Justinian extended Roman rule further east up the Arsanias valley. Then, after the Arab conquest, Anzitene became part a staging point for expeditions against Asia Minor and to control southwestern Armenia. Anzitene was reconquered by the Byzantines in the 930s and they fortified the city of Harput which now rose to prominence and became the main city in the region. Not long after, the Hamdanid ruler Sayf al-Dawla made a famous raid into Anzitene in 956. This was one of his most famous campaigns, and the "remarkably detailed" Arabic prose account of it provides a major source about medieval Anzitene and its settlement patterns.

Classical Anzitene was a prosperous region; its main towns were Dadima (Tadım) and Arsamosata, while many villages dotted the surrounding countryside. However, during the middle ages, Anzitene's population appears to have decreased - its location on the frontier during the Arab-Byzantine wars left it vulnerable to attack, and many people migrated north to the relatively more secure district of Sophene.

Today, the construction of the Keban Dam has flooded low-lying parts of old Anzitene along the Arsanias valley, hindering archaeological research of sites there.

== History ==
The name Anzitene corresponds to the Enzi of Neo-Assyrian texts.

A document dated to 252 about the sale of a slave named Qardannaea Diane identifies her as being born in the district of Ortene, which based on later Syriac sources appears to be located in Anzitene. The people of Ortene apparently spoke neither Armenian nor Aramaic but rather their own language. (The name "Ortene" has been connected by Markwart to ancient Urartu but this is highly speculative.) However, the fact that Qardannaea had also adopted the name Diane in addition to her native name indicates that the region was under considerable Greco-Roman cultural influence at the time.

In 298, the principality of Anzitene became a Roman subject. As a vassal of the kingdom of Armenia, the princes of Anzitene held the hereditary office of hazarapet, perhaps roughly corresponding to a chancellor, for a few generations. They were one of the more important nakharar families (compared to Ingilene which was relatively less important). With the treaty of 363, the kingdom of Armenia changed sides to the Persians, while Anzitene and Sophene remained under Roman allegiance. The prince of Anzitene in 363 when the Persians took over Armenia was named Sałamut. The Armenian sources portray Anzitene and Sophene siding with the Romans as treason against the Armenian king, but in reality Anzitene had already been under Roman influence for over 50 years.

After Arab Melitene surrendered to the Byzantines in 934, Anzitene became briefly divided. Its western highlands abutting Melitene were absorbed into Byzantine territory, forming part of the frontier theme of Mesopotamia, which straddled the Mouzouron range. Eastern Anzitene wasn't taken until 937, and then Arsamosata was besieged from 937 to 939. The Byzantines probably expanded the fortifications at Harput around this time. From this point on, Harput became the main center in Anzitene.

Over the next 10 years, the Byzantines continued to expand further east so that by 950, the frontier was well to the east of Anzitene. However, Anzitene vulnerable to attack from across the Armenian Taurus to the south. In 956, the Hamdanid ruler of Aleppo, Sayf al-Dawla, led that exact type of attack into Anzitene. This is one of his most famous campaigns, and the "remarkably detailed" Arabic prose account of it provides a major source about medieval Anzitene and its settlement patterns. This account is found in some manuscripts preceding al-Mutanabbi's two poems about the campaign and probably is based on, or directly copied from, an official Hamdanid bulletin sent out by Sayf al-Dawla and/or his military staff who may have recorded the campaign.

The population of Anzitene appears to have declined between the 6th and 10th centuries. Tadım, the late Roman capital of Anzitene, had shrunk and retreated to a more defensible location. Harput also appears to have done the same. The only exception to this trend was Hūrī, which seems to have grown from a village into a town. Part of the reason for this decline may have been because of a movement of population northwards into Sophene. What likely happened is that during the Arab invasions, many people left the "open, exposed settlements" on the Anzitene plain for better-protected places in Sophene. As a "fissured limestone country" protected on the south by the Arsanias river, Sophene was better positioned to shield residents from raids and invasions.

A local population shift also took place within Anzitene, as the people who remained in the district left the open and exposed settlements on the plains for more elevated sites that offered protection. However, there is no evidence that an internal migration took place from the plains to the highlands of western Anzitene. In contrast to Sophene, whose valleys were small but had rich soil for agriculture, the western Anzitene highlands are poorly suited to support large towns.

Meanwhile, the threat of the Byzantines to the west prompted the Arabs to invest in fortifying the northern and western highlands of Anzitene, such as at al-Minşār, al-Tell, and Aşvan. They didn't bother to make any bases on the open plains, except for the major city of Arsamosata at the eastern end of the plain.

The Arabs don't seem to have used the Ergani pass much during this period. However, an account of Basil I's campaign in the region in 873 refers to fortified settlements at include Chachon (Aşağı Huh) and Mourinix (the fort at Daldık, near the village of Murenik), among others. Both sites are on the descent from the Ergani pass, indicating that it was still seen as a strategic military objective, even if less than other periods. In general, the Arabs used Anzitene for a different strategic purpose than supplying Malatya - they used it to maintain communications with regions further east.

When the Byzantines reconquered the region, they made little changes except for upgrading the fortifications at Harput, which now became the main stronghold in Anzitene. They simply reused the existing Arab system, adapting it to serve as a base for the guerilla strategies they typically favored. The resulting system was very defensive in nature, with the castles all at "strong vantage points on the far side of the plain, as if their main function was to shield a highland refuge zone in the west and to control the strategic routes, the main river fords, and the western approach to Arsamosata." They were not designed to protect the plain. They also didn't fortify the Hazar Gölü valley or the mountains separating it from the main Anzitene plain. The Byzantines seem to have treated Anzitene as "a deep outer defensive zone" protecting Melitene on the west and the canton of Sophene, "the economic and social heart of the province of Mesopotamia", to the north.

Later, Anzitene formed the core of the Artukid principality of Harput, which also extended further east. This principality was initially established shortly after 1090 by a separate Turkish emir named Çubuk, under the authority of the Seljuk statesman Ibn Jahir. In 1113, Çubuk's son Mehmet lost the principality to an Artukid named Balak, who then in turn was conquered by a different Artukid, Shams ad-Dawla of Mayyafariqin. The next year, Harput was seized by a third Artukid, Dawud of Hisn Kayfa. In 1176, a younger son of this branch seized Harput and it became an independent principality again until its final conquest by the Seljuk Kayqubad I in 1234. The principality of Harput had not originally included the western part of Anzitene around Minshar, but when Balak married the mother of Tuğrul Arslan, the neighboring Seljuk prince of Malatya, he received Minshar as his dowry and thus reunited Anzitene politically.

== Places ==
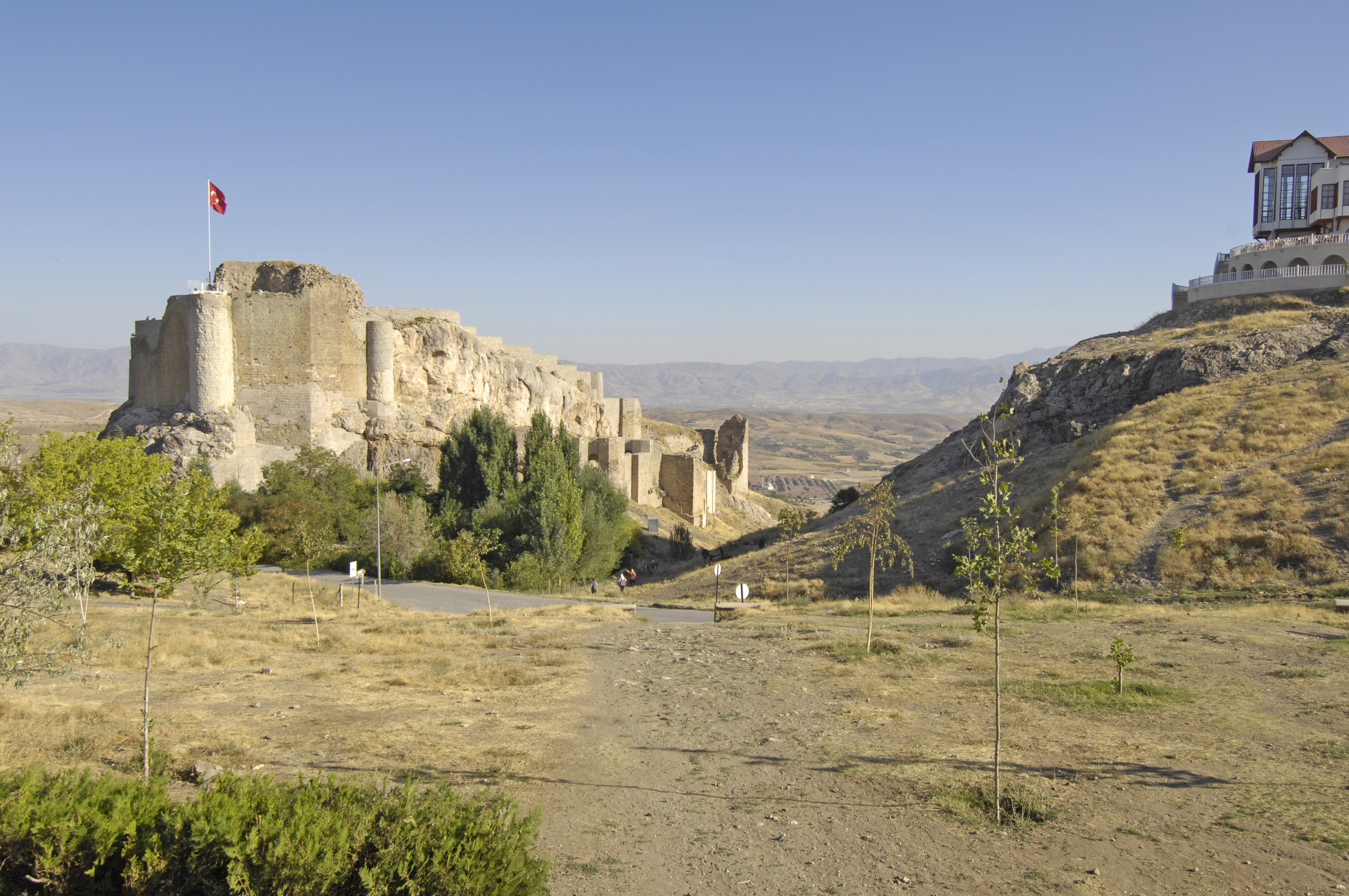
The castle of Harput occupies a powerful defensive position overlooking the Altınova plain.

Although it was the region's main settlement for much of the middle ages, Harput (aka Ziata) was an obscure, purely local stronghold throughout the classical and early medieval periods. Its only claim to fame was that in 359 it was the most important among several minor forts captured by a Persian expedition into Roman territory. It played no major role in the Roman-Sasanian wars of late antiquity, nor in the Arab conquest. It was "not incorporated into the elaborate system of frontier defense laid out by the caliph Harun al-Rashid at the end of the 8th century". Even as late as Qudama ibn Ja'far's systematic account of the Arab marches facing Byzantium between 928 and 932 it was unmentioned and must have remained purely local in importance. It seems to have first gained significance when the Byzantines conquered Anzitene in the 930s. During the early middle ages, Harput shrank in size. From its larger Roman-era site, with ten-stadia-long circuit walls, it "contracted and perhaps retreated to the powerful position occupied by the medieval castle". In the 10th century, the fortress was expanded to its present size. From this point on, Harput became the main center in Anzitene and the surrounding region in general. Its population grew as the threat of warfare, Turkic raids, and brigandage drove many people to seek safety near its formidable castle.

The main castle apart from Harput in 10th-century Anzitene was Dadima (or Dadimon), at present-day Tadım. It was an important military objective of Sayf al-Dawla's campaigns of 938 and 956. This castle was the medieval descendant of an important ancient settlement. George of Cyprus, writing in the late 6th century, appears to implicitly label Dadima a city since he does not list it as either a fortress (kastron) or a town (polichne). He also implies that it had recently been elevated to the provincial capital of Armenia IV, succeeding Martyropolis, the capital under Justinian, after the southern flanks of the Armenian Taurus were detached and made into the new province of Upper Mesopotamia. Dadima remained the ecclesiastical capital of Armenia IV at least through 692, when its bishop Elias signed the canons of the Quinisext Council.

During the period of Arab domination roughly lasting from 640-938, Tadım declined to a small town, leaving Arsamosata the lone major city in the plains region. The reason may have been proximity to danger, with the Arab-Byzantine frontier now lying west of Tadım. Some of its population likely relocated to the Arsamosata area. Sometime after 956, Tadım sank into total obscurity, although its name survives to the present day. As of 1900, remains at Tadım include two traces of circuit walls: one enclosing a tepe 60 feet high, possibly representing the medieval site, and the other 1 mile west on the plain, possibly representing the ancient site.

Some 8 km south of Tadım is Hoh, which as of the 19th century was one of the principal villages on the plain. As of 1900, foundations of an apparently "Roman" or "Byzantine" building were identified atop a tepe 80 feet high and 200 feet in diameter; the tepe was apparently unfortified. Hoh is probably the place called Hūrī in the al-Mutanabbi account. (This was first proposed by Canard and accepted by Howard-Johnston "for want of convincing alternatives - but with considerable hesitation".) Although it is listed as a balad or city in the text, it was probably obscure in both classical and medieval times and was probably just a particularly large village, probably unfortified according to Howard-Johnston. On the other hand, Sinclair identifies the site of Aşağı Huh with the fort called "Chachon" that Basil I attacked in 873. In any case, it was probably fortified earlier in its history, since the Armenian Geography attributed to Moses of Chorene in the 6th or 7th century lists a castle called Horē as one of two places in Anzitene canton.

Arsamosata in the northeast was a major city with a mixed Armenian and Assyrian population. It was located at the present-day site of Haraba. The Syriac Orthodox bishop of Anzitene resided at Arsamosata. Tadım's decline under Arab rule left Arsamosata as the lone major city in the plains region. Arsamosata likely received an influx of new residents from both Tadım and the Malatya plain. Around the 11th and 12th centuries, however, Arsamosata went into decline, contracting from "a sprawling ancient city" into a smaller city contained within the walls. It remained a city until at least the end of the 12th century - the Syrian Orthodox bishopric is known until 1199 - and was probably inside the old city walls, although not effectively protected by them. After the local garrison was finally withdrawn, perhaps in 1234 when Harput was conquered by the Seljuks, Arsamosata's population "dispersed to villages on the plain and nearby hills".

Other than Arsamosata, the castle of Salām was probably the only major site in the northeastern part of Anzitene at Sayf al-Dawla's time. A possible identification is the large stronghold of Shitar Kale near İçme, which overlooks the plain from a height of 1000 feet and commands the Arsanias valley. Along with the village of al-Muqaddamiyyah, Salām lay on Sayf al-Dawla's route from Harput to Arsamosata in 938. The poet Abu Firas refers to a battle "in the district of Salām" at one point, implying that Sayf al-Dawla's victory over the pursuing Byzantines took place near here.

Sayf al-Dawla never targeted the highlands of northern and western Anzitene, "doubtless deterred by the danger of Byzantine guerrilla action in favorable terrain", so less is known about this area during the 10th century. Only 3 castles are mentioned in 10th-century sources: Aşvan, al-Tell, and al-Minşār. The castle at Aşvan apparently put up no resistance to Sayf al-Dawla's forces in 956 - they occupied it without trouble and turned it into a base camp. It stood on the south bank of the Arsanias, at a convenient place for launching boats and rafts, and it controlled a ford. One candidate for its location is the mound called Aşvan Kale above the modern village of Aşvan: it is on the river bank, 4 km upstream from a major ford, and the name is identical. However, excavation of the northern half of the mound revealed no evidence of occupation between c. 400-1000 - nor any indication that the site was ever fortified during its occupation. Instead, according to James Howard-Johnston, the castle, along with the ancient and medieval town, was probably somewhere on the plain just to the west, immediately by the ford. Here, it would have been better positioned to guard the southern approach to ford on the road from Harput than the more defensible but distant mound above the present-day village. Alluvial action and human quarrying may have removed all visible traces of an early medieval castle. (However, according to Stephen Mitchell's hypothesis, there was never a castle of "Hisn Aşvan" - rather, there was just a mound called "castle" in the 10th century just the same as it is today.)

Al-Tell castle was probably in the hills west of Tadım, probably no more than 10 km or so away. Sayf al-Dawla sent a detachment to siege al-Tell in 938 while he was besieging Dadima. Canard proposed that al-Tell is the same place as the Tell Arsanas mentioned by Ibn Hawqal; this is accepted by Howard-Johnston "for want of convincing alternatives - but with considerable hesitation".) The exact location is uncertain, but the coordinates Ibn Hawqal gave for Tell Arsanas would place it about 18 km west of Harput and about 24 km from the Euphrates ford at the village of Hammam. Tell Arsanas would have overlooked the main route southwest from Harput towards the ford at Tomisa. If al-Tell was indeed here, then Sayf al-Dawla's actions here would have been intended to hold the route and perhaps provide a distraction from his main actions at Tadım and Harput.

The castle of al-Minşār was almost certainly at the large rock by the village of Kale on the mountain called Muşer or Mişar Dağ near the east bank of the Euphrates. This site "had been fashioned into a castle by hewing out platforms and steps and constructing walls in the prehistoric period". The site is just upstream from a ford on the Euphrates - itself upstream from the main one at Tomisa - which was used by Sayf al-Dawla in 953 to make a rapid retreat when his forces were almost trapped on the opposite bank. There was presumably a minor route running through the Anzitene highlands that he used then.

4 km south-southeast of modern-day Aşvan is the late medieval castle of Taşkun Kale, which is on the northern edge of an upland basin. Anthony McNicoll tentatively dated Taşkun Kale castle and the medieval phase of its nearby church to 14th century and concluded that the settlement around it must have been fairly large given the presence of scattered potsherds and traces of stone walls. The name "Taşkun" is vaguely reminiscent of the ancient Roman border fort of Dascusa - as does the nearby city of al-Ashkūniyyah, a provincial capital across the river from Aşvan.

There is a small castle on a small hill overlooking the village of Keluşağı 12 km west of Tell Arsanas; it should probably be distinguished from al-Tell. It commands a second, more minor route west from Harput which is north of the main one. Based on local accounts of Roman coins being washed out from the spring rains, Huntington assigned this site to the Roman period. It may have also remained in use during the early middle ages.

The ancient settlement of Mazara, whose site is now occupied by the modern city of Elazığ, was a road station on the road linking Melitene to the upper Euphrates basin. After the classical period, it no longer appears in historical records, indicating that it declined to insignificance or was abandoned altogether. A large settlement at the mouth of the Zerteriç valley appears to have been built at some point during classical antiquity. It does not seem to have featured in Sayf al-Dawla's campaigns and may have dwindled to a village or been abandoned altogether by the 10th century.

The town of Kalkas mentioned by Ibn Hawqal, which corresponds to the ancient Cholcis, was at the NE end of Hazar Gölü. When Sayf al-Dawla invaded through here in 956, the account makes no mention of him dealing with any Byzantine stronghold, so Kalkas does not appear to have been used as a military base during this period.

== See also ==
- List of regions of ancient Armenia

== Bibliography ==
- Howard-Johnston, James (2006). East Rome, Sasanian Persia and the End of Antiquity. Ashgate. ISBN 0-86078-992-6.
- Marciak, Michał (2017). Sophene, Gordyene, and Adiabene: Three Regna Minora of Northern Mesopotamia Between East and West. Brill. ISBN 9789004350724.
- Sinclair, T.A. (1989). Eastern Turkey: An Architectural & Archaeological Survey, Volume III. Pindar Press. ISBN 0907132340.
