= Eru =

Eru or ERU may refer to:

== People ==
- Eru (singer) (born 1983), Korean singer
- Eru Kapa-Kingi (born 1996), New Zealand Māori activist
- Eru Potaka-Dewes (1939–2009), New Zealand actor
- Syd Eru (born 1971), New Zealand rugby player

== Other uses ==
- Eru (soup), a Cameroonian soup
- Eru (vegetable), a tropical African vine and vegetable
- Eru, Estonia, village in Haljala Parish, Lääne-Viru County, Estonia
  - Eru Bay, bay near the village
- Egyptian Russian University, in Badr, Egypt
- Emergency response unit
- Emission Reduction Unit, under the Joint Implementation of the Kyoto Protocol
- Equilibrium rate of unemployment in macroeconomic theory
- Equine recurrent uveitis, a horse disease
- Eru Ilúvatar, name for God in J. R. R. Tolkien's Middle-earth legendarium
- Yery, a letter of the Cyrillic alphabet
- Eru, a character in the manga series Shugo Chara!
