= Degik =

Canton in the ancient Kingdom of Armenia

Degik was a canton of the province of Sophene in the ancient Kingdom of Armenia. It was located between the Euphrates river and the town of Çemişgezek. It had three prominent fortified settlements, Qruik, Mok, and Krni. It passed from Armenian rule to the Eastern Roman Empire, then to Arab-ruled Arminiya. The local Armenian prince Manuel handed Degik over to the Byzantine emperor Leo VI (r. 886–912) and was gifted land in the Pontic region. A number of the Armenian villages in the region united with the Byzantine church and became Chalcedonian, adopting the Byzantine rite while still using the Armenian language for their liturgy. Their descendants became the Hayhurum of the Çemişgezek region. The region then passed on to Seljuk rule, under Ottoman rule the region experienced Islamization.
