= Sophene =

Province of the ancient kingdom of Armenia

Sophene Ծոփք Provincia Sophene
- Province of the ancient kingdom of Armenia
- c. 95 BC–299 AD
- Sophene (here spelled Dsopk) in the south-west of the Kingdom of Armenia
- History
  - Annexation by Tigranes II: c. 95 BC
  - Transfer to Roman rule: 299 AD

Sophene (Armenian: Ծոփք, romanized: Tsopkʻ or Չորրորդ Հայք, lit. 'fourth Armenia'; Ancient Greek: Σωφηνή, romanized: Sōphēnē) was a province of the ancient kingdom of Armenia, located in the south-west of the kingdom, and of the Roman Empire. The region lies in what is now southeastern Turkey.

== History ==
The region that was to become Sophene was the site of a land called Ṣuppa, also known as Išuwa to the Hittites. Ṣuppa became part of the kingdom of Urartu in the last quarter of the 9th century BC. Most scholars concur that Sophene formed part of the Satrapy of Armenia in the Achaemenid period. During and after the Achaemenid period, Armenia was ruled by the Orontids, a dynasty of Iranian origin descended from Orontes I (died 344 BC). The Orontids maintained their control over Armenia after the conquest of the Achaemenid Empire by Alexander the Great in 330 BCE, effectively ruling Armenia as kings. During the Hellenistic period, Sophene may have been more under the control of the Seleucids while the Orontids maintained control over the eastern regions of Armenia. Most likely in the mid-3rd century BC, the Orontid dynasty split into several branches, with one branch establishing itself as rulers of Sophene. (Note: One scholar writes that this occurred in the context of the decline of Seleucid power in the Near East, while another states that it was the result of a rebellion supported by the Seleucids.)

According to the Greek author Strabo, after the rule of the last Orontes of Armenia the Seleucid king Antiochus III (r. 222–187 BC) appointed his generals Zariadres and Artaxias to Sophene and Greater Armenia, respectively. Other evidence indicates that Zariades and Artaxias, who may have been father and son or otherwise close relatives, (Note: Scholars have expressed differing views on whether Zariadres, ruler of Sophene, should be identified with the zrytr or zryhr whom Artaxias I names as his father in his Aramaic-language inscriptions. According to Marciak, identifying Zariadres with the father of Artaxias mentioned in the inscriptions seems to be "the most straightforward interpretation". Facella writes that it is uncertain whether Zariadres should be identified with Artaxias I's father and that, if this is the case, then Zariadres "might also have claimed a kinship with the Orontid house".) were not foreign generals but rather members of the Orontid dynasty, albeit probably belonging to different lines than the previous Orontid rulers. Branches of the earlier Orontid house apparently survived in Sophene and elsewhere. After Antiochus III's defeat by the Romans in 190, Zariadres took the royal title and became entirely independent from the Seleucids, as did Artaxias in Greater Armenia. Their independence was recognized in the Peace of Apamea of 188 BC, which, however, left Commagene, which may have been part of the Kingdom of Sophene, under Seleucid control. Later in the 2nd century BCE, a separate kingdom of Commagene ruled by an Orontid line emerged.

The Kingdom of Sophene survived under Zariadres' successors until about 95 BCE, when it was conquered and its king deposed by King Tigranes II of Greater Armenia. However, Tigranes II lost control over Sophene c. 69 BCE during his war with Rome. According to the Greek author Plutarch, the population of Sophene welcomed the invading Roman army. After Tigranes II was defeated by the Romans, Pompey installed Tigranes' son Tigranes the Younger as ruler of Sophene, but he soon had a dispute with the Romans and was removed. It is debated whether after 66 BCE Sophene came back under Greater Armenian control or became a part of Cappadocia (as reported by the Greco-Roman historian Appian). According to some scholars, in the 1st century AD Sophene and Lesser Armenia were ruled together by the Roman client-king Cotys. In 54 AD, Sohaemus of Emesa was appointed King of Sophene by Nero, although it is unlikely that he ever actually ruled there.

Sophene may have been officially ceded back to Greater Armenia after the Treaty of Rhandeia of 63 AD; nevertheless, Roman garrisons appear to have remained in Sophene. Pointing to Sophene's strategic importance and Greater Armenia's status as a decentralized state, historian Michał Marciak writes, "it may not be incorrect to see Sophene as a region with its own local elites who, depending on the political situation in the region, leaned more towards Rome, Greater Armenia, or Parthia, or perhaps enjoyed brief periods of autonomy." Everett L. Wheeler describes the situation as one of "dual sovereignty", in which the nobles of Sophene (which in fact consisted of several subdivisions) had their own cliental arrangements with Rome while retaining their status as princes within Greater Armenia. This situation was formalized, but not created by, the Treaty of Nisibis in 299 AD, by which several southern districts of Armenia which once formed part of the Kingdom of Sophene, were recognized as civitates foederatae liberae et immunes, i.e. internally autonomous territories which coordinated their foreign policy with Rome. In 536, Sophene was included into the province of Armenia IV.

== Geography and administration ==
In the 7th-century Armenian geography called the Ashkharhatsuyts, Sophene (more frequently called Chorrord Hayk 'Fourth Armenia' in the text) is placed to the south of Upper Armenia and to the east of Melitene (modern-day Malatya), on the left bank of the Euphrates (which formed Sophene's border), and to the north of Mesopotamia and west of the province of Taron or Turuberan. The Ashkharhatsuyts names eight districts within Sophene: Khordzean, Hashteank, Pałnatun, Balahovit, Tsopk, Handzit, Gawrek, and Degik. Suren Yeremian calculated the total area of Sophene as described in the Ashkharhatsuyts to be 15,890 km^{2} (6,140 sq mi).

The eight districts of Sophene were divided between five principalities: 1) Greater Sophene or Sophanene (Armenian: Tsopk Mets); 2) Lesser Sophene (Pokr Tsopk or Tsopk Shahuni); 3) Ingilene-Anzitene (Angł-tun / Handzit); 4) Asthianene (Hashteank); and 5) Balabitene (Balahovit). The first three principalities passed to Rome in 299, and the other two in about 371. Under Justinian I, the five heads of the principalities were demoted to the status of private citizens with large estates, which were soon broken up due to the application of Roman inheritance law. In 536, the five principalities were combined into a single province of Armenia IV (Armenia Quarta, Fourth Armenia), which was governed by a consul sitting in Martyropolis. Territorial changes were made to the province after the Byzantine–Sasanian partition of Armenia in 591 and again before the arrival of the Arabs in 636.

The kings of Armenia had royal treasuries and fortresses in Sophene. Cyril Toumanoff, following Josef Markwart, identifies Sophene as the domain of one of the four bdeashkhs (Latin: vitaxae) of the Kingdom of Armenia. The bdeashkhs were high-ranking nobles responsible for defending the border regions of the Kingdom of Armenia. Robert H. Hewsen argues on the contrary that there was no vitaxa of Sophene; the Romans would not have tolerated an Armenian military viceroyalty right on the Roman–Armenian frontier. Hewsen states that defense of western Armenia (Sophene in its broadest sense) was apparently the responsibility of the royal official known as the Hayr Tagawori (Grand Chamberlain).

== Population ==
Sophene's population in antiquity was diverse, including both Armenians and Syrians. Strabo indicates that the conquests of Zariadres and Artaxias in the 2nd century BC caused the population of Sophene and Greater Armenia to "speak the same language", i.e. Armenian. The 6th-century author John of Ephesus attests to the presence in Sophene of a people called Urta who spoke neither Armenian nor Aramaic. Josef Markwart thought that this group was a remnant of the Urartians, but according to Marciak this is "very unclear". Marciak writes that there is evidence, especially in local toponyms, of a pre-Hellenistic, Anatolian cultural element in Sophene and that the population of the area in Hellenistic and Roman times could have been, "to some extent", a continuation of the pre-Hellenistic element. (Note: According to Igor M. Diakonoff, the Upper Euphrates valley, where Sophene was located, was inhabited by a "mixed Proto-Armenian-Luwian-Hurrian population" in the 8th century BCE, which by that time was already speaking Proto-Armenian as a second or possibly main language.) Against the view that the population of Sophene was ethnically Armenian, Marciak cites Plutarch's report that the population of Sophene reacted positively to the arrival of the Romans who were campaigning against Tigranes II in 69 BCE. Additionally, per Marciak the use of the terms gentes and ethnes ('peoples') by Greco-Roman authors to refer to the principalities of Sophene demonstrates the cultural and ethnic distinctness of the inhabitants of those territories and even suggests such distinctions among the inhabitants themselves. Hewsen tentatively suggests that the use of gentes and ethnes in this context is connected with the Armenian term for a noble family in its capacity as a lasting historical clan, azg, which can also mean 'nation', 'tribe', or 'people'. Armenians lived in the territory of Sophene in subsequent eras until the Armenian genocide in 1915.

== Gallery ==
Map showing Sophene right as it became a province of the ancient kingdom of Armenia under Tigranes the Great

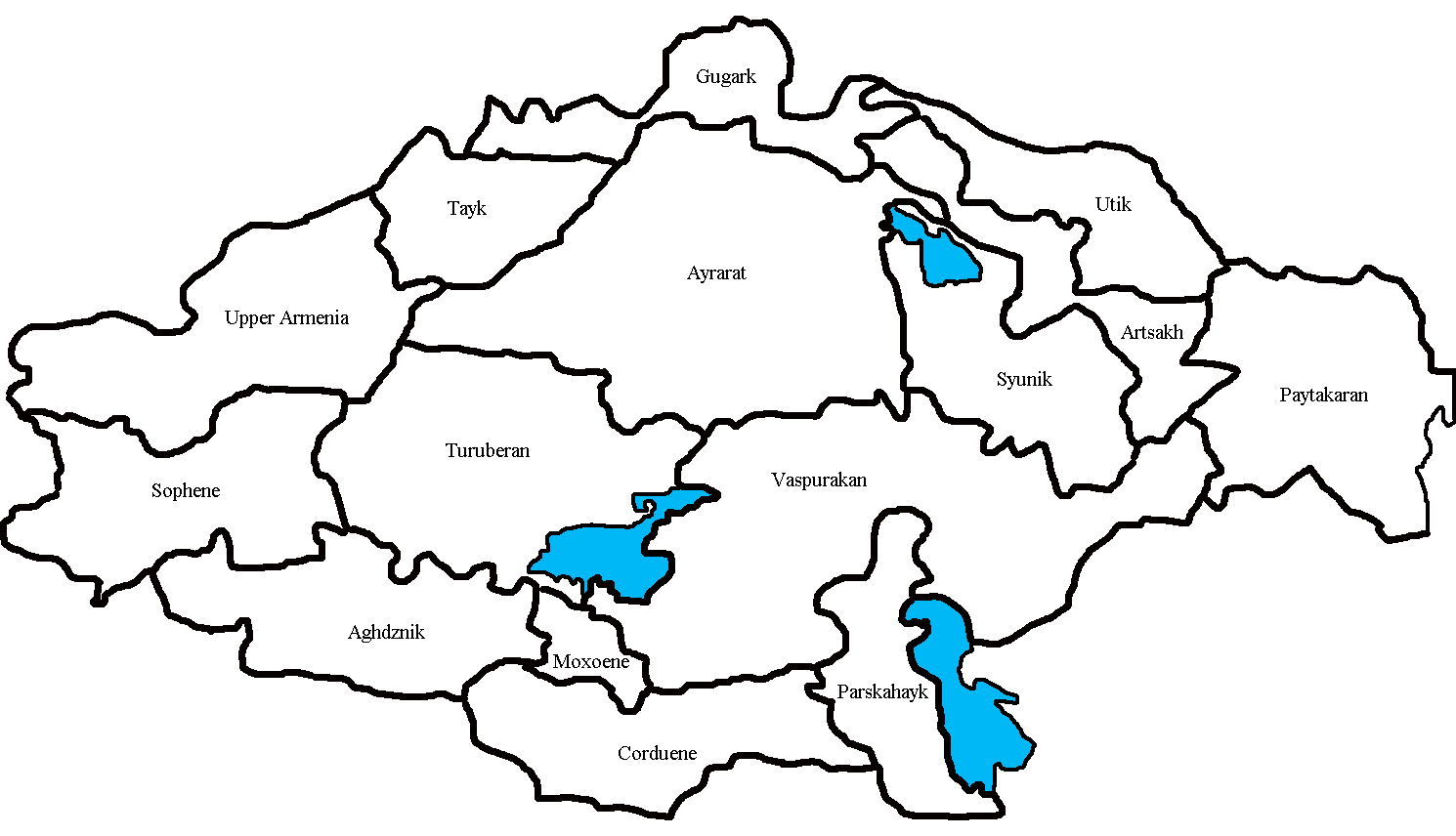
Sophene and the other provinces of the ancient kingdom of Armenia

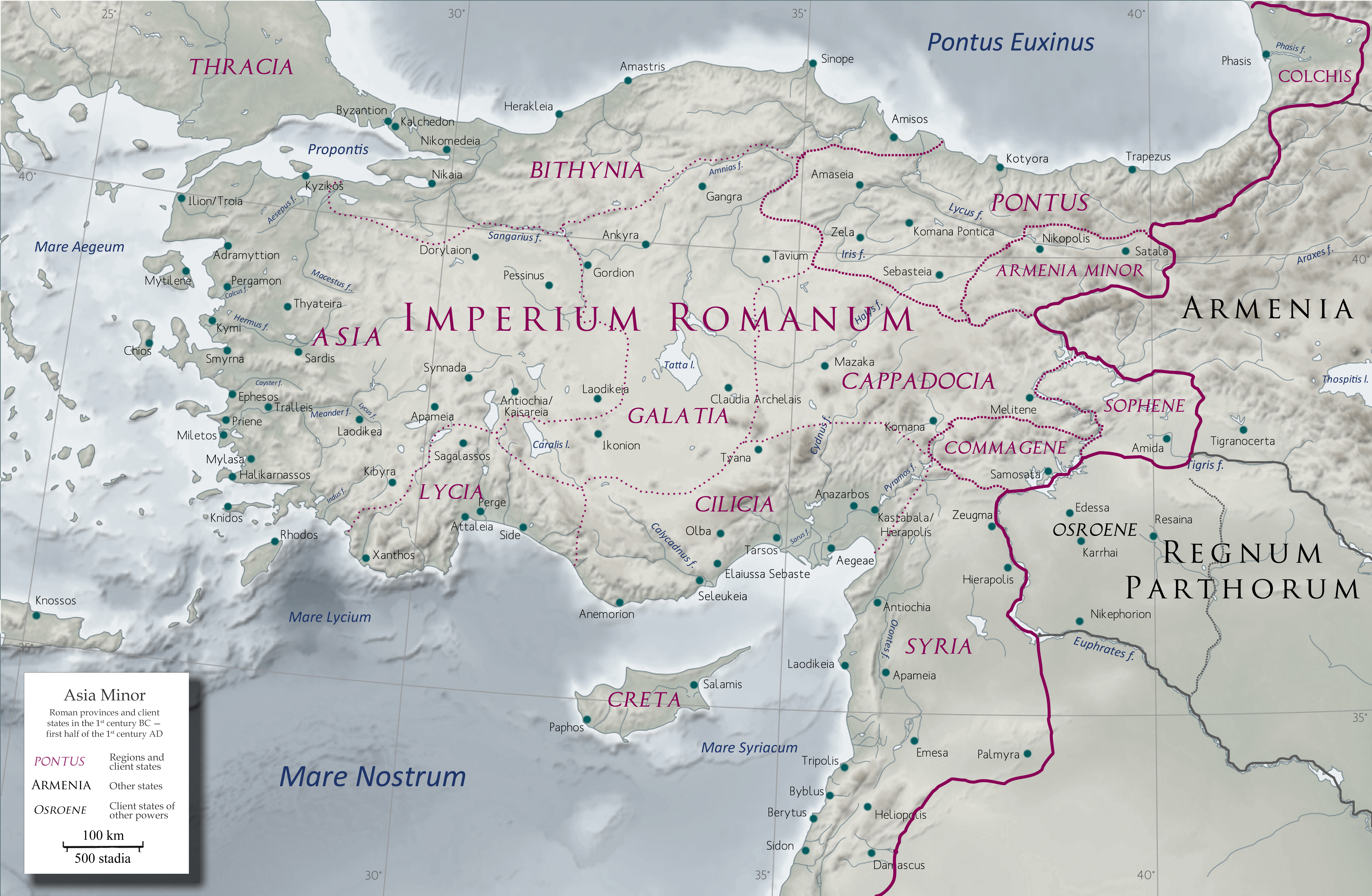
Anatolia in the early 1st century AD with Commagene as a Roman client state

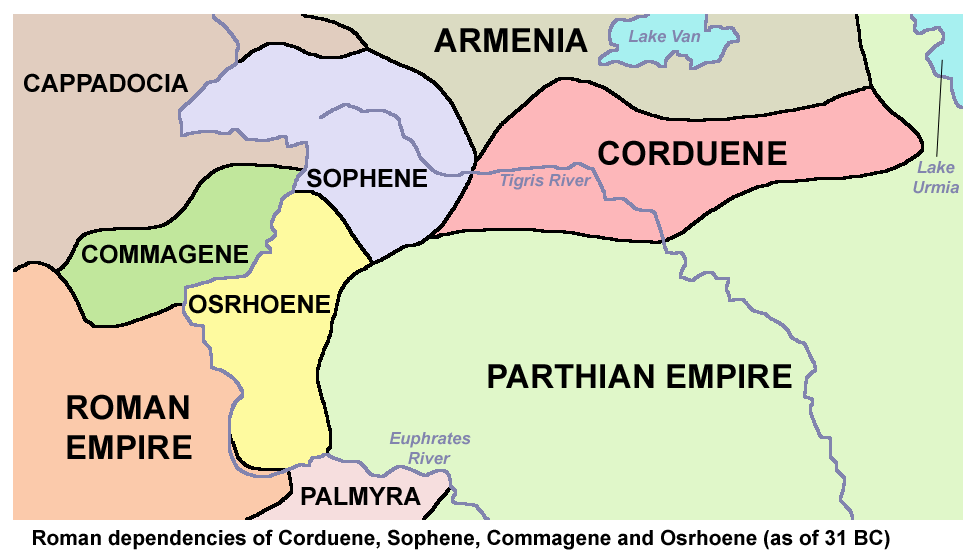
Roman dependency of Sophene (as of 31 BC)

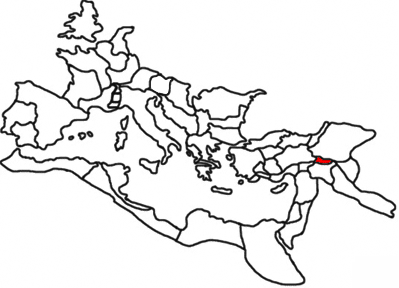
Roman province of Sophene in the year 120

== See also ==
- Degik
- Harpoot
- Tsov language
