= Kayan Berd =

Coordinates: 41.095388°N 44.699137°E

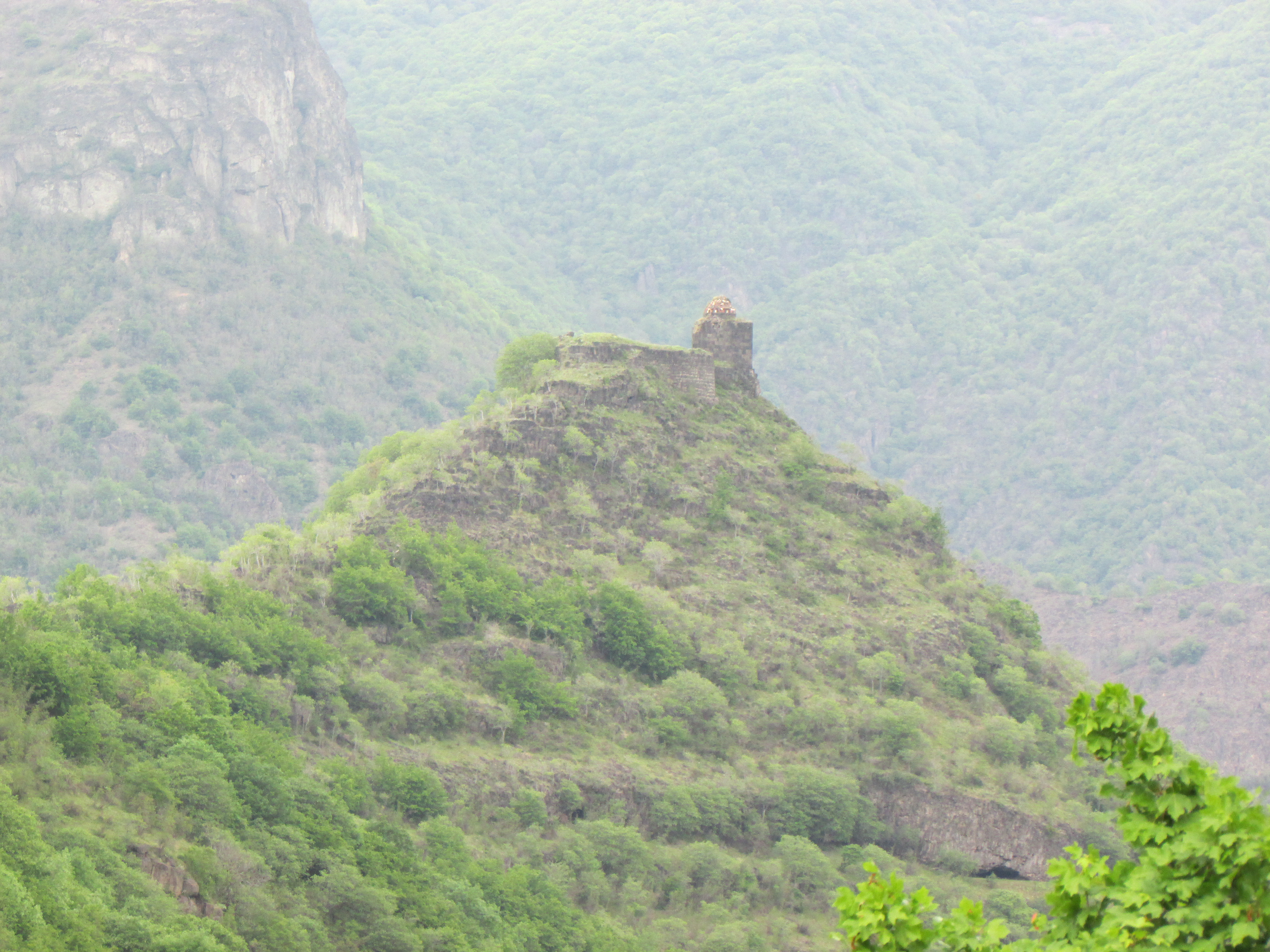
A photograph of Kayan Berd from 2016

Kayan Berd (also known as Kayanberd or Dsevank, Կայանբերդ or Դսեվանք) is a fortress and a former monastery of the Armenian Apostolic Church in the province of Lori in Northern Armenia.

== Lage ==
The Berd lies between the monasteries Haghpat and Sanahin. The Kayan Berd was strategically built at the edge of the ridge between two canyons above the Debed River.

== Specifications ==
The exact year of construction of the castle is unknown. It was possible that King Ashot II. Yerkat built it at some point in the 10th century. The castle is largely destroyed. The wall ring is enclosed by a triangular area and was provided by semi-circular defense towers. Inside the area, the Church Surb Astvatzatzin remained (Սուրբ Աստվածածին, "Holy God Mother"), Western Armenian Surp Asdwadsadsin, other transcriptions Surp Astvatsatsin, Surb Astuacacin) of Dsevank. It was built of black tuff. Its blue, red, white dome was damaged in an earthquake in 1827. The dome was built in the right corner of the fortress, with which it shares an outer wall. One can also see in the vicinity numerous ruins of houses, cisterns and water pipes made of clay. In the associated village, there is a burial ground from the Early Iron Age.

== Story ==
In the middle of the 11th century the Haghpat of the religious center of Lori was built and it competed with the brother monastery Sanahin. According to the medieval historian Kirakos Gandzaketsi, the Archbishop of Haghpat, Hovhannes, built the fortress in 1233 as a monastery with massive defensive walls on Sanahin soil. He came from the Georgian-Armenian Zakarid dynasty and was a son of the sister of the Armenian princes Zakare and Ivane Zakarian. The plant was initially named Monastery Surb Nshan. Surp Nschan (Armenian Holy Sign) is a saint name. The terms Dsevank and Kayan Berd or Kayanberd are of more recent origin.

The situation on Sanahin soil led to a conflict between the two monasteries. After the bishop's death, the Tatars demolished the walls of the monastery in 1241. Subsequently, it was restored and destroyed by troops of Timur at the end of the 14th century; it was not rebuilt afterwards.

== See also ==
- List of castles in Armenia

== Gallery ==
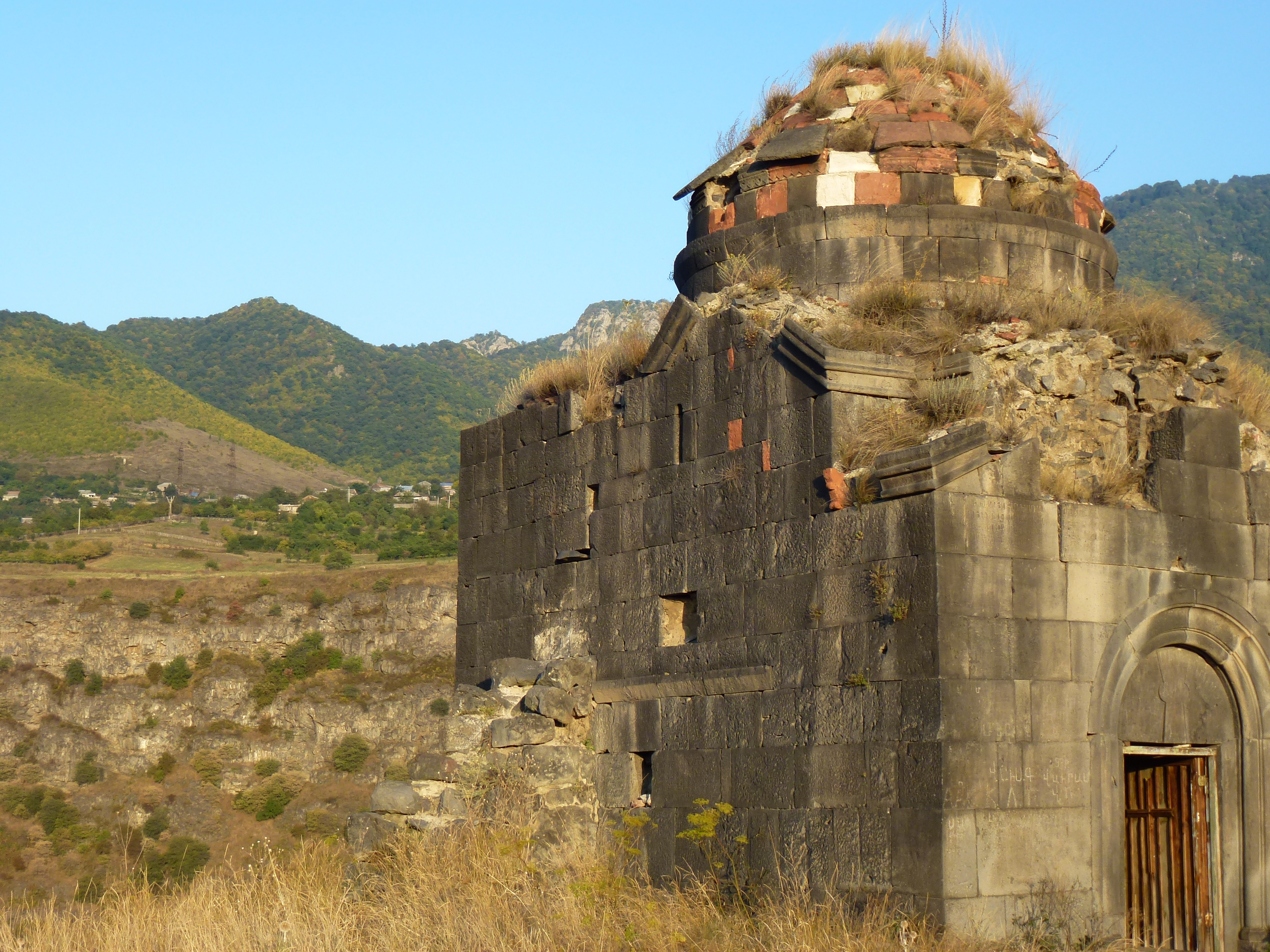
Dsevank

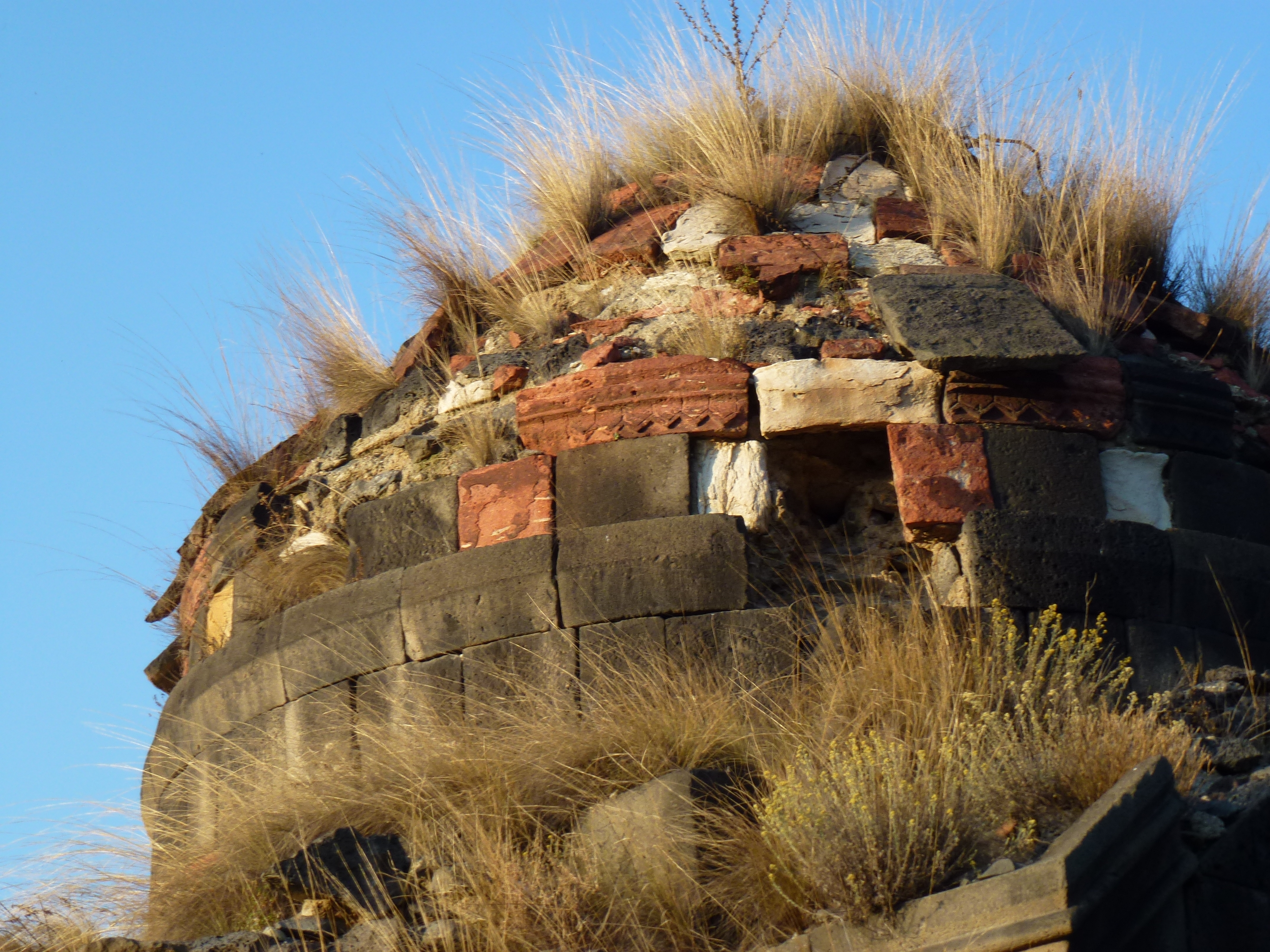
Dome of Dsevank

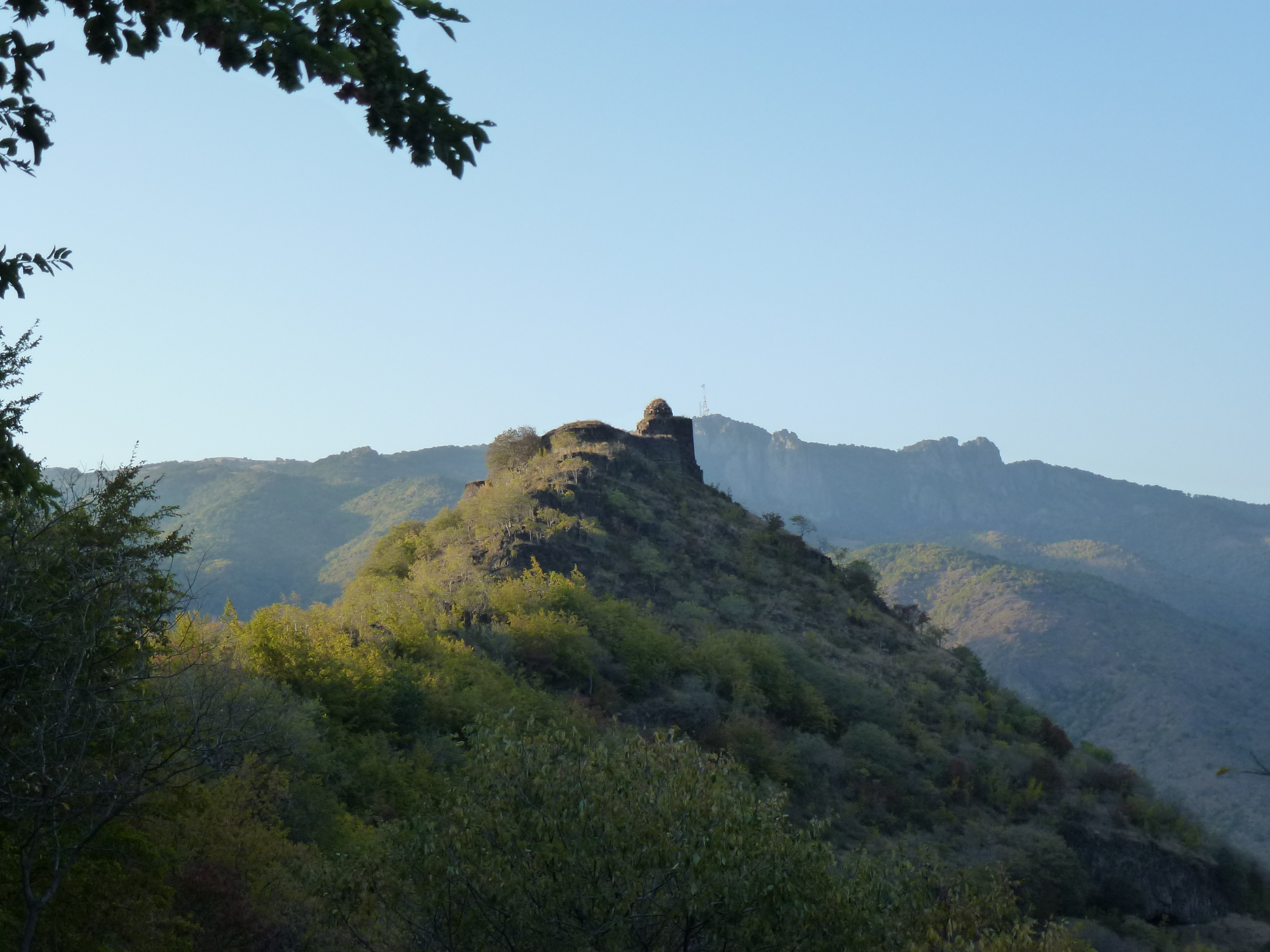
The fortress from the village of Akner
