= Angeghtun =

District of the ancient Kingdom of Armenia

Coordinates: 38°15′26″N 40°05′05″E

Angeghtun (Old Armenian: Անգեղտուն, romanized: Angełtun) or Ingilene (Ancient Greek: Ἰγγηληνή; Latin: Ingilena) was a district of the ancient Kingdom of Armenia centered on the city and fortress of Anggh (Անգղ, Angł), which gave its name to the district. Anggh is often identified with the modern city of Eğil in Turkey, and may have also been the site of Carcathiocerta, capital of the Kingdom of Sophene, and the settlement Ingalawa mentioned in Hittite records. Angeghtun bordered Andzit (Anzitene), possibly at the Taurus Mountains, to its west and Great Tsopk (Sophanene) to its east, possibly at the Western Tigris.

While the district of Angeghtun was likely ruled by a branch of the Orontid dynasty that ruled the Kingdom of Sophene, Armenian sources describe the fortress of Anggh as a royal fortress of the kings of Armenia where the royal treasures were kept. The Grand Chamberlain of Armenia (hayr tʻagawori or mardpet) was in charge of administering the fortress and the wealth within it. According to Cyril Toumanoff, Anggh was likely the central fortress of one of the four bdeashkhs of the Kingdom of Armenia, who were high-ranking nobles in charge of defending the kingdom's border regions.

== See also ==
- List of regions of ancient Armenia

== Bibliography ==
- Marciak, Michał (2017). Sophene, Gordyene, and Adiabene: Three Regna Minora of Northern Mesopotamia Between East and West. BRILL. ISBN 9789004350724.
- Toumanoff, Cyril (1963). Studies in Christian Caucasian History. Georgetown University Press.
