= Balabitene =

Region in historic Armenia

Balabitene, Balahovit, Belahuit, or Belabitene was a region in historic Armenia. It was named for the family that ruled it, on the former territory of the Lope or Puli people.

== See also ==
- List of regions of ancient Armenia
