= Ərus =

- Municipality
- Location within Azerbaijan
- Coordinates: 38°57′06″N 48°19′36″E
- Country: Azerbaijan
- Rayon: Yardymli

Population
  - Total: 1,548
- Time zone: UTC+4 (AZT)
  - Summer (DST): UTC+5 (AZT)

Ərus is a village and municipality in the Yardymli Rayon of Azerbaijan. It has a population of 1,548.
