= Tayk =

Historical province of the Kingdom of Armenia

Coordinates: 40°38′N 41°53′E

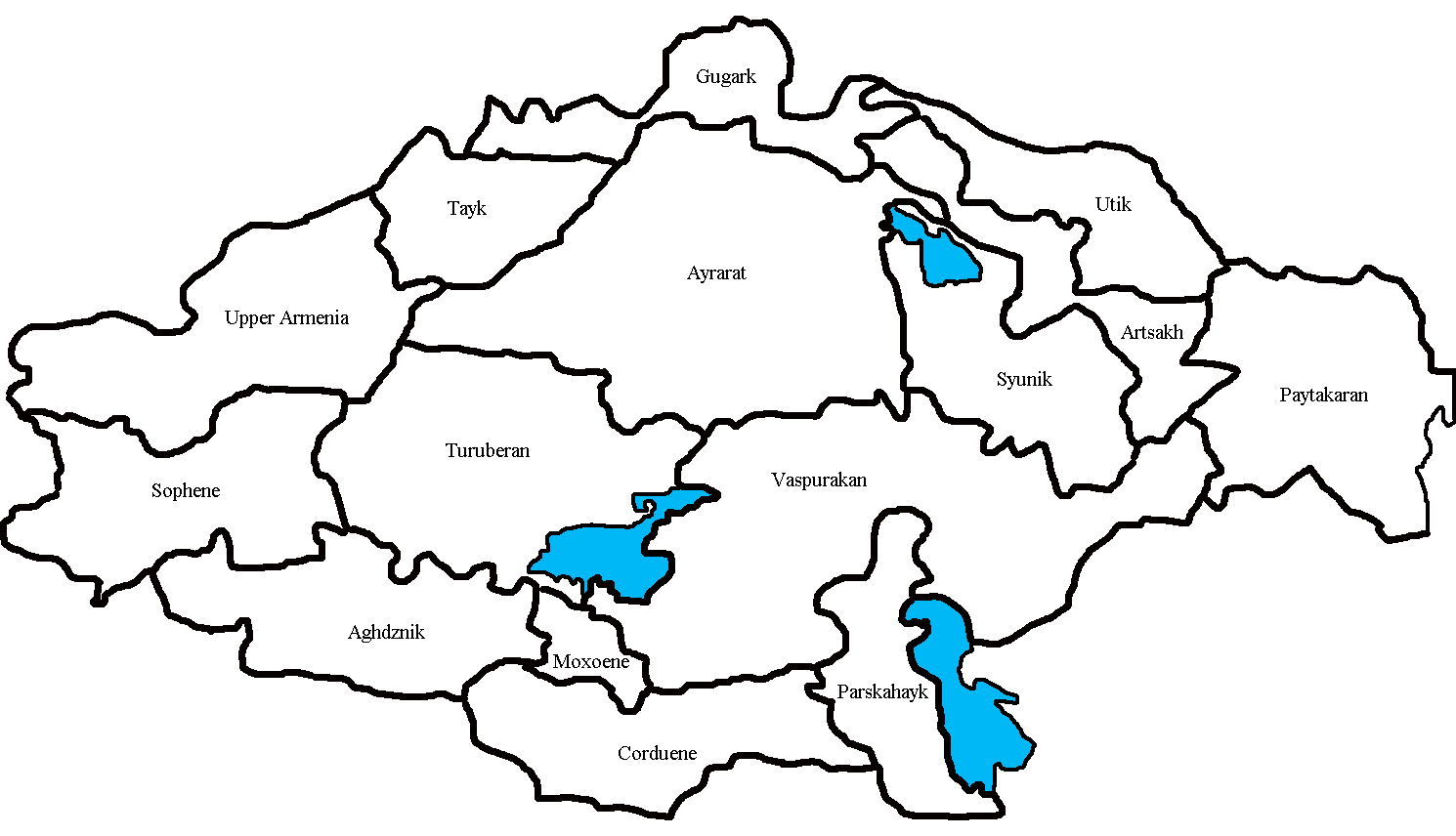
Historical regions of Greater Armenia

Arshakuni Armenia in 150

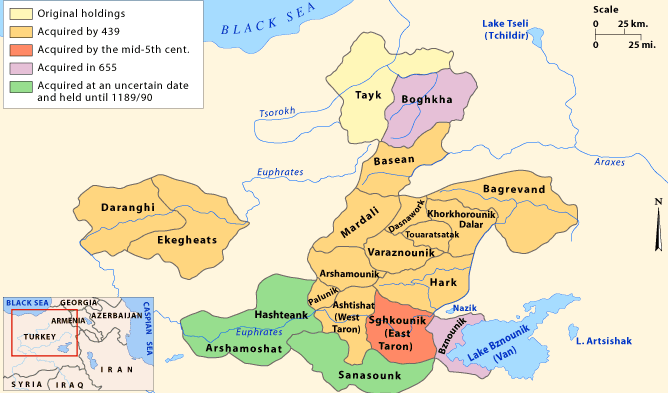
Map showing Tayk of the house of Mamkionians.

Tayk (Armenian: Տայք, Armenian pronunciation: [tajkʰ] Taykʿ) was a historical province of the Kingdom of Armenia, one of its 15 ashkarhs (worlds). Tayk consisted of 8 cantons:

- Kogh
- Berdats por
- Partizats por
- Tchakatk
- Bokha
- Vokaghe
- Azordats por
- Arsiats por

There was a proto-Armenian confederation, Hayasa-Azzi, in this area in the 2nd millennium BC. It was probably the same as (and with a name likely related etymologically to) the Daiaeni and Diauehi of Assyrian and Urartian sources. From the 2nd century BC to the 9th century AD Tayk was a part of Armenian kingdoms or "autonomies": Greater Armenia, Marzpan Armenia and Bagratid Armenia.

In the 999 A.D., Tayk or Tao became part of the Georgian Bagratid principality of Tayk-Kharjk or Tao-Klarjeti. The Tayk province covered the contemporary Turkish districts of Yusufeli (Kiskim) in Artvin Province and Oltu, Olur (Tavusker), Tortum and Çamlıkaya (Hunut) to the north of İspir in Erzurum Province. To its southwest is found the ancient region of Sper. After World War I, Armenia and Georgia contested the region, with particular conflict over Oltik. As a result, in 1920, after the Russo-Turkish attacks Armenia lost the region of Oltik, which become a part of Turkey.

== History ==
=== Antiquity ===
Tayk is mentioned in the earliest sources under the names Daiaeni and Diauehi in Assyrian and Urartian cuneiform inscriptions. After the 760s BC, the name Diauehi no longer appears in cuneiform sources, but it was apparently preserved among ancient authors as the land of the Taochi, in the Georgian tradition as Tao, and in the Armenian environment as Tayk. According to A. Novoseltsev, in antiquity the region was inhabited by a distinct people who were later assimilated by Armenians and Georgians.

In 401 BC, while passing through Armenia, the Greek commander Xenophon mentioned the land of the Taochi. In the 4th century BC, in his Anabasis, he described the local tribes, the Taochi, Chalybes and Phasians, as free peoples who did not submit to the Persian king. According to R. Edwards, the Taochi, probably connected with the pre-classical Daiaeni, mainly lived in the valleys of Olti, Narman and Tortum. During this period, like the Carduchi and the Chaldi, they preserved their independence from Persian rule, although later they came under the sphere of influence of the Iberians.

According to C. Toumanoff, already in the 4th-3rd centuries BC the region was part of the ancient Georgian kingdom of Iberia. According to Strabo, at the beginning of the 2nd century BC, Artaxiad Greater Armenia took from Iberia the region of Pariadres, which researchers usually identify with Tayk. Thus, during the reign of Artaxias I, Tayk was restored to the Armenian state. Until the 3rd century, Tayk remained a royal estate and an important military district.

=== The Mamikonians and the early Middle Ages ===
In the 230s, the Armenian king Khosrov I the Great transferred most of Tayk to the Mamikonians as a hereditary estate. In the early Middle Ages, Tayk became one of the main domains of this nakharar house. According to Faustus of Byzantium, the Mamikonians ruled Tayk already from the 4th century. In scholarly literature, there are different hypotheses about their origin: R. Edwards associated them with the Kartvelian Chan tribe, while C. Toumanoff suggested a Chan or Laz origin for the Mamikonians. Their integration into the Armenian political system took place gradually, through military alliances, marriages and the acquisition of hereditary offices from the Armenian monarchy.

After the first partition of Armenia in 387, Tayk came under the Persian sphere of influence, but its western border simultaneously became a political, strategic and ideological dividing line between the Byzantine Empire and Sasanian Persia. Tayk remained within the borders of the Armenian kingdom, which had become a vassal of the Sasanians, and later within the Armenian Marzpanate.

After the abolition of Armenian royal authority in 428, the Mamikonians, whose main rivals were the Bagratunis, continued to defend their interests independently in relations with Byzantium and Persia. In 450-451, Tayk took part in the Armenian uprising against Sasanian Persia, known as the Vardanants War or the Avarayr uprising. During this period, Hmayak Mamikonian, relying on the support of local mountaineers, nobles, townspeople and peasants, organized resistance against the Persian troops. Fortified in the forested mountains of Tayk, the Mamikonians and their allies successfully fought against the Persian detachments, but later suffered defeat at the hands of Vasak Siwni, who led a punitive expedition in the region.

The acts of the ecclesiastical council of Dvin of 555 are among the last known documents mentioning an Armenian bishop from Tayk. According to N. Aleksidze, in the late 6th and early 7th centuries Tao gradually adopted the Chalcedonian tradition and ceased to be subordinate to the Church of Persarmenia, which may indicate a possible strengthening of Georgian ecclesiastical jurisdiction in the region.

As a result of the Byzantine-Sasanian War of 572-591, in 591 Tayk came under the control of Emperor Maurice. According to C. Toumanoff, it became part of the Byzantine province of “Deep Armenia”, which consisted of Tayk proper, Bolkha and Kogh. R. Edwards, however, noted that there is no direct evidence that Tayk was renamed “Deep Armenia”. In 607, the Synod of Dvin condemned the Council of Chalcedon, after which some Armenian Chalcedonians moved to Tayk, which was within the Iberian political sphere, while others moved to Byzantium. It was in Tayk that a particularly large Armenian-Chalcedonian population lived, since the Armenian and Georgian environments came into contact there. According to the testimony of Stepanos Syunetsi, at the turn of the 7th-8th centuries there also existed a Tayk dialect of the Armenian language.

=== Arab rule and the decline of the Mamikonians ===
From the middle of the 7th century, Tayk came under the conditions of the Arab conquests. During this period, when Byzantine troops had abandoned a number of Armenian districts, Tayk was part of Armenia, which had temporarily restored its autonomy under the leadership of Theodoros Rshtuni. In the late 7th and early 8th centuries, many Armenian princely houses took refuge in the mountainous regions of Tayk, escaping the persecution of the Arab conquerors. Tayk became one of the centers of anti-Arab resistance under the leadership of the Mamikonians.

The Arab campaigns of the 7th-8th centuries had severe consequences for the Mamikonians. Especially destructive were the campaign of the Arab commander Marwan the Deaf in 735 and the anti-Arab uprising of 774-775. The defeat of this uprising was catastrophic for the Mamikonians: they lost almost all their estates, including Tayk, as well as a significant part of their political influence. After this, their estates in Tayk passed mainly to the Bagratunis, and partly to Iberian forces. At that time, the Armenian Gnuni family also moved to Tayk.

According to V. Stepanenko, until the 8th century Tayk was part of Armenia and was a domain of the Mamikonians, while the overwhelming majority of its population were Armenians. At the same time, the political upheavals following the Arab conquests encouraged the influx of additional Georgian settlers, probably Laz or Chan people, into the valleys of the Chorokhi and Tortum.

According to C. Toumanoff’s hypothesis, after 772 Tayk, or Tao, which had previously belonged to the Mamikonians, was divided into two parts: Upper Tao passed to the Bagratids, while Lower Tao, together with Asispori, passed to the Guaramids. Approximately between 786 and 807, Lower Tao, together with Arseats Por in Upper Tao, passed to the Iberian Bagratids. In 813, all of Tao was finally united under the rule of the Georgian branch of the Bagratids, and from that time Tayk gradually passed from the Armenian political sphere into the Georgian one.

=== Georgian colonization and the transformation of Tayk into Tao ===
The Life of Gregory of Khandzta testifies to the desolation of Tayk at the time when it was settled by Georgians. According to one interpretation, Georgian monks in Tayk lived among an Armenian population, and the first Georgian monasteries were founded on the sites of ruined Armenian monasteries. Wachtang Djobadze, however, objected to this interpretation and noted that the text primarily speaks about the destruction and depopulation of the region after the Arab invasions, because of which Gregory of Khandzta had difficulty finding workers to build a church.

According to V. Stepanenko, the Georgian colonization of Tayk led to the beginning of the process of assimilation of the local Armenian population. As a result, Tayk gradually turned into Tao. By the end of the 10th century, in his opinion, the Georgian population already formed the majority, although a significant Armenian population also remained in the region.

R. Edwards and R. Hewsen criticized the extreme approaches of both Armenian and Georgian historians who presented Tayk as either an exclusively Armenian or an exclusively Georgian region. In their opinion, the northern districts of Tayk probably had a more pronounced Georgian character, while the southern districts, especially Bolkha, Berdats Por and Partizats Por, may have been predominantly Armenian. Edwards also noted that the ecclesiastical and defensive architecture of northern Tayk was mainly Georgian, while that of southern Tayk was Armenian, and he considered the Arsiani Range to be the dividing line between these two zones.

=== Tayk in the 10th-11th centuries ===
In the 10th century, in part of Tayk and neighboring Klarjeti, the Georgian Bagratids founded a principality that was in vassal dependence on the Byzantine Empire and was known as the Curopalate of Tao-Klarjeti. This principality was forced for a long time to conduct a complex diplomatic and military struggle against Byzantium, seeking to preserve its internal autonomy. The Bagratid branch of Tayk recognized Byzantine suzerainty and the Chalcedonian confession, while its rulers bore high titles granted by the emperors.

Tayk reached the height of its power in the 10th century under David Kuropalates. The district became an important center of Armenian-Georgian Chalcedonian culture and architecture. Notable monuments of Christian architecture belong to this period, including Oshki, Khakhuli and Ishkhan. Monastic centers actively developed here, where manuscripts were copied and a distinctive borderland cultural environment was formed.

According to S. Rapp, the region was among the possessions of the Georgian Bagratids, who had moved from their Armenian homeland to the western Armenian-Georgian frontier and over time assimilated into Georgian culture. The Georgian Church also found a considerable number of followers here, since many Armenian Chalcedonians lived in Tayk.

According to R. P. Blake and S. Der Nersessian, in the 10th century a process of “de-Armenianization” took place in Tayk, connected with the Arab devastations, Georgian migration and the strengthening influence of the Georgian Church. Armenian influence gradually gave way to Georgian influence, while part of the Armenians underwent Hellenization or Georgianization.

In 1001, after the death of David Kuropalates, his domains passed to the Byzantine Empire according to a prior testament. Emperor Basil II created the Byzantine theme of Iberia in the territory of Tayk, with the fortress city of Olti as its center. This led to long wars between Byzantium and the Kingdom of Georgia, since the latter sought to recover the inheritance of David Kuropalates.

In the 11th century, this part of Tayk was annexed to the central kingdom of the Georgian Bagratids, which experienced a period of rise and active development in the 11th-13th centuries. After Byzantium’s defeat by the Seljuks at the Battle of Manzikert in 1071, Tayk, along with a number of other Armenian lands, passed under Seljuk rule.

=== Late Middle Ages and Ottoman rule ===
In the late 12th and early 13th centuries, the united Armenian-Georgian forces liberated Tayk. However, after the Tatar-Mongol conquests and the fall of the Georgian Bagratid kingdom, the district remained within Samtskhe-Saatabago, or the domains of the atabegs of Samtskhe.

By the Ottoman-Persian treaty of 1590, Tayk passed to the Ottoman Empire. In the 17th-18th centuries, the Armenian-Chalcedonian population of Tayk was subjected to forced Islamization, while the Armenian Apostolics, according to the testimony of the 17th-century author Hakob Karnetsi, were able to preserve the Christian faith. In the 18th-19th centuries, Armenians who had converted to Islam were also forced to adopt Turkish.

=== Modern and contemporary period ===
After the Russo-Turkish War (1877-1878), part of Tayk passed to the Russian Empire. Most of the Turkified population moved to the Ottoman Empire, while Armenians from Western Armenia also settled in Tayk.

In 1918-1920, part of Tayk became part of the First Republic of Armenia. However, after these territories were occupied by Turkey, the local Armenians were subjected to massacres and violence, and the survivors moved to the South Caucasus.

== Administrative division ==
Administratively, Tayk was divided into 8 districts:

- Kogh - center: Kriakunk
- Berdats Por - center: Banak
- Partizats Por - center: Partez
- Chakk - center: Ishkhank
- Boghkha - center: Ukhtik
- Vokaghe - center: Tortum
- Azordats Por - center: Azord
- Arsyats Por - center: Arsis

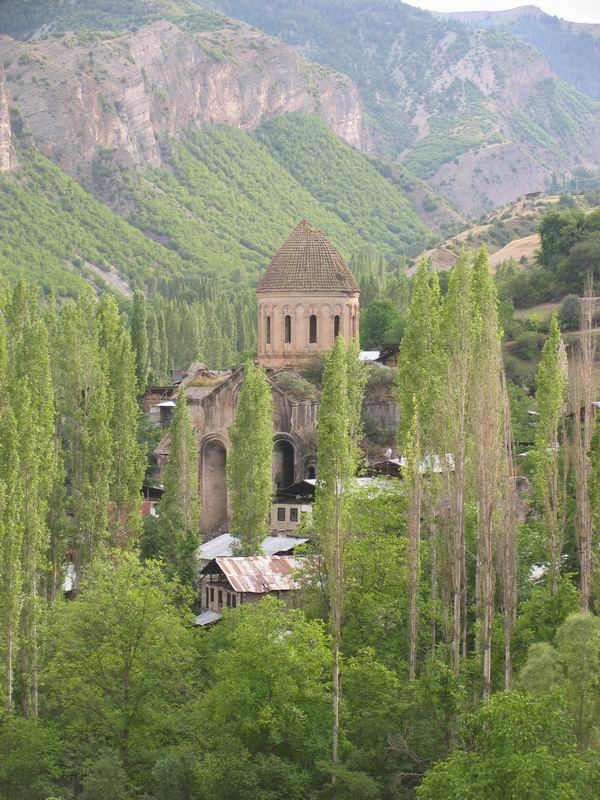
Monastic complex in the province of Tayk

== Geography and administrative division ==
Tayk was a highly mountainous and forested country. It bordered Pontus to the west, Lazica and Egerk or Adjara to the north, Klarjeti of Gugark and Vanand of Ayrarat to the northeast and east, and Upper Armenia and Basean of Ayrarat to the south. On all the mentioned sides, Tayk was separated from neighboring lands by mountain ranges. Thanks to its mountainous and forested position, it was known for its strength and often became a refuge for Armenian kings and princes in unfavorable political conditions.

The 7th-century Armenian historical-geographical monument, the Ashkharhatsuyts, lists Tayk among the provinces of Greater Armenia and presents it as follows:

“Tayk, adjacent to Gugark, has nine districts: 1. Kogh, 2. Berdats Por, 3. Partizats Por, 4. Chakk, 5. Bukha, 6. Vokaghe, 7. Azord, 8. Hayats Por, 9. Aseats Por. Tayk produces figs, pomegranates, sumac, quinces, terebinth and almonds.”

According to the Ashkharhatsuyts, Tayk was rich in figs, pomegranates, quinces, terebinth and almonds. Based on these data, academician S. T. Yeremian assumed that the total area of Tayk was about 10,179 km². However, some modern researchers, including Robert Edwards, believe that the Ashkharhatsuyts exaggerated the actual size of Tayk. According to him, the scarcity of Armenian toponyms and structures in the northern and western parts suggests that in the Middle Ages the Chorokhi River was not the northern boundary of Tayk, and that the boundary passed farther south, along the Ak-Daglar mountain range.

This extensive region was divided into three main parts: Tayk proper, Bukha and Kogh. These territories were probably united under the common name “Tayk” after the Byzantine-Persian treaty of 591.

According to Robert H. Hewsen, Tayk proper consisted of the districts of Aseats Por, Azord, Vokaghe and Chakk. R. Edwards also noted that there was no clear boundary between Tayk and southern Klarjeti. The districts of Nigal, Mrul and Mrit together formed most of Egeria, which served as the western boundary of Klarjeti; however, until the beginning of the 9th century, the southeastern part of Egeria was part of Tayk, forming the so-called Lower Tayk.

Early information about Tayk was also reported by Xenophon. According to his testimony, the inhabitants of Tayk, the Tay people, were brave and warlike, did not submit to Achaemenid Persia and preserved their independence. Various peoples lived in the region, among whom Armenians had predominated since ancient times.

According to the Ashkharhatsuyts, the province of Tayk consisted of 8-9 districts, which were mentioned from east to west in the following order:

1. Kogh
2. Berdats Por
3. Partizats Por
4. Chakatk or Chakk
5. Bukha
6. Vokaghe
7. Azordats Por
8. Aysryats Por or Aseats Por

== Districts ==
=== Kogh ===
Kogh, Georgian Kola, extended in the area of the sources of the Kura River and in its territory almost corresponded to the modern Göle district. A fortress of the same name is mentioned in the district, but its geographical location remains uncertain. Kogh bordered the district of Ardahan in Gugark to the north, Vanand in Ayrarat to the east, Berdats Por in Tayk to the south and Chakk to the west. It is assumed to be identical with Kulkh, mentioned in Urartian inscriptions.

The settlement of Kriakunk was located in the territory of Kogh. According to Movses Khorenatsi, King Vagharshak of Armenia founded gardens and flower gardens in Kogh, turning it into a royal summer residence and hunting ground. During the reign of his son Arshak I, the Bulgar tribes that invaded from the Caucasus settled in the fertile and grain-rich southern plain of Kogh.

According to the historian Ghevond, 12,000 Armenians fleeing Arab persecution, led by Prince Shapuh of the Amatuni family and his son Hamam, defeated their pursuing enemy in Kogh in 789 and passed into Chaldia. In the second half of the 9th century, Kogh passed to the Kingdom of Abkhazia, but the Armenian king Smbat I Bagratuni reunited it with Armenia. In the second half of the 10th century, Kogh became part of the Curopalate of Tayk, from the beginning of the 11th century part of the Byzantine Empire, and from the end of the 12th century part of the Kingdom of Georgia.

In the first half of the 13th century, Kogh was conquered by the Tatar-Mongols, and in the 16th century by the Ottoman Turks. In 1877, it passed to Russia and roughly corresponded to the Göle section of the Ardahan okrug of the Kars Oblast. After the Turkish occupation of 1918, part of the Armenians of Kogh were killed, while the survivors took refuge in the Transcaucasus. In April 1919, Kogh, as part of the Kars region, passed to the Republic of Armenia, but Kemalist Turkey again occupied the region in October 1920 during the Turkish-Armenian War. By the treaties of Moscow and Kars of 1921, it was ceded to Turkey.

=== Berdats Por and Partizats Por ===
Immediately west of Kogh extended the district of Berdats Por, and farther west, on one of the tributaries of the modern Olti River, was Partizats Por.

The district of Partizats Por occupied the upper and middle course of the Partez tributary of Ukhtik. The center of the district was the settlement of Partez. To the east it was separated by the Karmir Porak, now Soganlu, Mountains from the Vanand district of the province of Ayrarat, and to the south by the Metsrats Mountains from the districts of Basean and Abegheank. It bordered Berdats Por to the north and Bokha to the west. According to S. T. Yeremian, the district covered an area of 662 km².

=== Vokaghe or Ukhtik ===
Vokaghe, or Ukhtik, occupied the middle course of the Olti River. The fortress city of Ukhtik, corresponding to modern Olti, was located here. The villages of Geghikr and Vardashen, mentioned by Ghazar Parpetsi, were also located in this district, near the border with Basean.

According to S. Yeremian, Vokaghe included the upper and middle course of the Azord, now Tortum, River and corresponds to the modern Tortum district.

=== Azordats Por ===
Azordats Por, or Azord, was one of the districts of the province of Tayk in Greater Armenia. From the 4th to the 8th centuries, it was the property of the Mamikonians. The center of the district was Azord.

In the 10th century, when Azordats Por was part of the Curopalate of Tayk, part of the Armenian population adhered to Chalcedonianism. During that period, Chalcedonian churches were built in the villages of Oshk, Khakhu, Egrek or Agarak, Is and others. In 1000, Azordats Por, together with most of Tayk, was annexed to Byzantium. In the 13th century, the territory of Azordats Por became known as Tortum.

== Culture and architecture ==
The cultural heritage of Tayk represents a distinctive synthesis of Armenian and Georgian spiritual traditions. According to V. Stepanenko, traces of the province's Armenian past have been preserved both in toponymy and in the remains of architectural monuments. Among them are the Bana Cathedral, the Ishkhan church, the Surb Khach or Subhechi church, Oshkvank or Oshki, the Khakhu church, the fortress of Olti, and other monuments.

It is noteworthy that some of the oldest Georgian manuscripts were copied in monasteries bearing Armenian names, such as Shatberdi, Midznadzor and Ishkhan. It has been suggested that some of these monasteries may have been founded earlier by Armenians.

In the 1970s and 1980s, the architectural researcher Tiran Marutyan advanced the view that the famous churches of Tayk from the 10th and 11th centuries were built by Armenian masters. The almost complete absence of Armenian inscriptions on these monuments was explained by the fact that, by that period, part of the Armenian population of Tayk had already adopted Chalcedonianism or Orthodoxy and used Georgian in church rites and writing as the official language of the Chalcedonian ecclesiastical environment.

Robert Blake and Sirarpie Der Nersessian suggested that the name Oshki may be a modified form of the Armenian toponym Ashunk. The historian Vardan Areveltsi mentioned Sahak Mrut, bishop of Tayk, who lived in Ashunk and was known for his theological disputes with Patriarch Photios of Constantinople. If the identification of Ashunk with Oshki is correct, then Oshki was already the seat of the Armenian bishop of Tayk and an important center of manuscript copying in the mid-9th century.

== Sources ==
- Arutyunova-Fidanyan, Viada A., Some Aspects of the Military-Administrative Districts and Byzantine Administration in Armenia During the 11th Century, REArm 20, 1986-87: 309–20.
- Garsoian, Nina. The Byzantine Annexation of the Armenian Kingdoms in the Eleventh Century, 192 p. In: The Armenian People from Ancient to Modern Times, vol. 1, edited by Richard G. Hovannisian, St. Martin's Press, New York, 1977.
- Hewsen, Robert. Armenia. A Historical Atlas. The University of Chicago Press, Chicago, 2001, Pp 341.
- Tayk - Tayots Ashhar (Тайк - Тайоц ашхар)

== See also ==
- List of regions of ancient Armenia
- Bana cathedral
- Tao
