= Tortum Gölü =

Lake in Turkey

Coordinates: 40°37′20″N 41°38′04″E

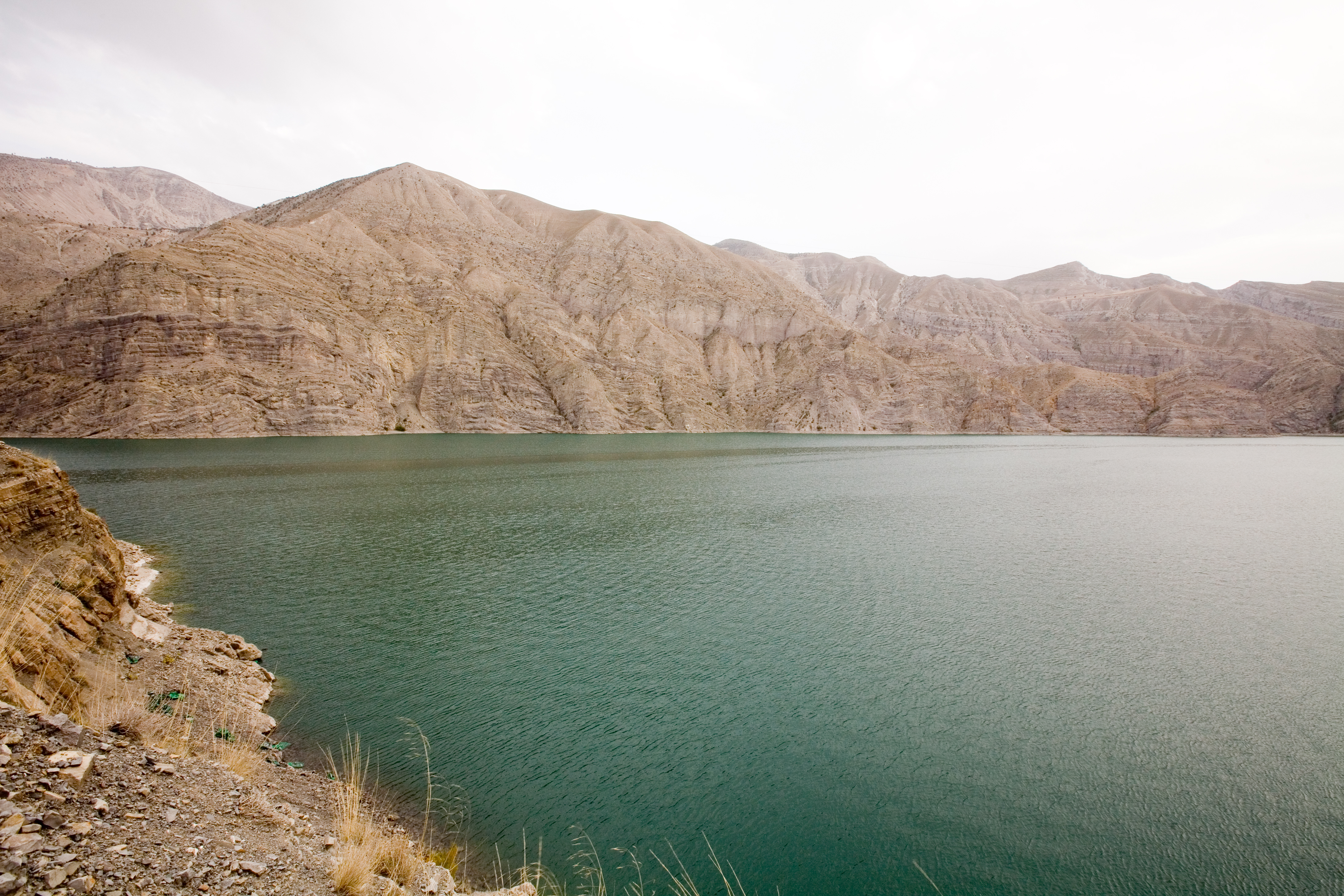
Tortum Lake

The Tortum Gölü or Tortum Lake is a lake in the northeastern Turkish province of Erzurum, the water level of which was increased by 1.5 m by a concrete dam built in 1971-1972.

The Tortum Gölü is located 10 km northeast of Uzundere and is traversed by the river Tortum Çayı. The dammed lake covers an area of 6.62 km². The storage space is 57.561 million m³. The hydroelectric power plant has an installed capacity of 26.2 MW. The standard energy capacity is 85 GWh per year. The Tortum Waterfall below the dam wall is only supplied with water during months with high rainfall.
