= Azordats por =

Azordats-por(Ազորդաց փոր) was the southernmost canton of the province of Tayk in the kingdom of Armenia. it corresponds with the modern province of Tortum in the republic of Turkey. It was under the control of the Mamikonian noble family in the kingdom of Armenia, later passing to the rule of the Bagratuni princes of Tayk. The Bagratids line of Tayk converted to Chalcedonian Christianity and many of the Armenian villages and towns of the region became Chalcedonians. Later under Georgian rule, the Armenian Chalcedonian bishops joined the Georgian Catholicos and became part of the Georgian Orthodox Church while still retaining the use of Armenian in their liturgy while fully adopting the Byzantine rite.

The region was under the rule of the Georgian Samtskhe atabegate until the Ottoman Empire conquered the region in 1550. In the mid 17th century, a certain mullah Jaffar put heavy taxes on the region which enticed most of the Chalcedonian Armenians to convert to Sunni Islam. The Muslim Armenians, having switched millets through religious conversion, eventually adopted a Hemshin identity and began identifying as Hemshins even though they were not Hamshens. "Hemshins" still make up a predominant portion of the population in the Tortum region today.
