= Tortum Dam =

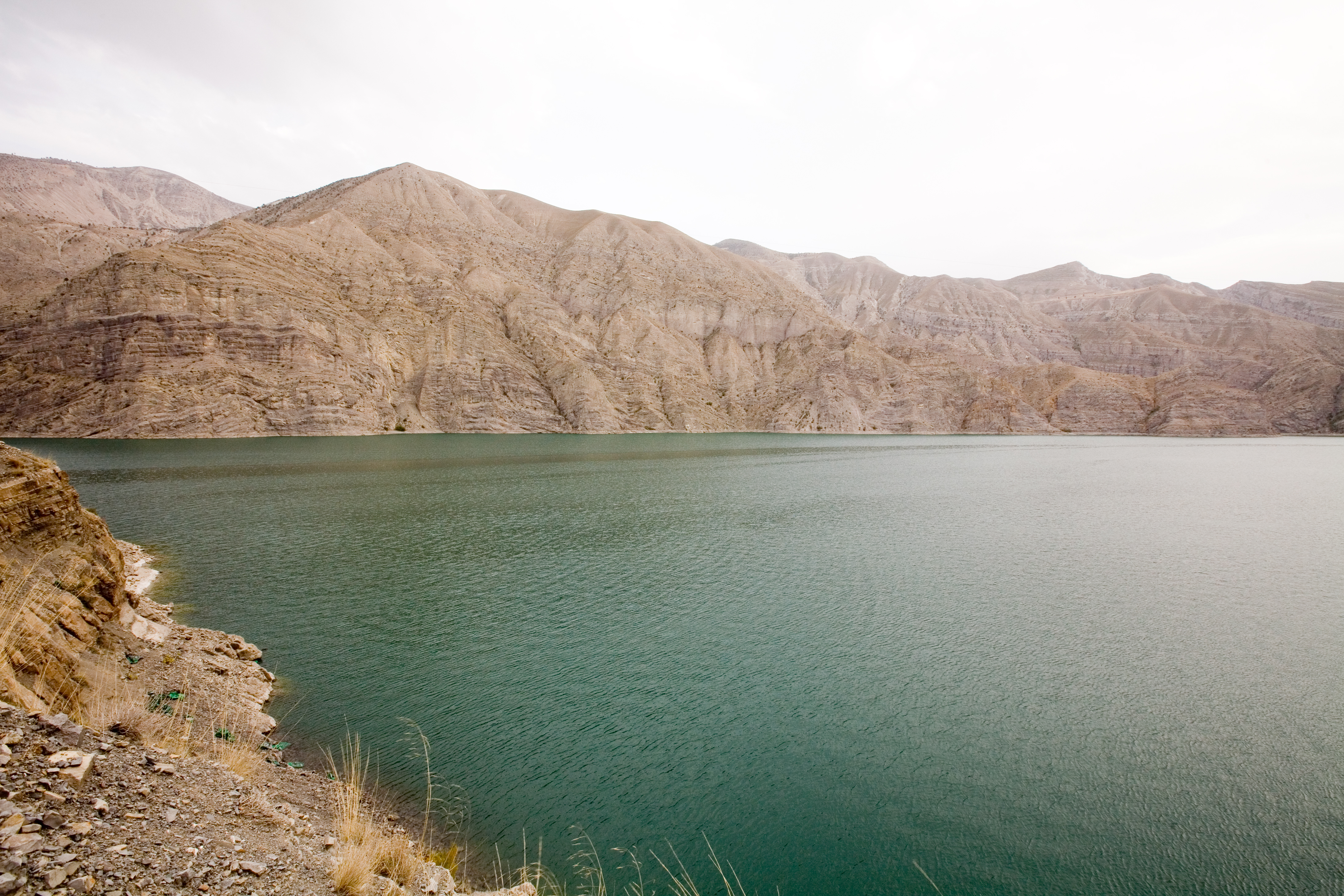
- The Tortum Dam Lake
- Location: Turkey
- Coordinates: 40.6567°N 41.6588°E
- Construction began: 1971
- Opening date: 1972

Dam and spillways
- Height: 1.5 m (5 ft)

Reservoir
- Total capacity: 57,600,000 m^{3} (46,697 acre⋅ft)
- Surface area: 6.6 km^{2} (3 sq mi)

Power Station
- Installed capacity: 26 MW
- Annual generation: 100 GWh

Tortum Dam is a dam on the Tortum River in Erzurum Province, Turkey. The dam, backed by the Turkish State Hydraulic Works, was built on a natural landslide near Tortum Waterfall and raises the level of the existing lake for hydroelectric power production.

== See also ==
- List of dams and reservoirs in Turkey
