= Erzurum Province =

Province of Turkey

Coordinates: 40°03′47″N 41°34′01″E

Erzurum Province Erzurum ili
- Province and metropolitan municipality
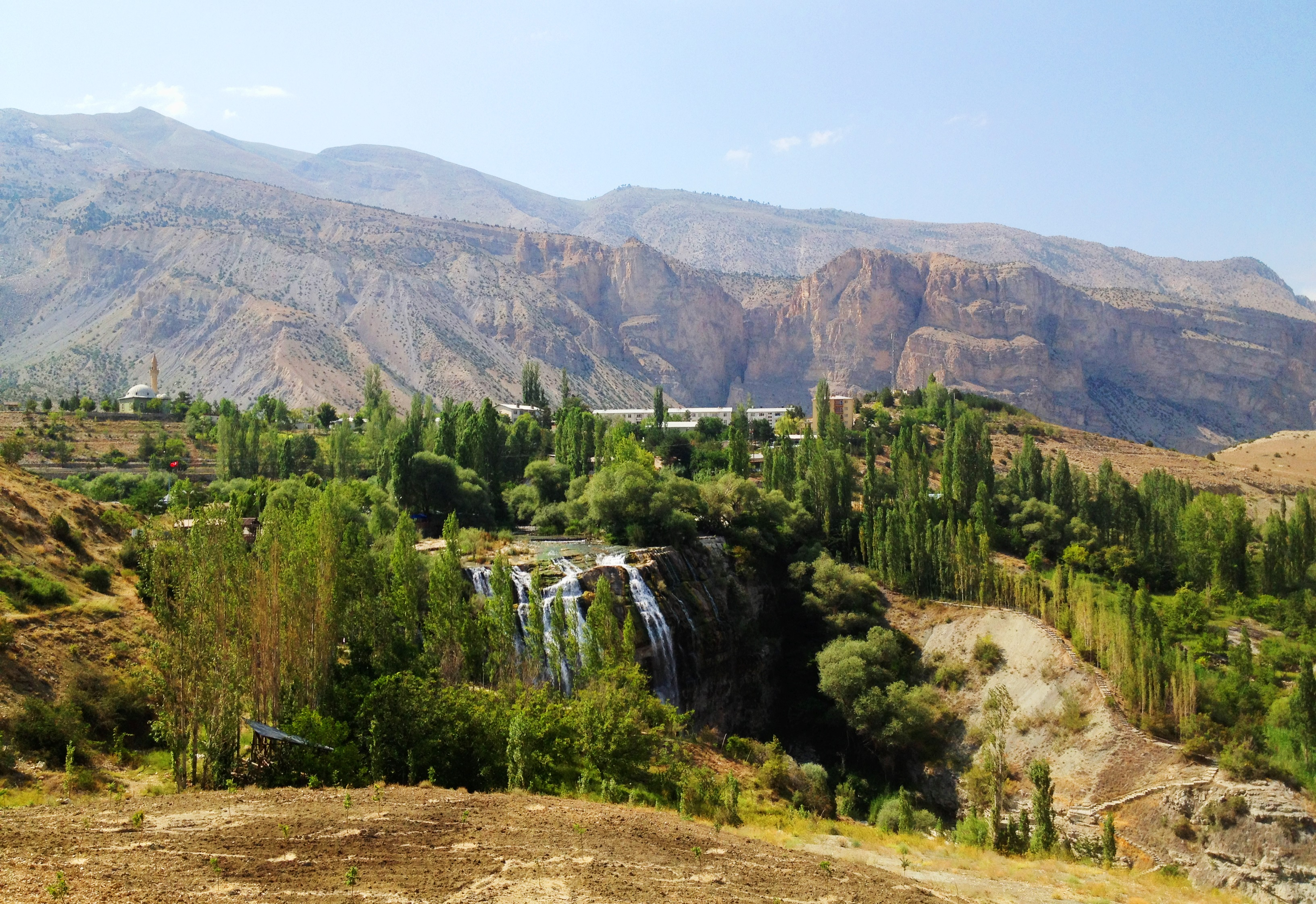
- Tortum Waterfalls in Erzurum Province

- Location of the province within Turkey
- Country: Turkey
- Seat: Erzurum

Government
  - Mayor: Mehmet Sekmen (AK Party)
  - Vali: Aydın Baruş
- Area: 25,006 km^{2} (9,655 sq mi)
- Population (2022): 749,754
  - Density: 29.983/km^{2} (77.656/sq mi)
- Time zone: UTC+3 (TRT)
- Area code: 0442
- Website: www.erzurum.gov.tr

Erzurum Province (Turkish: Erzurum ili) is a province and metropolitan municipality in the Eastern Anatolia Region of Turkey. Its area is 25,006 km^{2}, and its population is 749,754 (2022). The capital of the province is the city of Erzurum. It is the fourth largest province in all of Turkey. It is bordered by the provinces of Kars and Ağrı to the east, Muş and Bingöl to the south, Erzincan and Bayburt to the west, Rize and Artvin to the north and Ardahan to the northeast. The current governor of the province is Aydın Baruş, appointed in February 2026. The province has a Turkish majority.

== Geography ==
The surface area of the province of Erzurum is the fourth biggest in Turkey. The majority of the province is elevated. Most plateaus are about 2,000 m (6,600 ft) above sea level, and the mountainous regions beyond the plateaus are 3,000 m (9,800 ft) and higher. Depression plains are located between the mountains and plateaus. The southern mountain ranges include the Palandöken Mountains (highest peak Büyük Ejder 3,176 m or 10,420 ft high) and the Şahveled Mountains (highest peak Çakmak Mountain 3,063 m or 10,049 ft high). The northern mountain ranges are the second row elevations of the North Anatolian Mountains, i.e. Mescit Mountains (highest peak 3,239 m or 10,627 ft high), Kargapazarı Mountains (highest peak 3,169 m or 10,397 ft high) and Allahuekber Mountains. The two depression plains between these mountainous areas are Erzurum Plains and Hasankale Plains. Aras Mountains starts first in Erzurum. Then it extends towards the borders of Ağrı and Kars. Erzurum province is surrounded by Bingöl and Akdoğan Mountains from the south.

Continental climate rules in the province with long and harsh winters, and short and mild summers.

Steppe formations are prevalent geographic features of this province, occupying about 60% of the surface area, much of it fertile. Forested areas are small, mainly consisting of scots pines and oaks.

The eastern part of the province lies in the basin of the Aras river, the western part in the Karasu (Euphrates) basin, and the northern part in the Çoruh basin.

There are few natural lakes in the province, the major one being Tortum Gölü (approximately 8 km^{2}) fed by the Tortum (Uzundere) Falls. The Tortum hydroelectric power plant built in 1963 is situated on the inlet of this lake. There are three artificial lakes in the province.

=== Districts ===
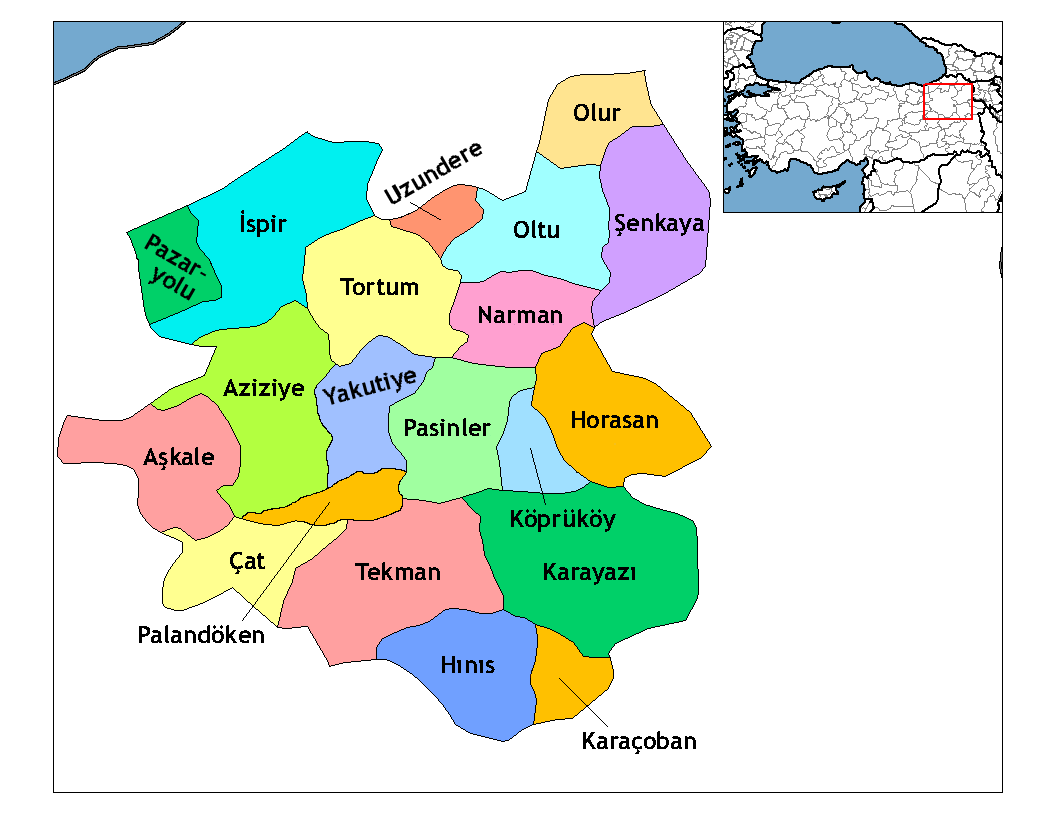
Map showing districts of Erzurum Province.

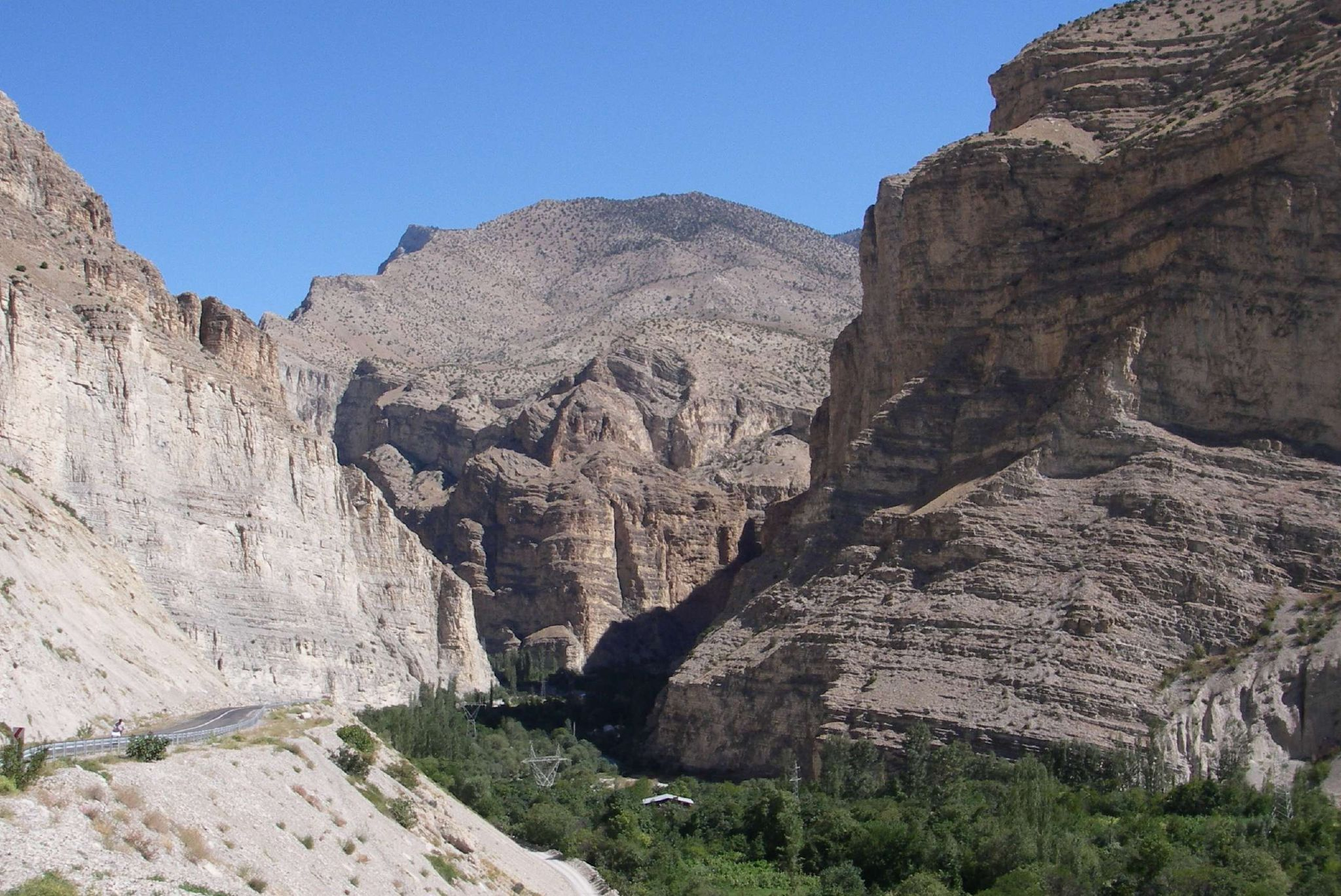
Tortum River valley, Erzurum Province

Greater Erzurum

- Palandöken
- Yakutiye

Area: 1,612 sq km, Population: 370,000 (2022)

Rest of Erzurum Province

- Aşkale
- Aziziye
- Çat
- Hınıs
- Horasan
- İspir
- Karaçoban
- Karayazı
- Köprüköy
- Narman
- Oltu
- Olur
- Pasinler
- Pazaryolu
- Şenkaya
- Tekman
- Tortum
- Uzundere

== History ==
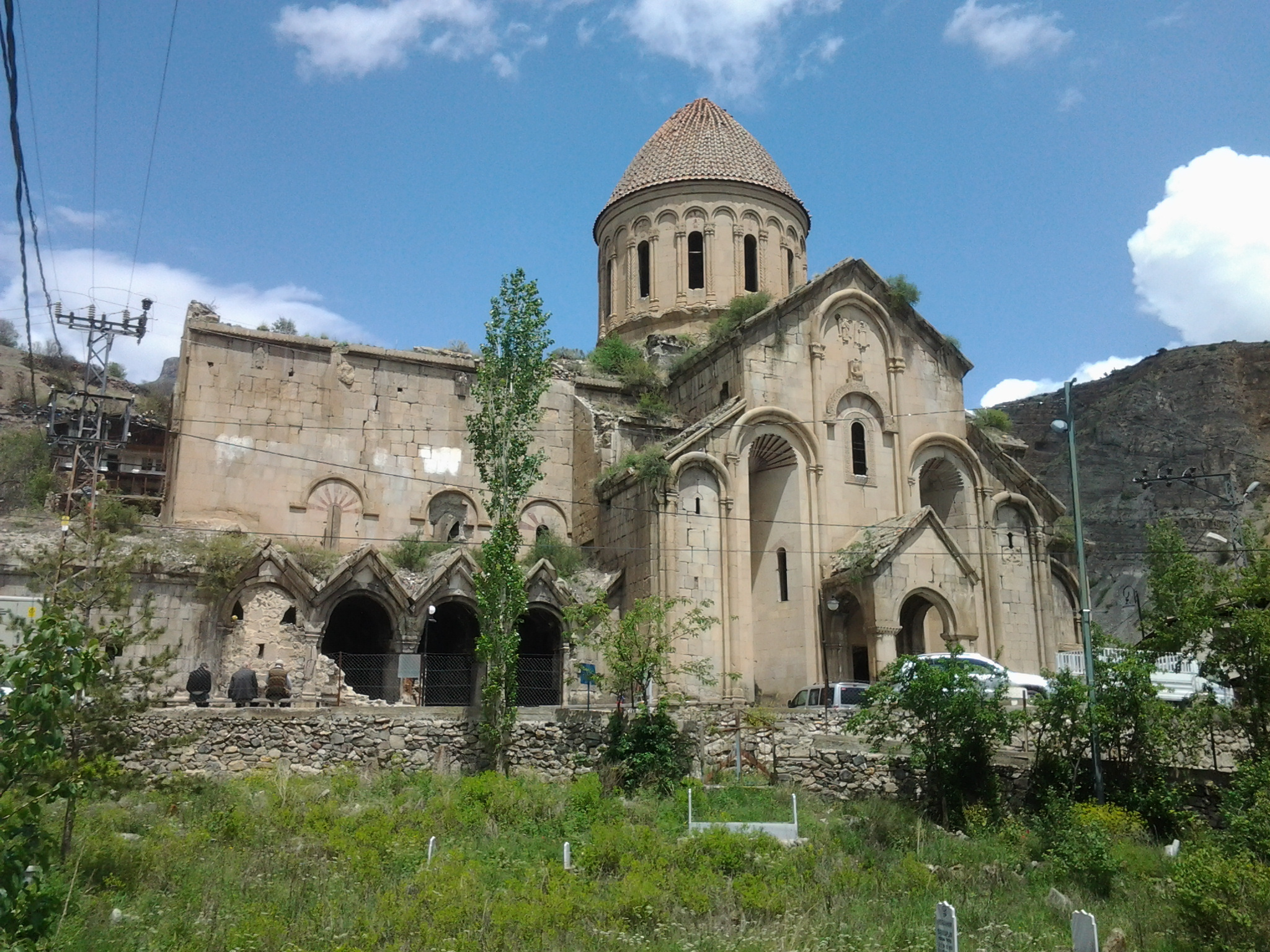
Georgian monastery of Öşvank (Oshk Vank), the church

Known as Karanitis (Ancient Greek: Καρανῖτις/Καρηνῖτις), Arzen, Erzen, and (Armenian:Էրզրում նահանգ, Կարին ) Karin or Garin, most of the province was incorporated into the Roman Empire in the 4th century (after the first split of Kingdom of Armenia in 387 between Romans and Iran), and a small mountain city called Karin (Armenian: Կարին) or Carana (Ancient Greek: Κάρανα) was fortified. It became an important border fortress. This city was later (A.D. 415) renamed to Theodosiopolis (Ancient Greek: Θεοδοσιούπολις), in honour of Emperor Theodosius I. Standing on the crossroads of main trade routes in Asia Minor, the area was a centre of importance for Greeks, with Armenian majority and minorities like Syriac Christians, Jews, Assyrians and other. From the mid 3rd century AD and afterwards, the territory was dominated by and incorporated into the Sasanian Empire, although it occasionally briefly fell under the rule of the neighboring Byzantine Empire as well. From the mid 7th century AD, the Arabs frequently clashed with the Byzantine Empire, including over the region. Between the seventh and eighth centuries, Arabs and Byzantines alternately held the region in their power, local Armenian rulers played a significant role in these events. The city (present day Erzurum) was alternatively held by the Arabs and Byzantines during the 7-10th centuries it was also part of the Georgian kingdom of Tao-Klarjeti in the 10th century. Threatened and later devastated and looted by the Seljuk Turks in 1049, the old city of Erzen was conquered, but Theodosiopolis survived the invasion until it was captured some time later. From the year 1101 onward it is documented that the ruling dynasty of the Saltukids held the town and much of the surrounding area in their power. Theodosiopolis repelled many attacks and military campaigns by the Seljuks of Rum and Georgians (the latter knew the city as Karnu-Kalaki) until 1201 when the city and province were conquered by the Seljuk sultan Süleiman II of Rüm. Erzen-Erzurum fell to the Mongol siege in 1242, and the city was looted and devastated. After the fall of the Seljuk Sultanate of Anatolia (Rum) in the early 14th century, it became an administrative province of the Ilkhanate, and after their fall, became part of the Çoban beylik, Black Sheep Turkmen, Mongols led by Timur Lenk, the White Sheep Turkmen and the rising Iranian Safavids captured the town in 1502 from the Aq Qoyunlu.

=== In the Ottoman Empire ===
In 1514, the region was conquered by the Ottoman Sultan Selim I following the Battle of Chaldiran. During the Ottoman reign, the city Erzurum served as the main base of Ottoman military power in the region and as the capital of the province. Early in the 17th century, the province was threatened again and taken by Safavid Iran while enduring also a revolt by the province governor Abaza Mehmed Pasha. This revolt was combined with Jelali Revolts (the uprising of the provincial musketeers called the Celali), backed by Safavid Iran and lasted until 1628. However, Iran would reconquer it again, only this time under Nader Shah in the first half of the 18th century.

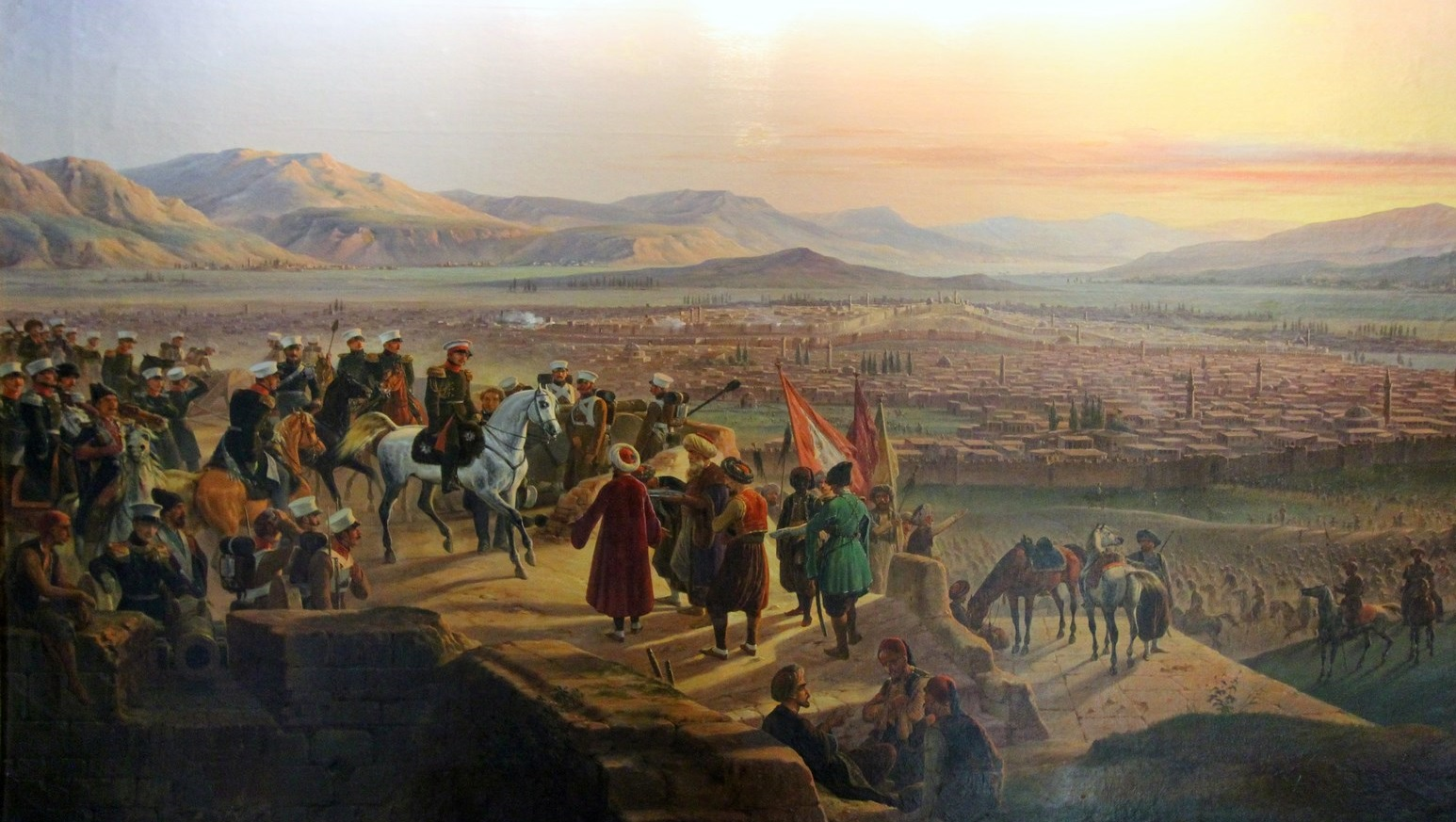
The capture of Erzurum by Ivan Paskevich on 27 June 1829

The Ottomans were routed by the Iranian Qajars in the 1821 battle at the city of Erzurum. The city was conquered by the Russian army in 1829, given back to the Ottoman Empire with the Treaty of Adrianople (Edirne). The poet Alexander Pushkin accompanied the Russian commander-in-chief, Ivan Paskevich, during that expedition and penned a brief account of the campaign. The city was again assaulted by the Russian army in the last Russo-Turkish War in 1877.

Beginning in late 1914 and picking up in the summer of 1915, the province saw the wholesale extermination of the Armenian population by state-sponsored forces as part of the Armenian genocide.

The province was the site of the major fighting during Caucasus Campaign of World War I between Russian and Ottoman forces including the key confrontation of the campaign, Battle of Erzurum which resulted in capture of Erzurum by Russian army under the command of Grand Duke Nicholas Nikolaevich on 16 February 1916. It was returned to the Ottomans with the Treaty of Brest-Litovsk in 1918. Erzurum was also a main Turkish base during the Turkish War of Independence and the Erzurum congress of Turkish nationalists was held here in 1919. It was declared a province of Turkey in 1924.

=== In Turkey ===
In September 1935 the third Inspectorate General (Umumi Müfettişlik, UM) was created. The third UM span over the provinces of Erzurum, Artvin, Rize, Trabzon, Kars Gümüşhane, Erzincan and Ağrı. Its capital was to be in the city of Erzurum and it was governed by an Inspector General. The Inspectorate General was dissolved in 1952 during the Government of the Democrat Party.

== Economy ==
Historically, Erzurum produced wheat and linseed; as of 1920, annual production of linseed grossed between 1,000 and 1,500 tons. Honey was also produced for local use.

Approximately 18.5% of the total surface area is arable land, of which about 75% has permanent crops. A large portion of the agricultural produce comprises cereals. Forested areas occupy 8.8% of the total surface area, with forestry a local industry. Industries largely consist of manufacturing of forestry, agriculture, husbandry, chemistry, textile and mining products. There are 81 active industrial plants in the province, most of them located at the central district of Erzurum, and are small and medium enterprises. Due to their relatively small sizes, these industries mainly serve local markets causing lower capacity usage, low productivity and unemployment. About 40 plants are currently out of use, mostly due to high operating costs.

The province of Erzurum has the highest ratio of meadows and pastures in Turkey, ideal for livestock. However, once the main occupation, animal husbandry lost its importance in the 1980s with the introduction of a liberal economy and the importation of animal products. A large organized industrial park concentrating on processing meat is being built with the hope of reviving this sector. Food industries include beekeeping and trout farming.

Mining resources include lead, copper, chromium, and zinc, the reserves of which are almost exhausted. There is a considerable amount of lignite, however because its ash and sulfur ratios are high, it suitable only for industrial use. Magnesite, fire clay, gypsum, manganese, diatomite, marble, rock salt and perlite are also present. The few natural geothermal resources, except one, are not suitable for economic investments, and they are used as natural springs.

The gross domestic product GDP of Erzurum is US$1.16 billion, constituting less than 1% of the total and ranking 40th among Turkish provinces (1997 values).

Transportation is possible via paved and unpaved highways. The Erzurum international airport is open for commercial flights and is also used by the Turkish Air Force. The runways of this airport are the second longest in Turkey. Erzurum is also the main railroad hub in the Eastern Anatolia Region.

The largest contributor to the provincial economy, in recent years, has been Atatürk University, which is also one of the largest universities in Turkey, having more than forty thousand students. Tourist activities, which include skiing, rafting, and mountaineering, also provide a substantial proportion of the province's income. Skiing is centered on Palandöken Mountain.

== Places of interest ==
- Öşvank (Oshk Vank) Historical Georgian Monastery church, Uzundere.
- Bana cathedral, also known as the Penek cathedral
- Oltu Russian cathedral, also known as Oltu Rus Kilisesi
- Haho Khakhuli Monastery, also known as Haho Bağbaşı Kilisesi, is a Georgian Orthodox monastery in historical Medieval Georgian Kingdom of Tao, located in Tortum.
- Erzurum Castle

== Notable people ==
- İbrahim Hakkı Erzurumi, Ottoman poet and writer of the Marifetname poetry book
- Erzurumlu Emrah, ashik and poet
- Mehmed Kırkıncı, student of Said Nursi and leader of the Nur movement
- İbrahim Erkal, bestselling Turkish classical music and Fantezi music artist, composer, songwriter and oud player
- Salt Bae, butcher chef and restaurateur
