= Uzundere =

- District and municipality
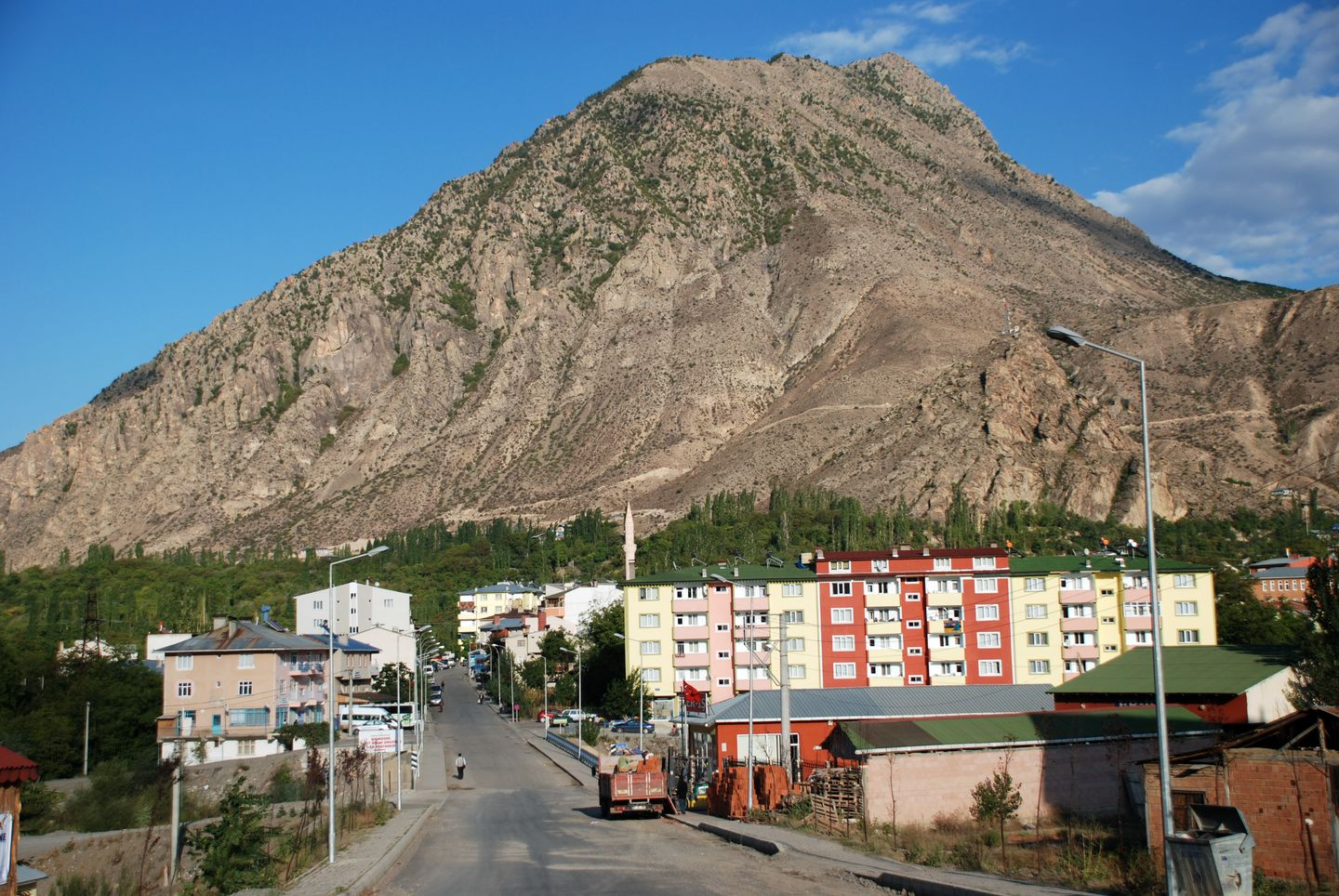

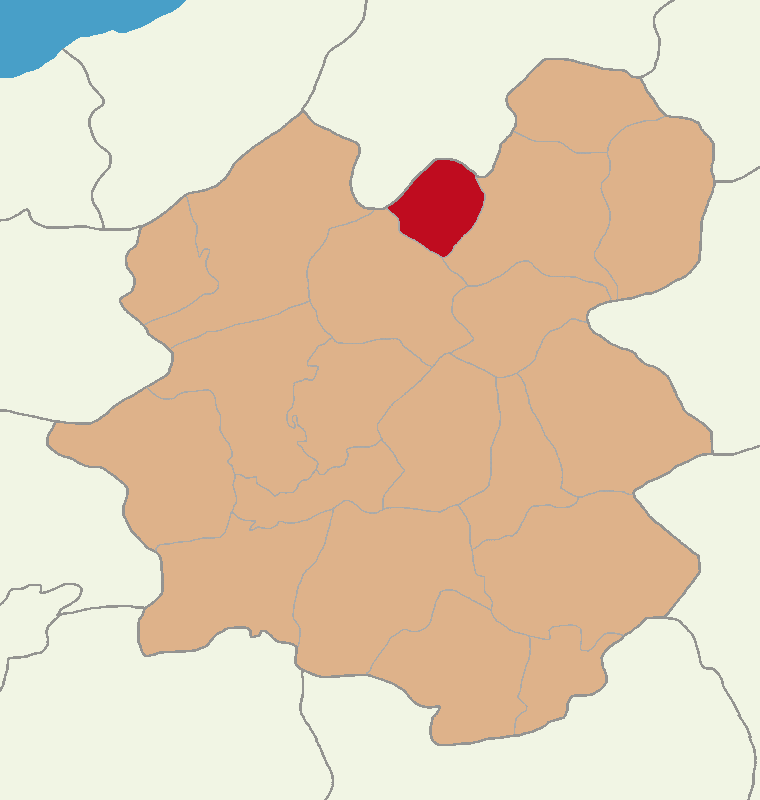
- Map showing Uzundere District in Erzurum Province

- Location within Turkey
- Coordinates: 40°32′11″N 41°32′54″E
- Country: Turkey
- Province: Erzurum

Government
  - Mayor: Muhammet Halis Özsoy (BBP)
- Area: 505 km^{2} (195 sq mi)
- Population (2022): 7,625
  - Density: 15.1/km^{2} (39.1/sq mi)
- Time zone: UTC+3 (TRT)
- Postal code: 25440
- Area code: 0442
- Climate: Cfa
- Website: www.uzundere.bel.tr

Uzundere (Armenian: Ազորդ, romanized: Azord) is a municipality and district of Erzurum Province, Turkey. Its area is 505 km^{2}, and its population is 7,625 (2022). The mayor is Muhammet Halis Özsoy (BBP).

== Visitor attraction ==
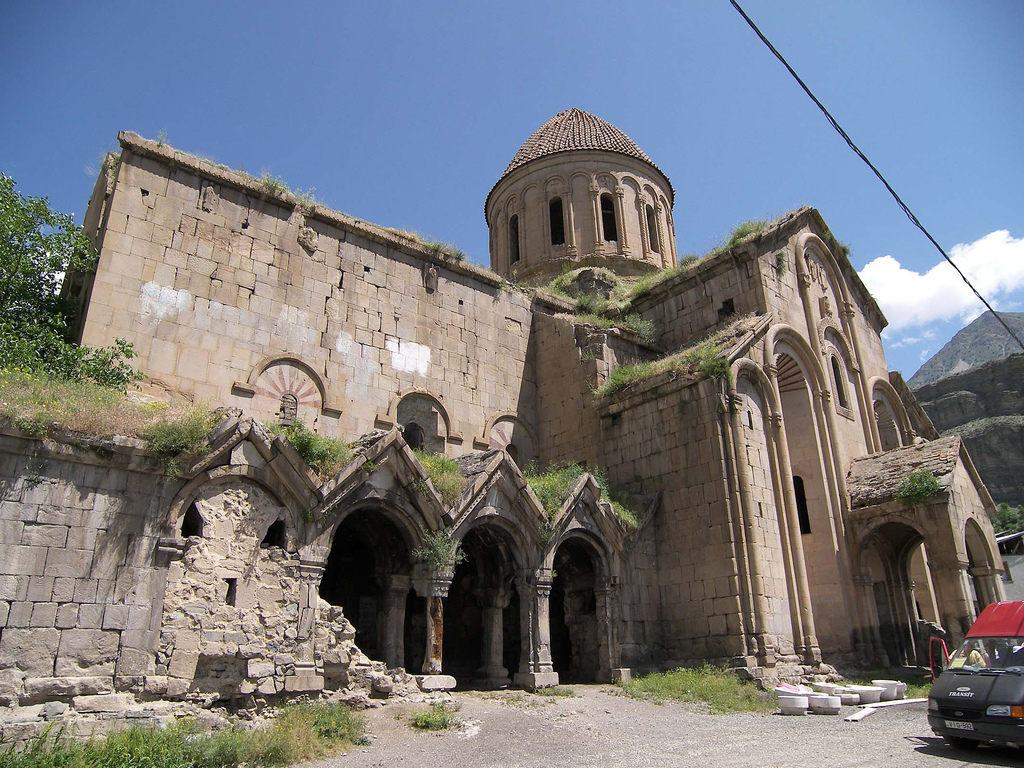
Monastery of Oshki

Oshki, a historic Georgian Orthodox monastery from the second half of the 10th century.

== Composition ==
There are 18 neighbourhoods in Uzundere District:

- Altınçanak
- Balıklı
- Çağlayan
- Çamlıyamaç
- Çaybaşı
- Cevizli
- Cömertler
- Dikyar
- Erikli
- Gölbaşı
- Kirazlı
- Merkez
- Muratefendi
- Sapaca
- Seyitefendi
- Ulubağ
- Uzundere
- Yayla
