= Oshki =

Georgian Orthodox monastery in Erzurum, Turkey

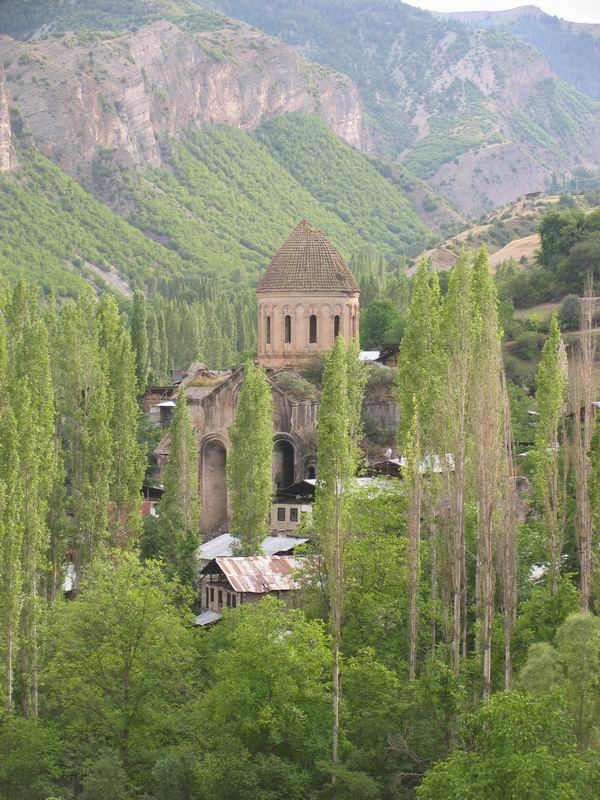
- Oshki (963-973), church of St John the Baptist, from the east

- Location within Turkey

Religion
- Affiliation: Georgian Orthodox Church

Location
- Location: Çamlıyamaç, Uzundere district, Erzurum Province, Turkey
- Coordinates: 40.613712°N 41.542111°E

Architecture
- Architect: Grigol
- Style: Georgian
- Groundbreaking: 963
- Completed: 973

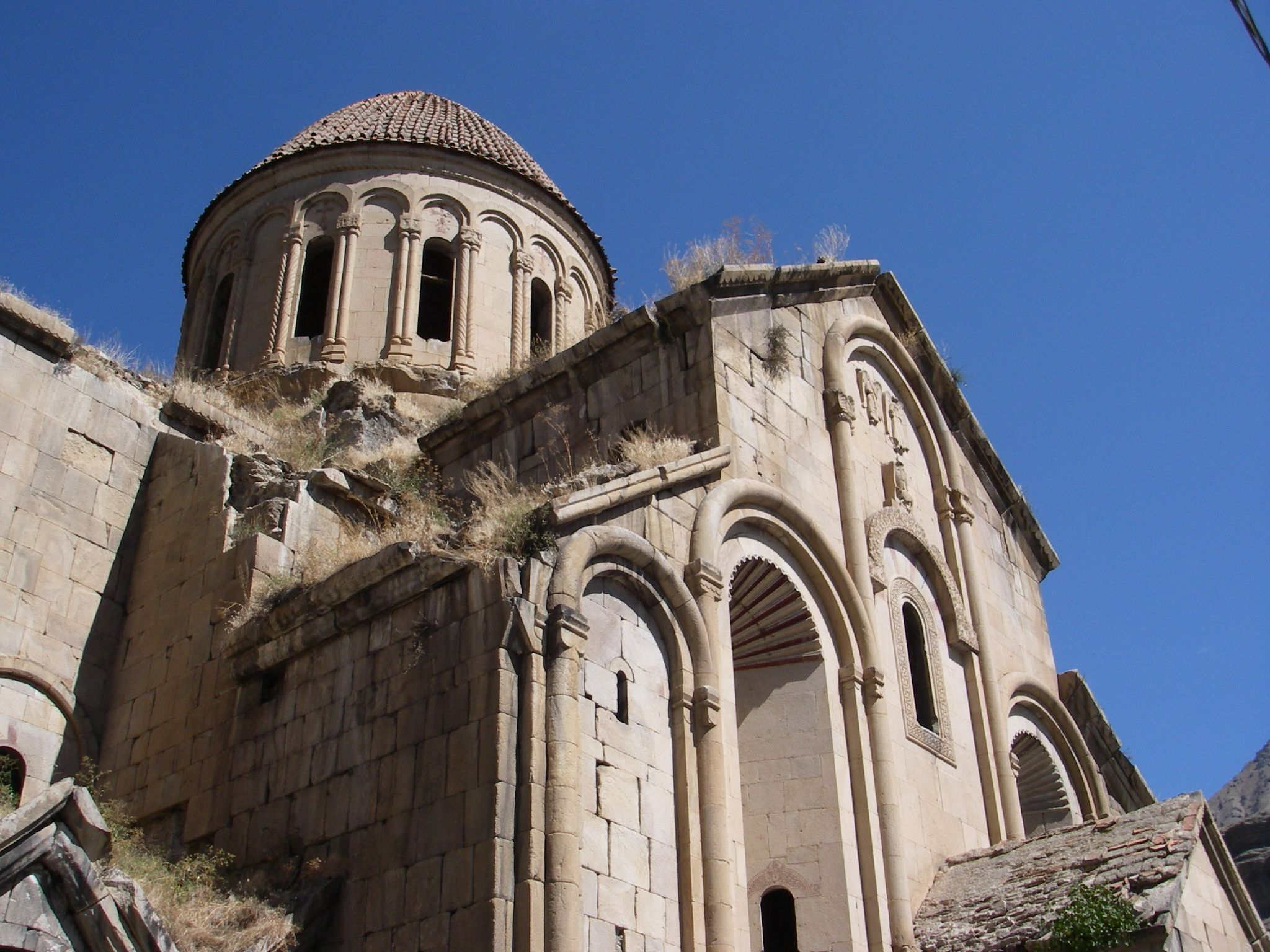
Monastery of Oshki

Oshki (Georgian: ოშკი Oshki [o̞ʃkʼi]; Turkish: Öşkvank Manastırı or Oşki Manastırı) is a Georgian Eastern Orthodox monastery from the second half of the 10th century located in the historic province of Tao, now part of the territory of Turkey. The main church, dedicated to St John the Baptist, was built between 963 and 973. The monastery is located in the village of Çamlıyamaç, in northeastern Erzurum Province, bordering Artvin Province.

Oshki monastery was a major centre of Georgian literature and enlightenment during the Middle Ages. The monastery is considered "one of the largest and architecturally most complex buildings produced anywhere in the Eastern Christian world."

It is considered one of the four Great Cathedrals of the Georgian Orthodox world.

== Architectural sculpture and figurative reliefs ==
The construction of the monastery at Oshki was sponsored by the Grand duke/King Bagrat II of Tao and David III of Tao.

The blind arches are an important part of the whole decoration. In Oshki they stretch along the outer walls of the church in the south, east and north. It is an early example of the use of decorative blind arches on the facades. They divide the wall in line with the general architectural rhythm. The central part of the facade is mainly decorated with bas-reliefs.

Bas-reliefs, placed high above the central arch, are given the place of honour on the southern facade, which is the main facade of the church. They stand out from the flat surface. The eagle with an animal in his talons probably symbolises victory, and the whole sculptural composition the triumph of the heavenly forces represented by the archangels Michael and Gabriel.

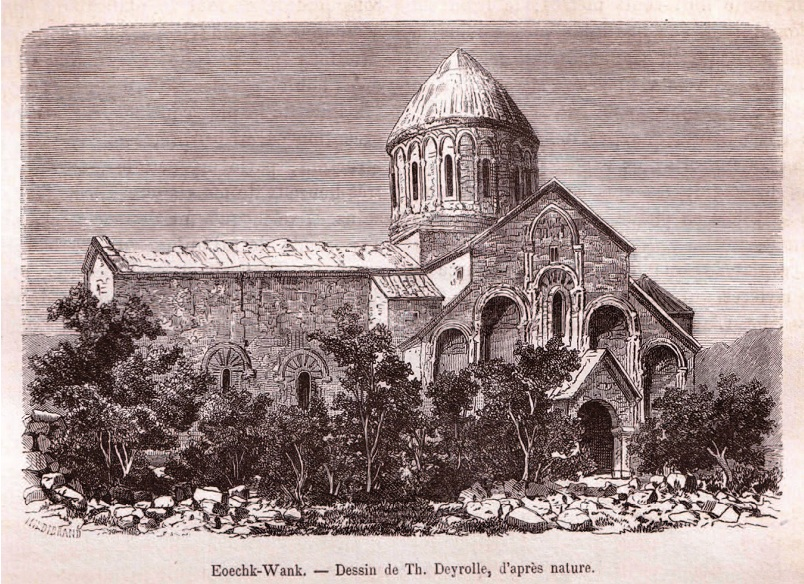
Engravings from Le Tour du Monde based on drawing by Théophile Deyrolle, who traveled in Turkey and Georgia in the 1870s, documenting, among other things, medieval Georgian monuments on the territory of the Ottoman Empire.

The Refectory of the Georgian church, Oshki

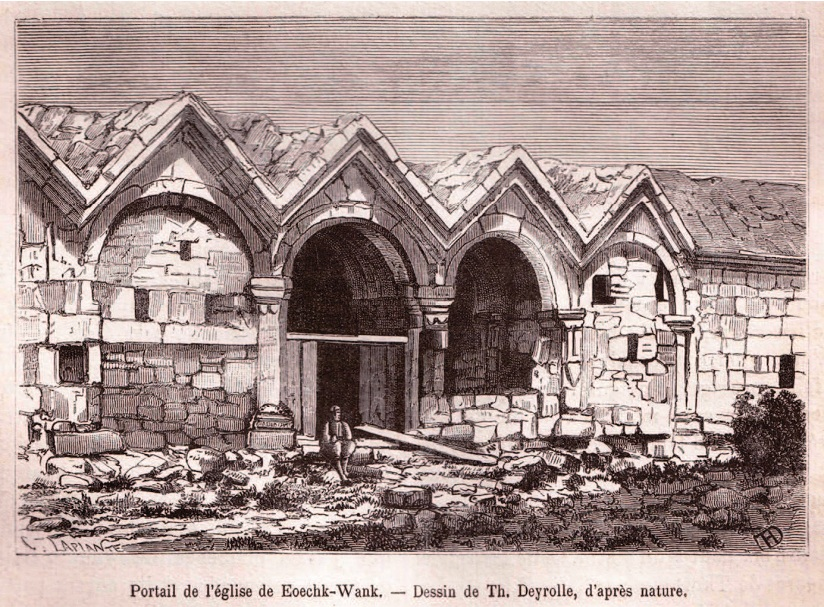
Engravings from Le Tour du Monde based on drawing by Théophile Deyrolle, who traveled in Turkey and Georgia in the 1870s, documenting, among other things, medieval Georgian monuments on the territory of the Ottoman Empire.

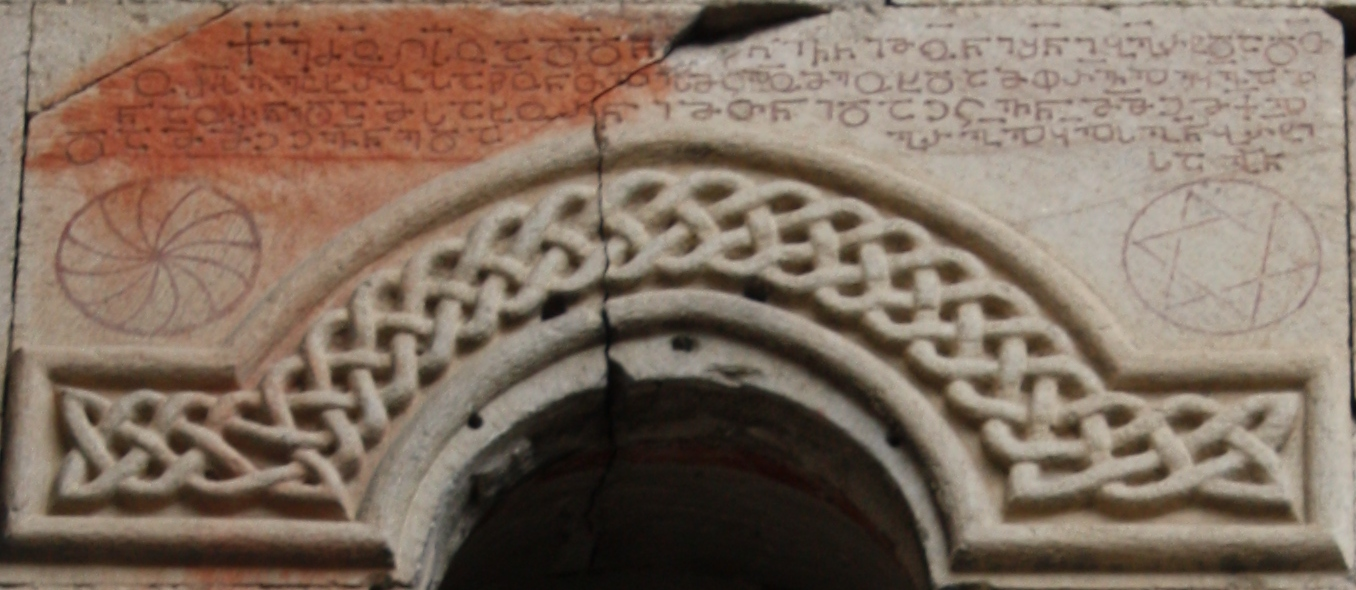
The six-pointed star (Star of David) and Borjgali in Oshki

In the province of Tao the power lay in the hands of the ruling dynasty of the Bagrationi, whose members Bagrat eristavt-eristavi and David Magistros are depicted lower down on the same facade, near the deesis, to show that the heavenly forces were the family's patrons. The figures are well proportioned, elegant in contour and form. The static postures of earlier donor portraits give way to free movement, and an equal attempt can be traced in the near three-dimensional renderings of the archangels and the deesis of the southern facade, as well as on a column in the southern gallery. The decorative system of the Oshki church also includes the low reliefs characteristic of the so-called transitional period in medieval Georgian art (8th – 10th centuries), when the old style had not yet given way completely, and new ways were evolving. Sculptors of the different generations must have worked on it. The church in Oshki already shows the tendencies that would eventually develop in the 11th century.

== Name and Etymology ==
There are two different views regarding the etymology of the place name ოშკი (ošḳi; IPA: [ɔʃkʼi]); according to Kakha Shengelia and Valeri Silogava the word ოშკი (ošḳi) derives from Megrelian word შქა (shka), meaning "being in the middle"; according to Merab Chukhua, is Laz word and means "dog rose" (rosa canina), which corresponds to Georgian ასკილი (asḳili) and Kartvelian *ასკილ- (*asḳil-). In Armenian and Turkish languages this monastery is named "Oshk vank" (from Armenian language vank "cathedral").

== Inscriptions ==
=== Inscription №1 ===
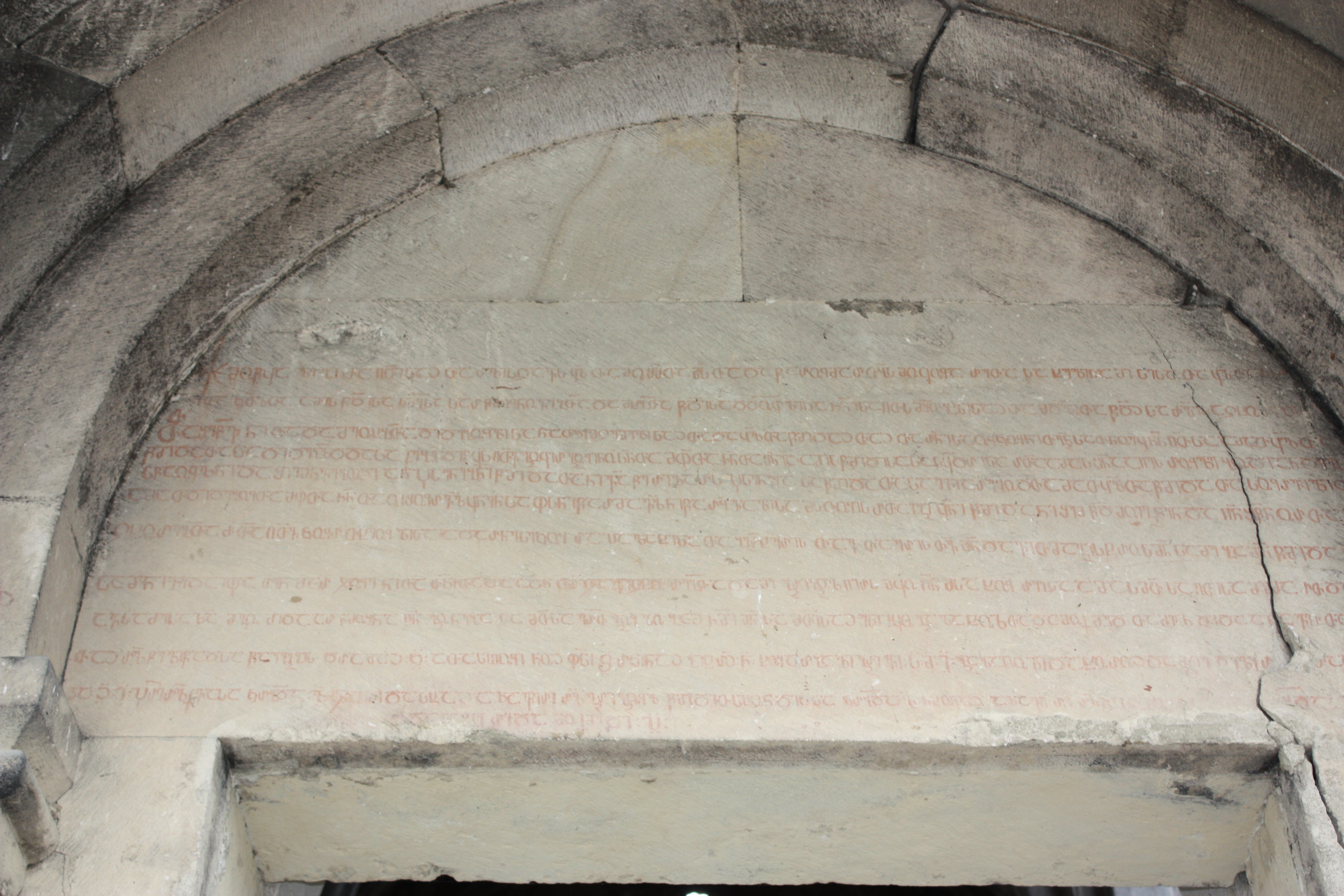
Inscription in Georgian language, telling who were builders of Oshki.

The first inscription in Oshki temple is drawn with Sanguri (Georgian: სანგური) color and is located over the southern main entrance to the temple. Nowadays 12 lines still exist. All inscriptions are written with Mrgvlovani, the earliest version of Georgian script. The original can be seen on the illustration in the right. The first scientist who explored this inscription was Marie-Félicité Brosset, a French orientalist who specialized in Georgian and Armenian studies. Later these inscriptions were researched by Ekvtime Takaishvili and Wachtang Djobadze. As noted by Wachtang Djobadze, the first inscription gives a lot of information about the temple. It mentions the names of Ktetors of the church – Georgian kings Bagrat Eristavt-Eristavi and David III of Tao. Also there is information about architect of the church – someone called Grigol.

1. მოწყალებითა ღ(მრ)თისაჲთა რ(ომე)ლი სცავს ყ(ოვე)ლთა მოშ(ი)შთა მ(ი)სთა და წარმოჳმართ(ე)ბს მოყოჳარეთა სახელისა მისისათა ყ(ოვე)ლთა ს(ა)ქმ(ე)
2. თა კ(ე)თ(ი)ლთა ამის წ(მი)დისა ს(ა)მ(ე)ბ(ი)სა სარწმოჳნოვებ(ი)თა და მ(ეო)ხ(ე)ბ(ი)თა წ(მი)დისა დ(ე)დოფლისა ჩ(უე)ნისა ღ(მრ)თ(ი)სმშობ(ე)ლისაჲთა მ(ა)დლითა წ(მი)დ(ა)ჲსა ძ(ე)ლისაცხოვრებისაჲ
3. თა შეწ(ე)ვნითა და მეოხ(ე)ბ(ი)თა დიდებოჳლისა ნათლი[ს]მცემლისაჲთა და ყ(ოვე)ლთა წმიდაჲთაჲთა რ(ომელ)ნი საოჳკოჳნითგ(ა)ნ სათნო ეყ(უ)ნ(ე)ს ღ(მერ)თსა ამათ ყ(ოვე)ლთა
4. წმიდათა სადიდებ(ე)ლ(ა)დ და საქებ(ე)ლ(ა) იწყ(ე)ს ღ(მრ)თივ გოჳრგოჳნოს(ა)ნთა მ(ე)ფ(თ)ა ჩ(უე)ნთა შ(ე)ნ(ე)ბ(ა)დ ამის წმიდისა ს(ა)ყდრისა რ(ა)თა ამას შ(ი)ნა აღესროჳლებოდიან დღესა
5. სწაოჳლნი და შეიმკვებოდიან ჴსენებ(ა)ნი წმიდათანი ვ(ითარც)ა წერილ არს ჴსენებასაწმიდათასა ეზიარებოდ(ე)თ ამათ ყ(ოვე)ლთა წმიდათა სოჳრვილითა
6. ამათ დიდეოჳ[ლ]თა მ(ე)ფ(ე)თა ჩ(უე)ნთა ოჳშოჳრვ(ე)ლ ყ(უ)ნენ საფას(ე)ნი წარმავ(ა)ლნი წარ[ო]ჳვალისა მ(ი)სთოჳის რ(ა)თა ყ(ოველ)ნი წმიდანი შემწ(ე)დ მოიგნენ და ღმერთმან შ(ეე)წ(იე)ნ ორთავე
7. ცხოვრებ(ა)თა ძ(ე)თა ღ(მრ)თ(ი)ვ კოჳრთხეოჳლისა ადარნასე კოჳრაპალატისატა ბ(ა)გრ(ა)ტ ერისთავთა ერისთ(ა)ვმ(ა)ნ დავით მაგისტროსმ(ა)ნ სამებამ(ა)ნ წმიდამან
8. სამნივე დაიფარენ მორჯოჳენითა თ(ჳ)სითა და ა(დი)დ(ე)ნ ორთავე ცხორებ(ა)თა და მე გრიგოლ ღირს მყო ღ(მრერთმა)ნ მსახოჳრებ(ა)სა ამას მ(ა)თსა ღ(მრ)თისა მიმართ და მე ვიყ
9. ავ სა[ქ]მესა ზ(ედ)ა-მ[დ]გომი და არწმოჳნა ღ(მერთმა)ნ გონებასა მ(ა)თსა ერთ-გოჳლობაჲ ჩ(ე)მი მ(ო)ნისა მ(ა)თისაჲ ესე იყო გალატოზთა და მოქმედთა მიზდი და აზავერთა მექოჳიშე
10. თაჲ რ(ომე)ელ წელიწადსა წარეგების დრამაჲ :კ: ათასი ღოჳინოჲ ფ(ისო)სი :ჭ: რკინაჲ ლიტრი :ნ: ხოჳარბალი გრივი :ს:მ:ი: გალატოზი და ხო[ჳ]როჲ და მჭედელი რ(ომე)[ლმა]რადის შ(უ)რებო
11. და ჲ:ი: ჴ(ა)რი რ(ომ)ელ ქვასა კრ(ე)ბდა :ლ: ჯორი და სხ(უ)აჲ აზავერი რ(ომე)ლ გრიგოჳლ-წმიდით სპონდიკსა კრ(ე)ბდა :ლ: სხოჳაჲ აზავერი რ(ომე)ლ [-] [კრ(ე)]ბდა :ჲ: [-]
12. ჲდა [-] [ყი]ერი და მოქმედი :პ:

== Gallery ==
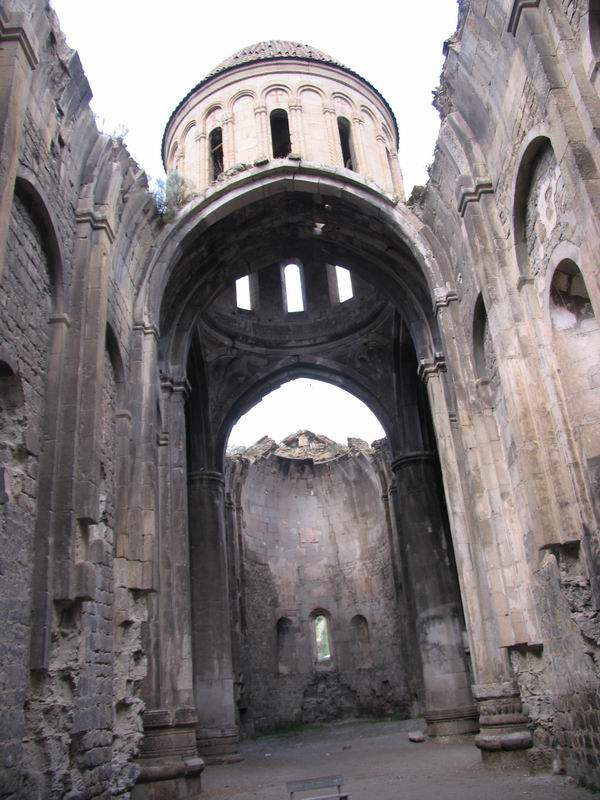
Oshki (963-973), interior, looking east into the main apse

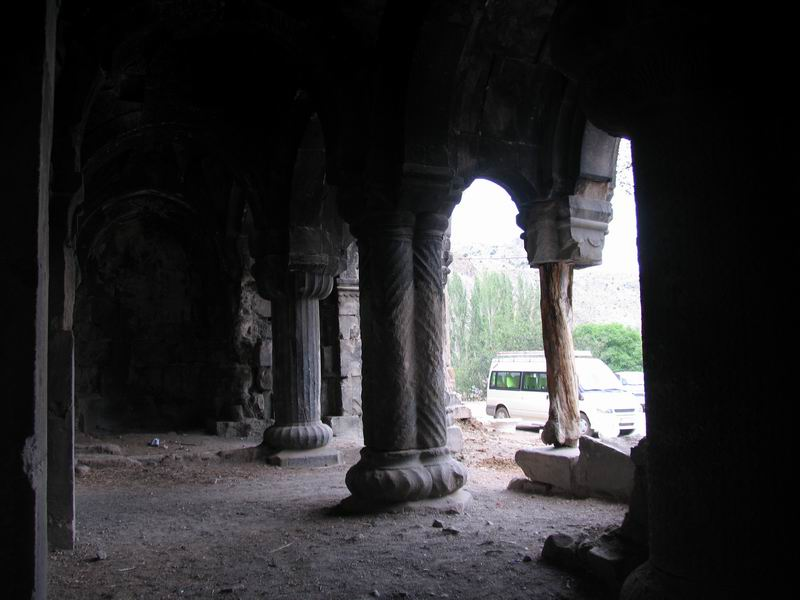
Oshki (963-973), south porch

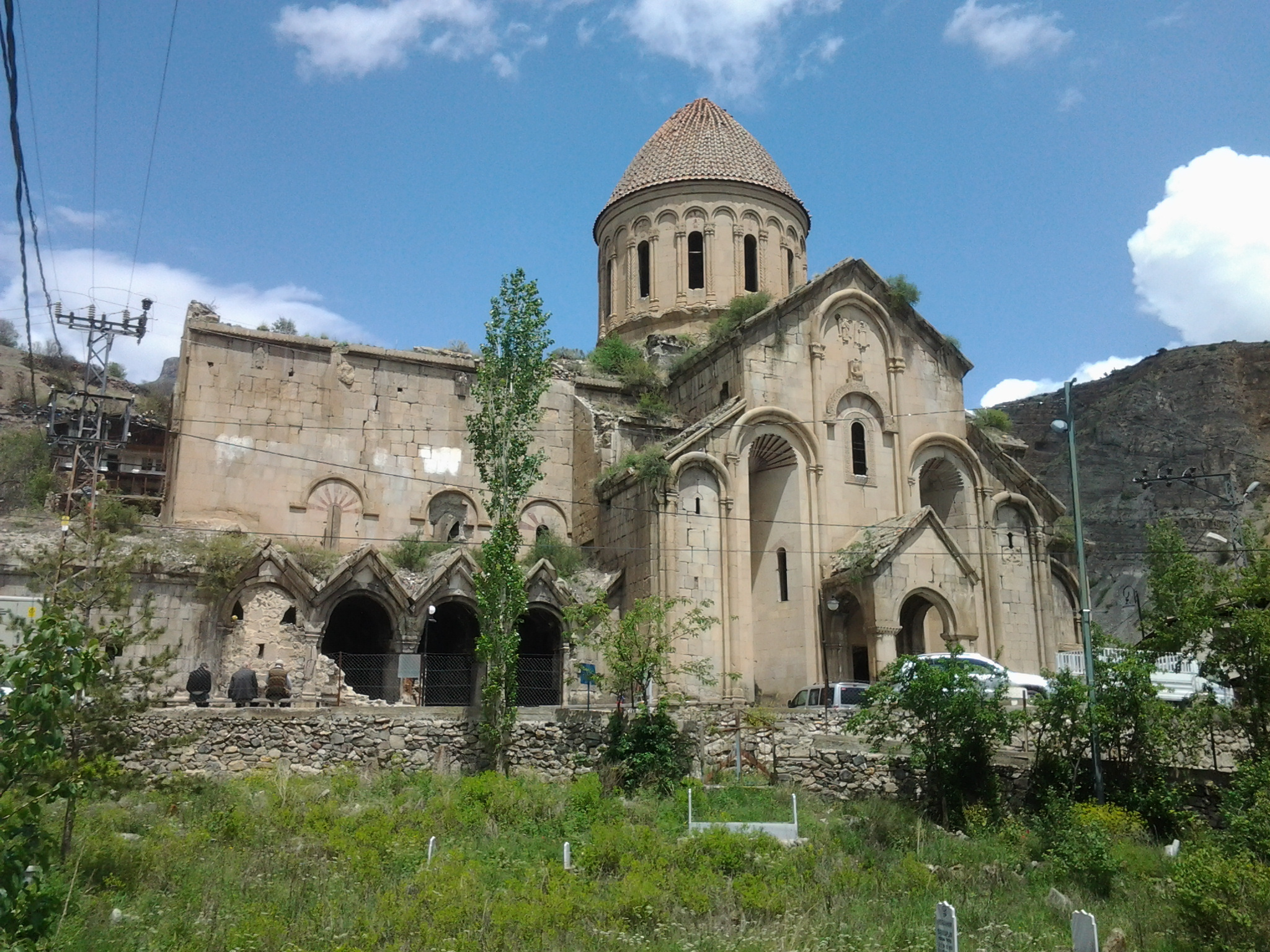
Oshki (963-973), church of St John the Baptist, south facade
