= Tortum Waterfall =

Coordinates: 40°39′25″N 41°39′31″E

- Interactive map of Tortum Waterfall

Location of Tortum Waterfall

The Tortum Waterfall is the tallest waterfall in Turkey. Since the completion of the Tortum Dam and Hydroelectric Plant in 1960, water is drawn from Tortum Lake through channels and tunnels, and allowed to rush down into the turbines. The waterfall is fed only from the surplus water and thus now functions only for a very short period during the months of May and June when the water level of the lake is exceptionally high. During the other months the bed of the waterfall is almost dry. The lake and waterfall are located in the Tortum district, 100 km (62 mi) north of Erzurum in Eastern Anatolia region.

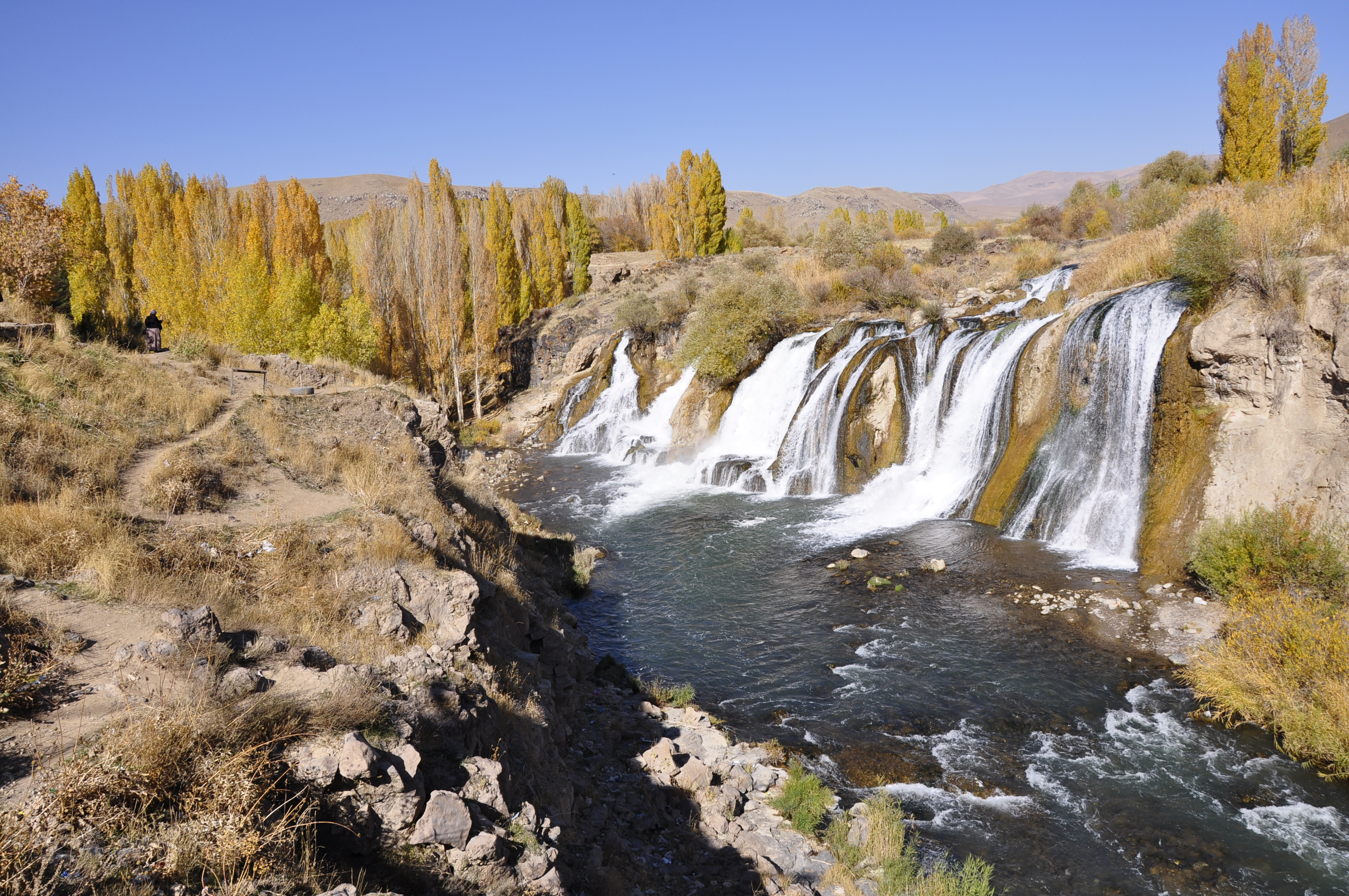
Tortum Waterfall in Eastern Turkey

== Tortum Lake ==
The lake, 8 km (5.0 mi) long and 1 km (0.62 mi) wide, was formed as the result of a landslide, which blocked the valley though which the Tortum River flowed. At the same time, the water sought a new outlet over a fault with a drop of 48 m (157 ft). The hollow left in the Kemerlidağ slope on the left of the valley by the fall of rock is still clearly visible. Tortum Lake is surrounded by limestone marls of the Cretaceous period. Earth pillars can be seen on the eastern shores of the lake. The view of the lake from the steep slopes along the edge is scenic. The maximum depth of the lake is 100 m (330 ft). The lake lies about 1,000 m (3,300 ft) above sea level.

Some geologists claim that the landslide that created the lake is a very old one. These experts, among whom are to be counted a number of foreign geologists, believe that the landslide took place at the end of the Quaternary period. Other opinions state that the landslide is comparatively recent, occurring only a few centuries ago.

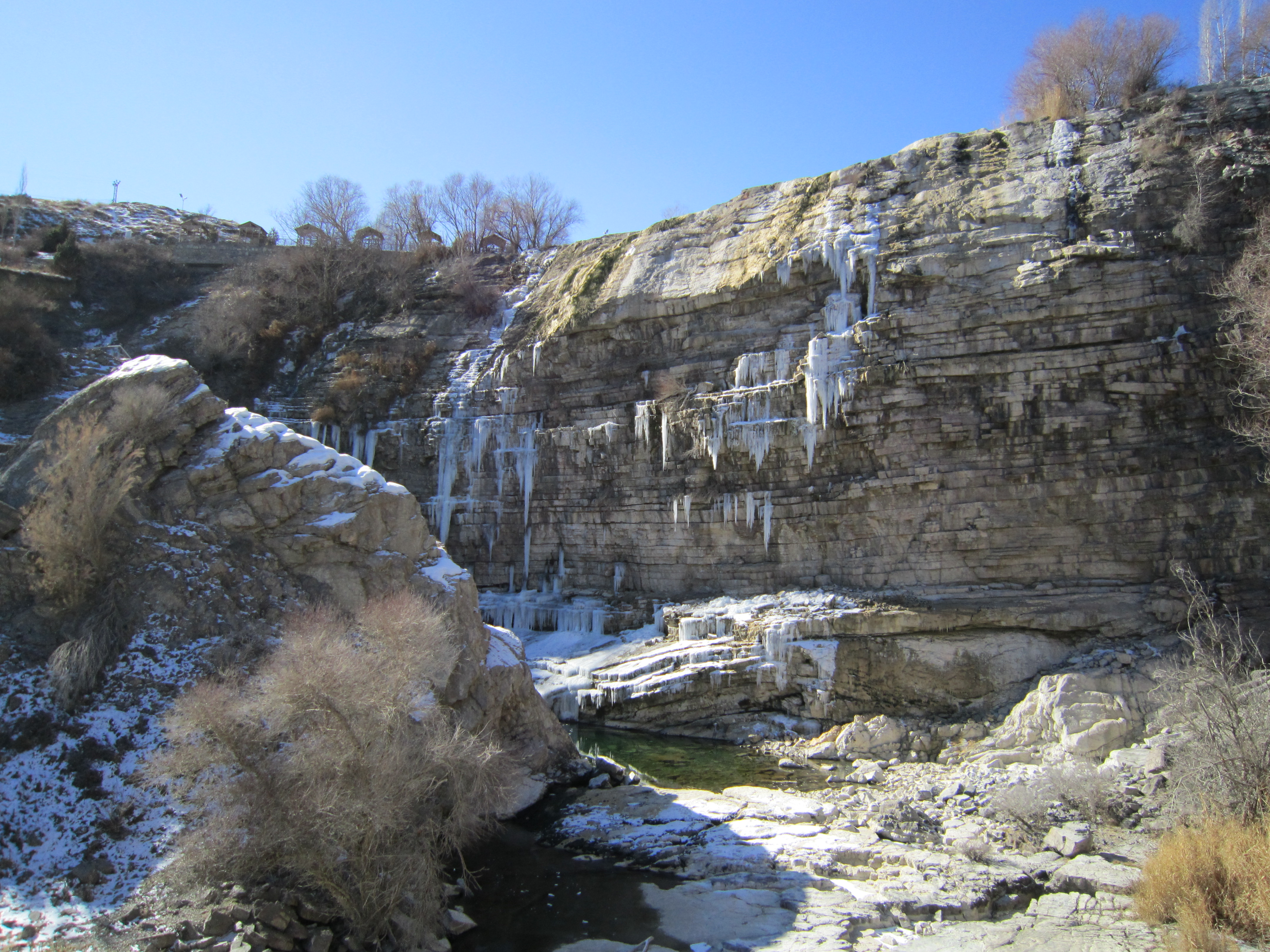
Tortum Waterfall in February

A recreation area around the waterfall with an observation platform allows visitors a close sightline to the waterfall. A staircase leads underneath the waterfall. After the waterfall (with its drop of 48 m (157 ft)), the river flows over a series of cascades until its arrival in the Tev Valley.

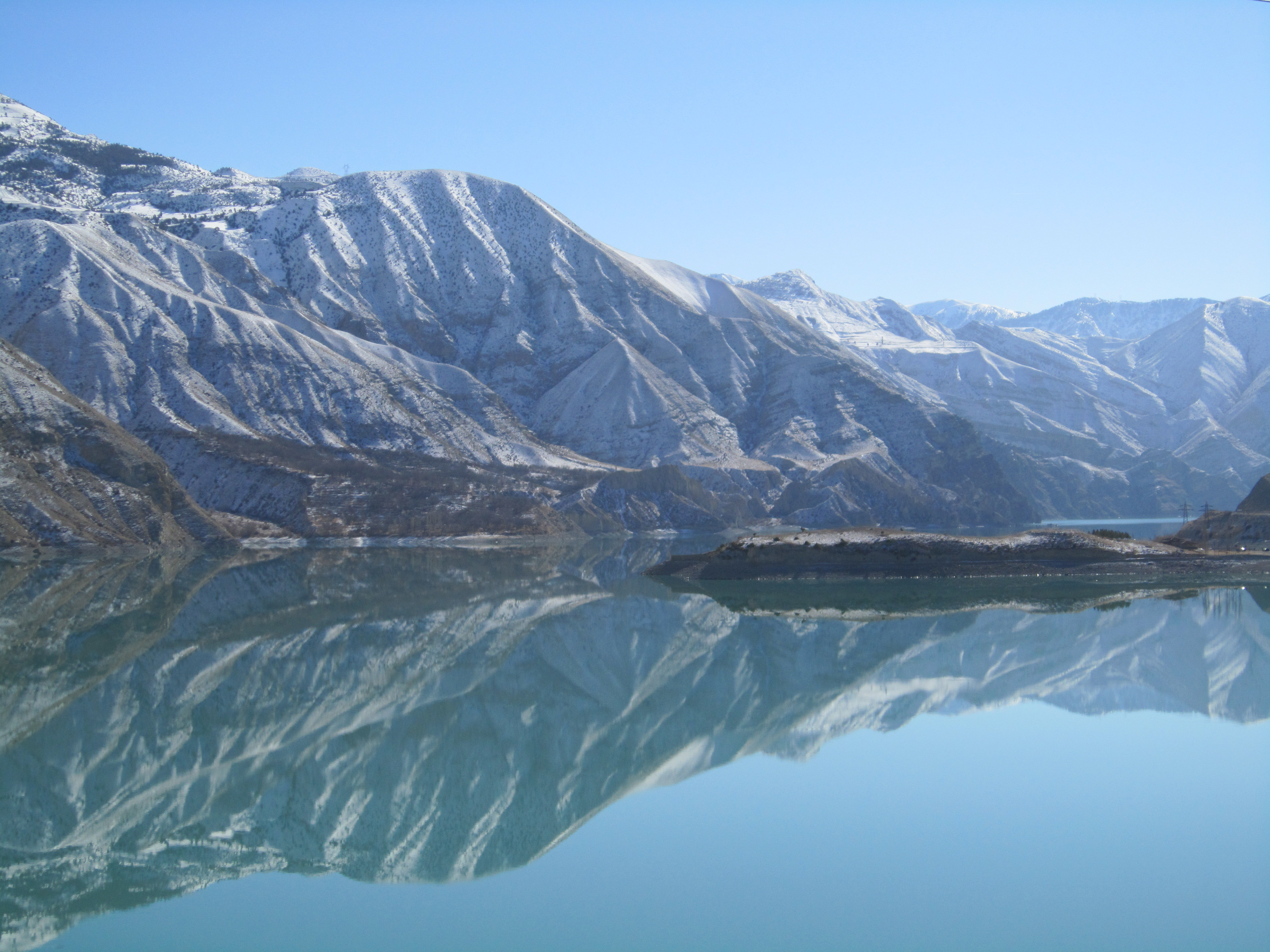
Tortum Lake in February

=== Smaller lakes ===
Four small lakes were formed on the rubble from the landslide by water seeping from underground through the material from the rock fall. The water of these lakes is remarkably clear and blue. These four lakes, Incegöl, Karagöl, Efendigilin Gölü and Nazlıgilin Gölü, contain large quantities of trout.

== See also ==
- List of waterfalls
- List of waterfalls in Turkey
