= Tortum =

- District and municipality
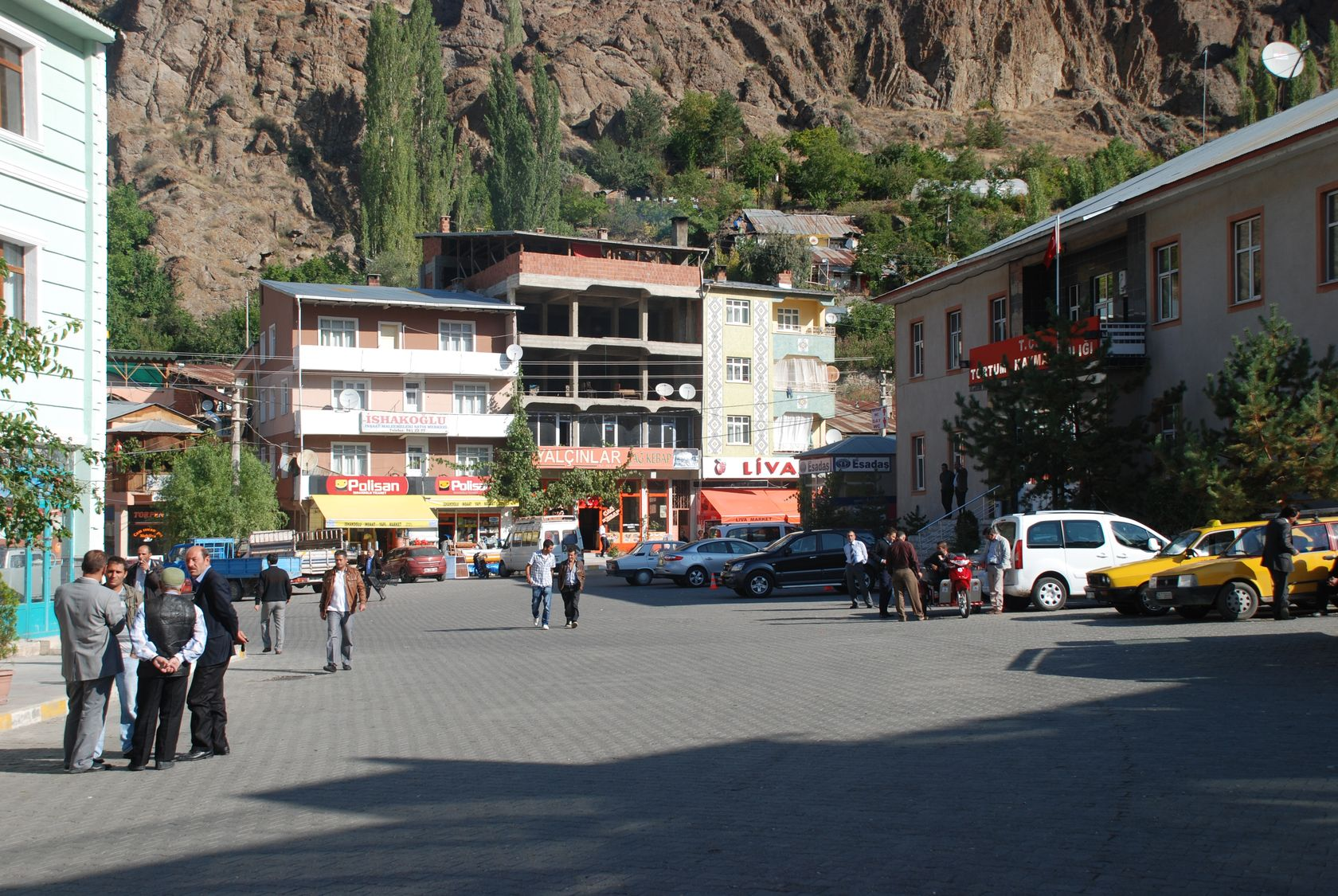
- Tortum town center

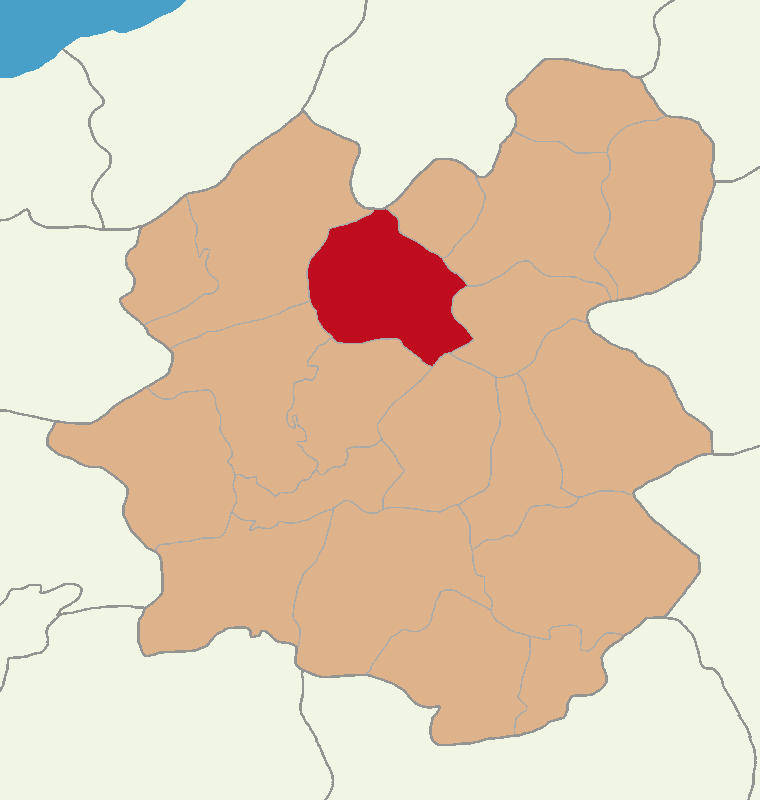
- Map showing Tortum District in Erzurum Province

- Location within Turkey
- Coordinates: 40°17′53″N 41°37′57″E
- Country: Turkey
- Province: Erzurum

Government
  - Mayor: Muammer Yiğider (AKP)
- Area: 1,463 km^{2} (565 sq mi)
- Population (2022): 15,259
  - Density: 10.43/km^{2} (27.01/sq mi)
- Time zone: UTC+3 (TRT)
- Postal code: 25430
- Area code: 0442
- Climate: Dfb
- Website: www.tortum.bel.tr

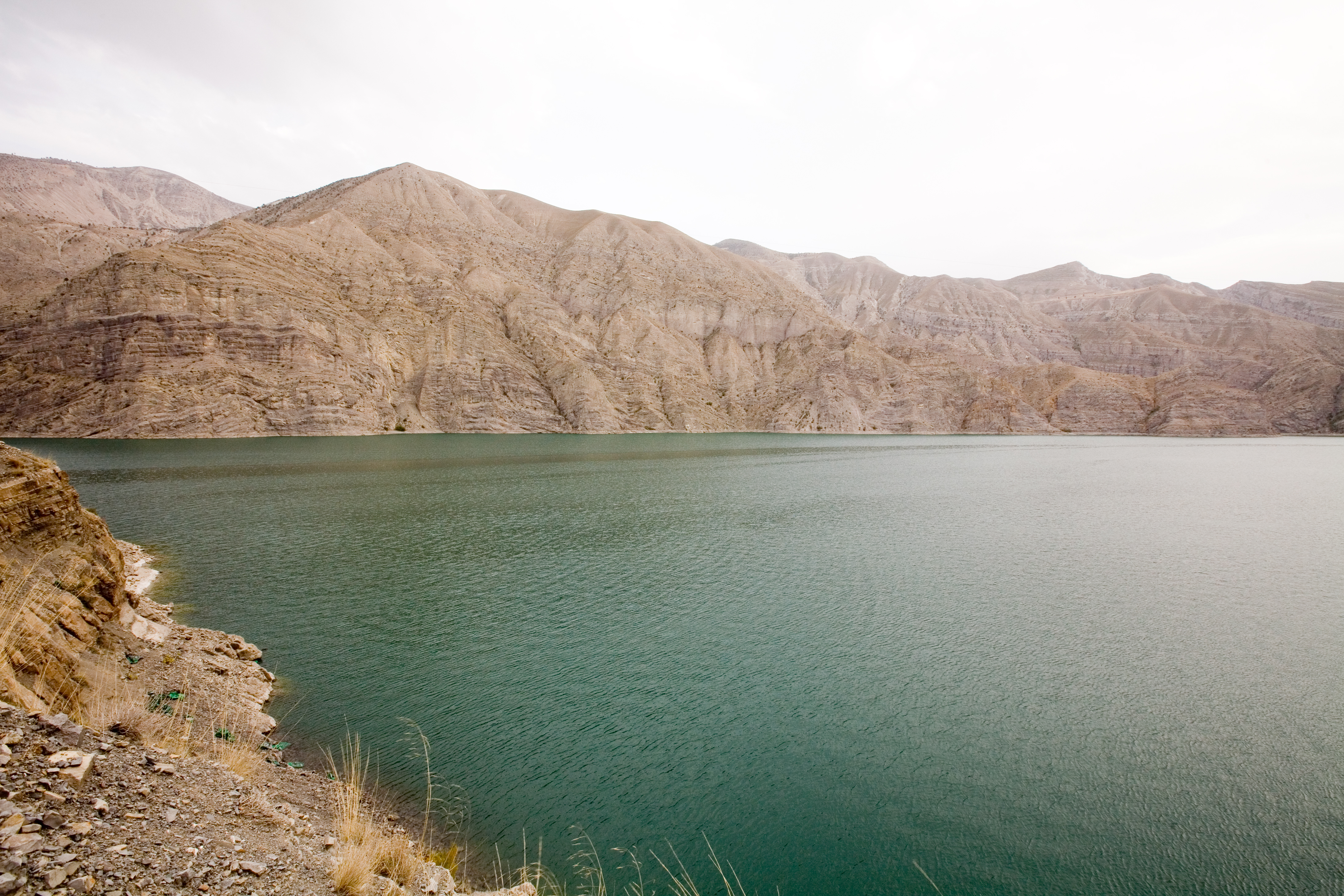
Tortum lake

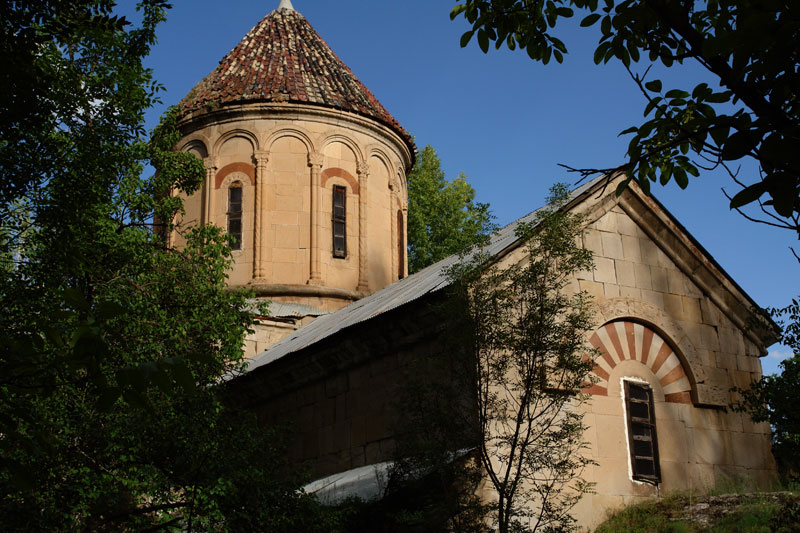
Khakhuli Monastery

Tortum (Ottoman Turkish: تورتوم; Armenian: Թորթում, romanized: Tortum; Georgian: თორთომი, romanized: tortomi) is a municipality and district of Erzurum Province, Turkey. Its area is 1,463 km^{2}, and its population is 15,259 (2022). The current mayor is Muammer Yiğider from the Justice and Development Party (AKP).

== History ==
Tortum was part of the area known as Diaueni, Tayk or Tao and was ruled by Hayasa-Azzians, Diauehi, Urartians, Iberians, Armenians, Romans, Persians and Byzantines. Tortum was a part of some proto-Armenian states (Hayasa-Azzi; Urartu), proto-Georgian Kingdom of Iberia (4th - 2nd centuries BC) and Kingdom of Greater Armenia (2nd century BC - 5th century). Between the 9th and 16th century it was part of the Kingdom of the Iberians, Kingdom of Georgia and Georgian principality of Samtskhe-Saatabago. It was first an Ottoman vassal in the early 16th century and was annexed in 1550. The area of Tortum was contested by the Safavids and the Ottoman Empire in the 16th-17th century but remained Ottoman after 1625. Georgians and Armenians made up the vast majority of the population in Tortum. During Georgian rule, half of the ethnic Armenian population became Chalcedonians and joined the Georgian Orthodox church, while the rest of the Armenians remained part of the Armenian church. Armenian cleric Hakop Karnetsi recorded in the 1650s that a man named Mullah Jaffar took census and placed heavy taxes in the region, causing the Armenian Chalcedonians to convert en-masse to Islam. Tortum was a sanjak in Erzurum Eyalet. The region was in the early Ottoman period largely Christian but acquired a Muslim majority in the mid 18th century, as the Georgian population fled to the inner provinces of Georgia. During World War I, Ottoman troops crossed Tortum in the disastrous Battle of Sarikamish. Then the Russians occupied the town and held it between 1915 and 1917. After the February revolution of 1917 they left it to the Armenians. The Ottoman army advanced some time later and captured Tortum on 16 March 1918. The town has a ruined citadel.

The Muslim Armenians continued to speak Armenian well into early the 19th century when they were Turkified.

== Climate ==
Climate data for Tortum(1991-2020)
Month	Jan	Feb	Mar	Apr	May	Jun	Jul	Aug	Sep	Oct	Nov	Dec	Year
Mean daily maximum °C (°F)	2.7 (36.9)	4 (39)	8.1 (46.6)	14.3 (57.7)	19.8 (67.6)	25 (77)	29.2 (84.6)	29.9 (85.8)	25.5 (77.9)	18.8 (65.8)	10.6 (51.1)	4.6 (40.3)	16.0 (60.9)
Daily mean °C (°F)	−3.1 (26.4)	−1.9 (28.6)	2.5 (36.5)	8 (46)	12.6 (54.7)	16.8 (62.2)	20.3 (68.5)	20.5 (68.9)	16 (61)	10.5 (50.9)	3.6 (38.5)	−1.3 (29.7)	8.7 (47.7)
Mean daily minimum °C (°F)	−7.9 (17.8)	−7 (19)	−2.6 (27.3)	2.2 (36.0)	6 (43)	9.1 (48.4)	12.5 (54.5)	12.4 (54.3)	7.7 (45.9)	3.7 (38.7)	−1.8 (28.8)	−6 (21)	2.4 (36.2)
Average precipitation mm (inches)	21.94 (0.86)	24.82 (0.98)	43.61 (1.72)	53.36 (2.10)	67.48 (2.66)	53.24 (2.10)	37.46 (1.47)	22.71 (0.89)	22.73 (0.89)	38.98 (1.53)	30.27 (1.19)	25.27 (0.99)	441.87 (17.38)
Average precipitation days (≥ 1 mm)	4.6	5.1	7	9.4	11.4	8.1	5.7	4.3	3.9	5.9	5.1	5	75.5
Average relative humidity (%)	64.8	62.7	60.3	58.2	58.6	56.6	54.4	54.1	55	62.5	63.5	66.4	59.8
Mean monthly sunshine hours	120.1	138.4	164.9	177.6	200.7	223.5	262.4	270.4	231.5	175.9	139.1	105.1	2,209.6
Source: NOAA NCEI

== Economy ==
As of 1920, Tortum was producing coal.

== Composition ==
There are 58 neighbourhoods in Tortum District:

- Akbaba
- Aksu
- Aktaş
- Alapınar
- Alpaslan
- Arılı
- Aşağı Serdarlı
- Bağbaşı
- Bahçeli
- Ballı
- Çakıllı
- Çamlıca
- Çardaklı
- Çataldere
- Çaylıca
- Çiftlik
- Cihanlı
- Çivilikaya
- Demirciler
- Derekapı
- Derinpınar
- Dikmen
- Doruklu
- Esendurak
- Gökdere
- Hamidiye
- İncedere
- Kaleboynu
- Kaledibi
- Kapıkaya
- Karlı
- Kazandere
- Kemerkaya
- Kireçli
- Kırmalı
- Konak
- Meydanlar
- Pehlivanlı
- Peynirli
- Şenyurt
- Serdarlı
- Sögütlü
- Suyatağı
- Taşbaşı
- Taşoluk
- Tatlısu
- Tipili
- Tortumkale
- Uzunkavak
- Vişneli
- Yağcılar
- Yamankaya
- Yavuz Sultan Selim
- Yazyurdu
- Yellitepe
- Yukarı Sivri
- Yumaklı
- Ziyaretli

== See also ==
- Cağ kebabı
- Khakhuli Monastery
- Tortum Waterfall
