= Taxation districts of the Achaemenid Empire =

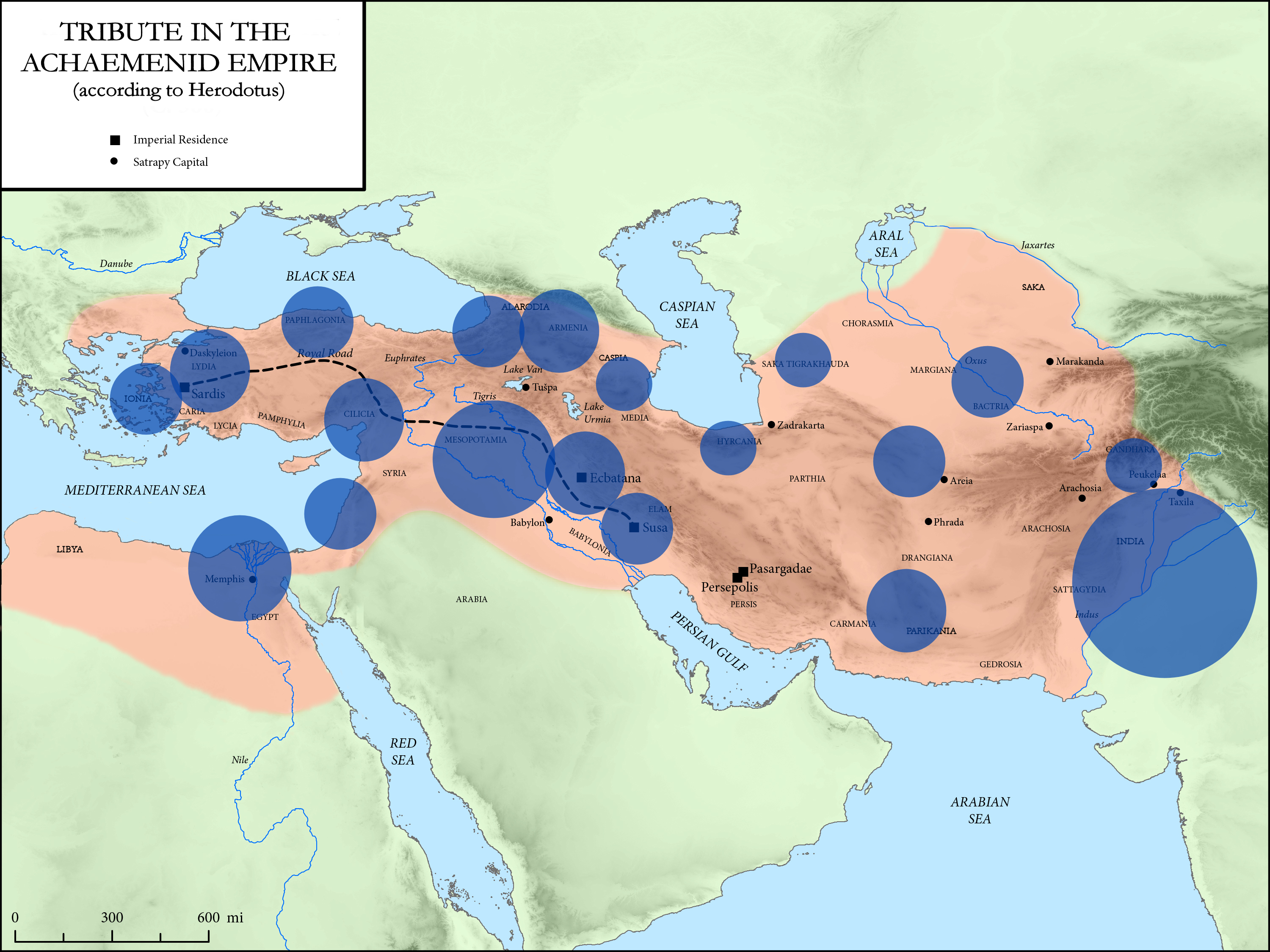
Volume of annual tribute per district, in the Achaemenid Empire.

Herodotus divided the Achaemenid Empire into 20 districts for the purpose of tribute payments. The following is a description of the ethnic makeup of the districts and the amount they paid in taxes, translated from Herodotus' Histories.

== Accounting units ==
The quantities of silver are given in Babylonian talent (1 Babylonian talent = about 30.3 kg), while the quantities of gold (India only) are given in Euboïc/Euboean talent (1 Euboïc talent = about 26 kg). Only the Hindush paid in gold, the exchange rate of gold to silver being 1 to 13 by weight at the time of Herodotus.

== Tax districts ==
The order of the districts given here follows Herodotus, Histories, III.90–94. In hellenocentric way it starts with Ionia and Mysia. The official Persian order of the provinces, as devised under Darius I in 518 BCE, was different and started from the Empire's capital: 1. Media, 2. Susa, etc. For comparison, it is given in the rightmost column.

District	Satrapies	Tribute per District	% of total	Darius's provinces
I	Ionians, Asian Magnesians, Aeolians, Carians, Lycians, Milyans, Pamphylians	400 Babylonian talents of silver	3.6%	10. Ionia
II	Mysians, Lydians, Lasonians, Cabalians, Hytennians	500 Babylonian talents of silver	4.5%	9. Lydia
III	Hellespontine Phrygians, Phrygians, Asian Thracians, Paphlagonians, Mariandynians, Syrians	360 Babylonian talents of silver	3.2%	8. Cappadocia
IV	Cilicians	500 Babylonian talents of silver along with 360 white horses (one for each day of the year); of the talents, 140 were used to maintain the cavalry force that guarded Cilicia	4.5%	11. "Sealand" (Cilicia and Cyprus)
V	The area from the town of Posidium as far as Egypt, omitting Arabian territory (which did not pay taxes). All of Yehud, Cyprus, and most of Phoenicia were herein contained. In the biblical Book of Ezra, this district is called Abar Nahara ("beyond the Euphrates river")	350 Babylonian talents of silver	3.1%	4. Assyria, 5. Arabia
VI	Egyptians and the Libyans in the border towns of Cyrene and Barca	700 Babylonian talents of silver, in addition to the money from the fish in Lake Moeris, and 120,000 bushels of grain for the Persian troops and their auxiliaries stationed in the White Castle at Memphis	6.3%	6. Egypt
VII	Sattagydians, Gandharans, Dadicae, Aparytae (Indian Satrapies)	170 Babylonian talents of silver	1.5%	19. Gandhara
VIII	Susa and the surrounding area, Cissia	300 Babylonian talents of silver	2.7%	2. Susiane
IX	Mesopotamia (Babylonia and Assyria)	1000 Babylonian talents of silver and 500 eunuch boys	9%	3. Mesopotamia
X	Ecbatana and the rest of Media along with the Paricanians and Orthocorybantians	450 Babylonian talents of silver	4%	1. Media
XI	Caspians, Pausicae, Pantimathi, and Daritae	a joint sum of 200 Babylonian talents of silver	1.8%	
XII	Bactrians and all neighboring peoples as far as the Aegli	360 Babylonian talents of silver	3.2%	15. Bactria
XIII	Pactyica, Armenians, and all the peoples as far as the Black Sea	400 Babylonian talents of silver	3.6%	7. Armenia
XIV	Sagartians, Sarangians, Thamanaeans, Utians, Myci, and the inhabitants of the Persian Gulf islands (where prisoners or displaced people were sent)	together they paid 600 Babylonian talents	3.6%	12. Sagartia
XV	the Sacae and the Caspians	250 Babylonian talents of silver	2.2%	
XVI	Parthians, Chorasmians, Sogdians, and Arians	300 Babylonian talents of silver	2.7%	13. Parthia, 14. Aria, 16. Sogdiane
XVII	Paricanians and Asiatic Ethiopians	400 Babylonian talents of silver	3.6%	20. Maka
XVIII	the Matienians, Saspires, Alarodians	200 Babylonian talents of silver	1.8%	
XIX	the Mushki, Tibareni, Macrones, Mossynoeci, Marres	300 Babylonian talents of silver	2.7%	
XX	India	360 Euboïc talents of gold dust, equivalent to 4680 Euboïc talents of silver, or 3600 Babylonian talents of silver.	32%	17. Arachosia, 18. India
Total	Total of all annual tributes, in Babylonian talent silver equivalent	11,200 Babylonian talents of silver, equivalent to 14,560 Euboïc talents of silver	100%	

== See also ==
- Achaemenid conquest of the Indus Valley
- Achaemenid Empire
- Satrapies

== General references ==
- Darius: List of Satrapies
- Map of Achaemenid satrapies by Ian Mladjov
