= Pantimathi =

The Pantimathi (Ancient Greek: Παντίμαθοι) were an anicient Iranian tribe that inhabited Caspiana during antiquity.

== History ==
Primary records of them survive thanks to the works of Herodotus, who included them in his famous list of peoples and tax districts of the Achaemenid Empire. During the 6th–5th centuries BCE, at the height of the empire, King Darius I conducted administrative reforms, dividing the state into satrapies. According to Herodotus, the Pantimathi were part of the 11th satrapy.

The Caspians, along with the Pausicae, Pantimathi, and Dareitai—all members of the 11th satrapy—lived as late as the post-Achaemenid period in Paytakaran (formerly known as the "Land of the Caspians" or Caspiana in ancient sources), neighboring the Vitii. While Herodotus' list of satrapies does not explicitly mention the Cadusii, they were evidently part of this 11th district; it is possible that the Pausikae, Pantimathi, and Daritae named here were distinct tribes of the Cadusii and other "Anariacae" who inhabited the Caspian territory between the lands of the Uti and Albani to the north and the Hyrcanians to the east.

Iris von Bredow suggested that the Pantimathi might have been part of a larger tribal union of the Cadusii—warlike highlanders living west of the Caspian Sea.
