= Paytakaran =

Historical province of the Kingdom of Armenia

Coordinates: 39.2333°N 48.4333°E

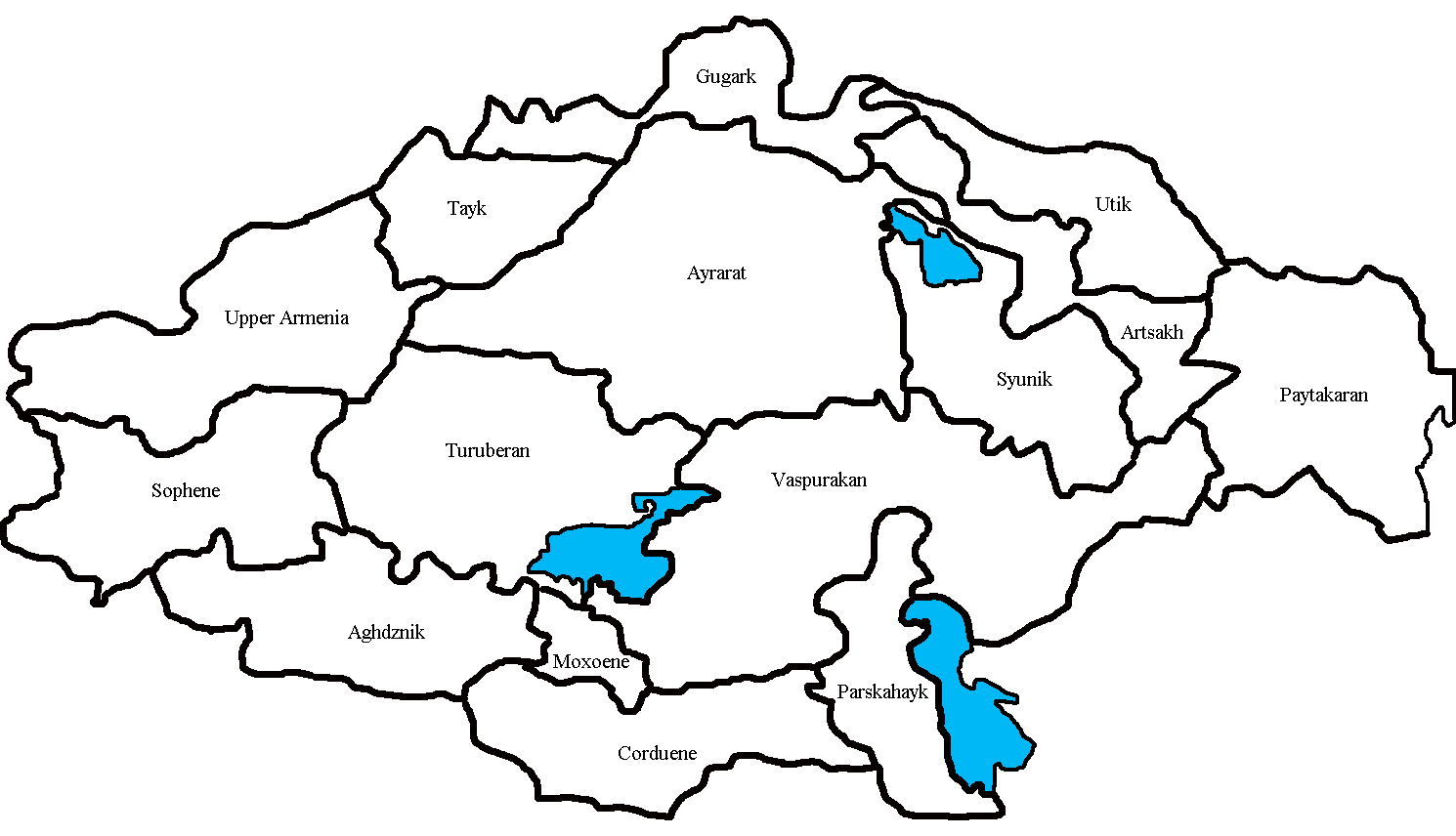
Paytakaran was the easternmost province of the Kingdom of Armenia.

Paytakaran (Armenian: Փայտակարան, romanized: Pʻaytakaran) was the easternmost province (nahang or ashkharh) of the Kingdom of Armenia. The province was located in the area of the lower courses of the Kura and Arax rivers, adjacent to the Caspian Sea. It corresponded to the territory known as Caspiane to Greco-Roman sources (Kaspkʻ or Kazbkʻ in Armenian sources). Today, the area is located in the territory of modern-day southeastern Azerbaijan and northwestern Iran. The centre of the province was the town of Paytakaran, after which it was named.

== Etymology ==
Anahit Perikhanian interprets Paytakaran as "the land of Pʻayt", applied by Medians to this territory to their north, from Median *karan- ("border, region, land", compare with Lankaran). Pʻayt is probably the name of a Caspian tribe. Pʻayt also means "wood" in Armenian, although Heinrich Hübschmann and others reject any connection with this word and believe the etymology to be non-Armenian. Hewsen suggests that the name is composed of Armenian pʻayt 'wood' and Middle Persian garān 'mountains', with the overall meaning 'wooded/forested mountains', appropriate for the Talysh range bordering the province on the south. In the classical Armenian sources, Paytakaran is mentioned as the name of the province only in the 7th-century geography Ashkharatsʻoytsʻ and the history of Ghevond, while the city of the same name is mentioned more frequently. Paytarakan/Caspiane/Kaspkʻ is also identified with the region of Balasagan (Baghasakan in Armenian).

== Geography ==
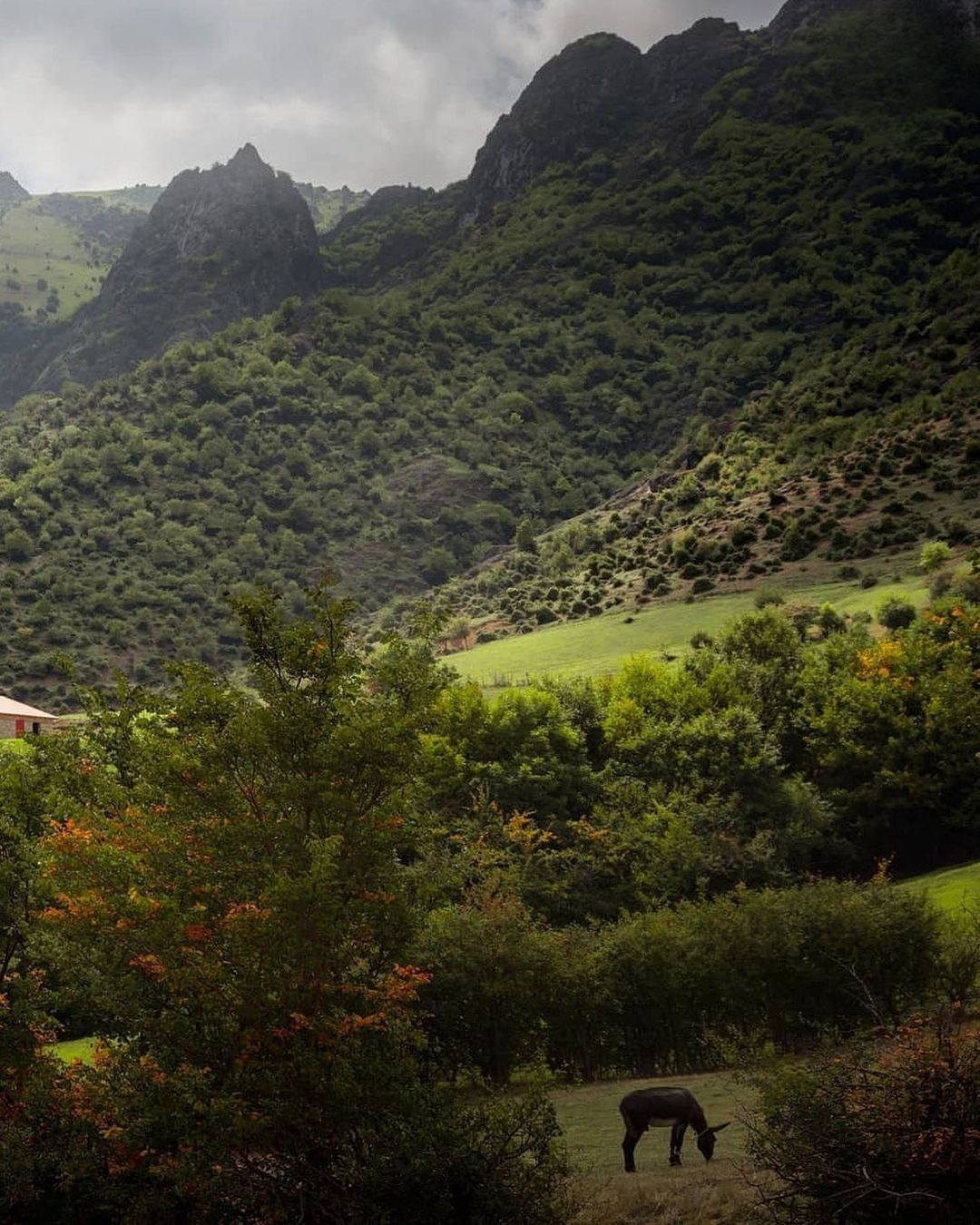
The Talysh mountain range formed the southern boundary of Paytakaran.

Paytarakan was located on the right bank of the Arax River, which separated it from the Armenian provinces of Artsakh, Siunik and Utik to the north, although some authors believe that it included territory on the left bank of the Arax as well. It was separated from Adurbadagan to the south by the Karadagh and Talysh mountains and bordered the Caspian Sea to the east. Robert H. Hewsen cites the Karadagh range "where it culminates in Mt. Yashtasar, probably the Mt. Iasonion of Strabo (XI.13.10)" as its probable western boundary and the Talysh range as the southern boundary. Its southern boundary was the southeasternmost border of Armenia, with the border touching the Caspian Sea somewhere around modern Astara (on today's Iran–Azerbaijan border). It is believed to have encompassed the greater part of the Mughan Plain and the Lankaran Lowlands. Paytakaran had a dry climate and is described in Ashkharatsʻoytsʻ as rich in cotton and wild barley. Suren Yeremyan estimates its area as 21,000 square kilometres.

=== Cantons ===
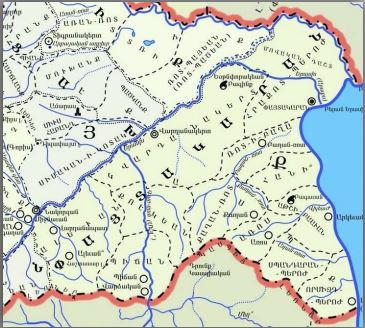
Map of Paytakaran

According to the 7th-century Armenian geography Ashkharatsʻoytsʻ, Paytakaran was the 11th of the 15 provinces of the Kingdom of Armenia. Ashkharatsʻoytsʻ provides the names of 12 cantons of Paytarakan, which at the time were in the possession of Adurbadagan:

- Hrakʻot-Perozh (centre: Paytakaran)
- Vardanakert (centre: Vardanakert)
- Ewtʻnapʻorakean Baginkʻ
- Kʻoekyan
- Baghanṛot
- Ṛot-i-Bagha (appears to be a duplication of Baghanṛot)
- Aṛos Pichan (centre: Pichan)
- Hani
- Atshi-Bagawan (centre: Bagawan)
- Spandaran-Perozh (centre: Spandaran)
- Ormizd-Perozh
- Alewan (centre: Alewan)

The precise location of Paytakaran's cantons and its namesake city are unknown. Hewsen, following Yeremyan, writes that the shrine of Ewtʻnapʻorakean Baginkʻ seems to be the same as the shrine of Gabaṛu Baginkʻ ('the temple of Gabaṛ'), which is to be identified with the "Altars of the Sabaians" (read *Gaba[r]ians) mentioned by Ptolemy (VI.2.1); Yeremyan states that the latter name is preserved in the name of a kurgan in the Mughan Plain called Kabirry (Кабирры). The district of Vardanakert surrounded the city of the same name, which in the later Arabic sources is called Warthan and which has been identified with the ruins of Altan on the southern bank of the Arax. (Note: See Hewsen 2001, map 52 and Harutyunyan 1986, p. 302 for tentative placements of the cantons of Paytakaran.) The city of Paytakaran is often identified with the Bailaqan of Arabic sources and sometimes with Beylagan in modern-day Azerbaijan, on the left bank of the Arax. However, Hewsen, concurring with Tadevos Hakobyan and Babken Harutyunyan, places the city in the Mughan Plain, at a point which may have been reached by the Caspian Sea in antiquity and where the mouth of the Arax may have been before its course changed and it merged with the Kura. Harutyunyan specifies that the ruins of the city should be sought west of the present-day city of Salyan, Azerbaijan, near the now-dried-up Mahmudchala lake. Traces of the old delta of the Aras have been preserved there.A number of medieval Armenian authors, following Tovma Artsruni's example, misidentify the city of Paytakaran with Tbilisi.

The spellings of the names vary greatly in different copies of Ashkharatsʻoytsʻ. Yeremyan reduces the number of cantons to ten by combining the duplicated Ṛot-i-Bagha/Baghanṛot (both mean "Bagha River") and removing Kʻoekyan, which appears in only two manuscripts. Several of the canton names indicate that they were sites of some religious significance. Ewtʻnapʻorakean Baginkʻ means "Altars of the Seven Niches", Spandaran means "place of sacrifices", and Atshi-Bagawan has been interpreted as "Place of the Fire God".

== History ==
The region was known to Greco-Roman authors as Caspiane, which was once home to a people called the Caspians. Caspiane was contested between the regional powers. Strabo, writing c. 20 AD, mentions Caspiane among the lands conquered by King Artaxias I of Armenia from the Medes in the 2nd century BC, but adds that this land belonged to "the country of the Albanians" in his time. Armenia had lost the territory to Caucasian Albania in about 59 BC, when Pompey rearranged the political geography of the region after defeating Tigranes the Great. Albanian control seems not to have lasted long, as Pliny the Elder (died 79 AD) indicates that the Caspians were located in Media. The region was again conquered by the Armenians at some point, most likely during the reign of Vologases I of Armenia.

Armenian control over Paytakaran most likely vacillated during the rule of the Artaxiad and Arsacid dynasties. It occupied a strategic position due to its proximity to the Caspian Gates, and nomadic peoples frequently crossed through the region to raid central Armenia and Adurbadagan. Although the documents known as the Zoranamak (Military Register) and Gahnamak (Throne-List) mention a prince of Kaspkʻ who provided a force of 3000 men to the Armenian army and occupied the tenth seat at the royal table, this is considered spurious by Cyril Toumanoff and Robert Hewsen. None of the classical historians mention any princely house of Caspiane, and the region appears to have been a royal domain under Armenian rule. The provincial centre Paytakaran was likely a royal city and served as a royal dungeon under the Arsacids; 438 pre-Christian priests are said to have been imprisoned there by the lord of Angeghtun following the Christianization of Armenia.

Paytarakan is said to have been conquered in the early 330s by the Arsacid noble Sanatruk/Sanesan, who made its chief city his temporary capital and attempted to usurp the Armenian throne. According to Hewsen, the Arsacid kings of Caucasian Albania "apparently continue to rule from [the city of] Pʻaytakaran as Persian vassals" after a Persian marzban (governor general) was appointed to oversee Albania from the capital of Kapalak. The Armenian history Buzandaran Patmutʻiwnkʻ names Paytakaran among the provinces that rebelled against King Arshak II in the 360s. This rebellion was suppressed by sparapet Mushegh Mamikonian in the late 360s during the reign of Pap. Faustus writes that Mushegh sacked the city of Paytakaran, killing many of its inhabitants and taking tribute and hostages. According to Harutyunyan, after the partition of Armenia in 387 the province remained a part of eastern Armenia until the dissolution of the Arsacid kingdom of Armenia in 428, when it was ceded to Adurbadagan. Hewsen, on the other hand, writes that the cession occurred in 387.

== Population ==
The region was non-Armenian by ethnic composition. Hewsen describes it as "probably the least Armenian" of the traditional Armenian provinces. Strabo writes that the Caspians who once inhabited the region had disappeared by his time, so the Caspians (Kaspkʻ) of Armenian sources 400 years later were likely not the same people but rather a "hodgepodge of Albanians, Cadusians, Amardians, Atropatenian Medes, and other nomadic or semi-nomadic Iranian tribes".
