= Provinces of the kingdom of Armenia (antiquity) =

Administrative units of the 321 BC – 428 AD monarchy

15 provinces of Historical Armenia

The ancient kingdom of Armenia had 15 provinces. The provinces were called ashkharh (Armenian: աշխարհ), which means "world" in Armenian.

Province (ashkharh)	Armenian name	Area (km²)	Number of cantons (gavars)	Center
Upper Armenia	Բարձր Հայք	23,860	9	Ani-Kamakh
Sophene	Ծոփք	18,890	8	Arshamashat
Aghdznik	Աղձնիք	17,532	11	Tigranakert
Turuberan	Տուրուբերան	25,008	17	Manazkert
Moxoene	Մոկք	2,962	8	Moks
Corduene	Կորճայք	14,707	11	Mahkert
Nor Shirakan	Նոր Շիրական	11,010	9	Zarehavan
Vaspurakan	Վասպուրական	40,870	35	Van
Syunik	Սյունիք	15,237	12	Baghaberd
Artsakh	Արցախ	11,528	12	Khachen
Paytakaran	Փայտակարան	21,000	10	Paytakaran
Utik	Ուտիք	11,315	8	Partaw
Gugark	Գուգարք	16,795	9	Ardahan
Tayk	Տայք	10,179	8	Boghberd
Ayrarat	Այրարատ	40,105	22	Artashat
Greater Armenia	Մեծ Հայք	280,998	189	Armavir

== See also ==
- Armenian Highland
- Armenian Kingdom of Cilicia
- Greater Armenia
- Lesser Armenia
- Hemşin
- Armenian Mesopotamia
- Kingdom of Armenia (disambiguation)

== Literature ==
Hewsen, Robert H.: Armenia: A historical Atlas. The University of Chicago Press. ISBN 0-226-33228-4.
