= 780 Armenia =

Main-belt asteroid

Discovery
- Discovered by: G. N. Neujmin
- Discovery site: Simeiz Observatory
- Discovery date: 25 January 1914

Designations
- Pronunciation: /ɑːrˈmiːiə/
- Alternative designations: 1914 UC

Orbital characteristics
- Epoch 31 July 2016 (JD 2457600.5)
- Uncertainty parameter 0
- Observation arc: 107.14 yr (39134 d)
- Aphelion: 3.4169 AU (511.16 Gm)
- Perihelion: 2.8119 AU (420.65 Gm)
- Semi-major axis: 3.1144 AU (465.91 Gm)
- Eccentricity: 0.097135
- Orbital period (sidereal): 5.50 yr (2007.5 d)
- Mean anomaly: 346.438°
- Mean motion: 0° 10^{m} 45.552^{s} / day
- Inclination: 19.085°
- Longitude of ascending node: 144.857°
- Argument of perihelion: 214.403°

Physical characteristics
- Mean diameter: 98+2 −3 km (pole solution 1); 102+3 −2 km (pole solution 2)
- Mass: (1.0±1.0)×10^{18} kg (Note: Calculated from its standard gravitational parameter GM = 0.07±0.07 km^{3}/s^{2}.) (SB441)
- Mean density: 1.9–2.1 g/cm^{3} (calculated)
- Synodic rotation period: 19.88453±0.00007 h (pole solution 1); 19.88462±0.00009 h (pole solution 2)
- Pole ecliptic longitude: 144° ± 7° or 293° ± 3°
- Pole ecliptic latitude: −44° ± 11° or −23° ± 6°
- Geometric albedo: 0.042+0.005 −0.003 (pole solution 1); 0.038±0.003 (pole solution 2)
- Absolute magnitude (H): 9.00

780 Armenia is a minor planet in the asteroid belt orbiting the Sun. It is named after the Kingdom of Armenia, now Armenia. This object is orbiting at a distance of 3.11 AU with an eccentricity of 0.097 and a period of 5.50 yr. The orbital plane is inclined at an angle of 19.1° to the plane of rotation. This asteroid spans a girth of ~94 km. The long rotation period of this asteroid necessitated light curve data from more than one latitude. The overlapping data provided a solution with a period of 19.891±0.002 h and a brightness amplitude of 0.18±0.03 in magnitude.

This object is the namesake of the Armenia family, a family of 13–76 asteroids that share similar spectral properties and orbital elements; hence they may have arisen from the same collisional event. All members have a relatively high orbital inclination.
