= Achaemenid Assyria =

Region of Near East between 539–330 BC

Athura 𐎠𐎰𐎢𐎼𐎠 Aθurā
- Province of Achaemenid Empire
- 539 BC–330 BC
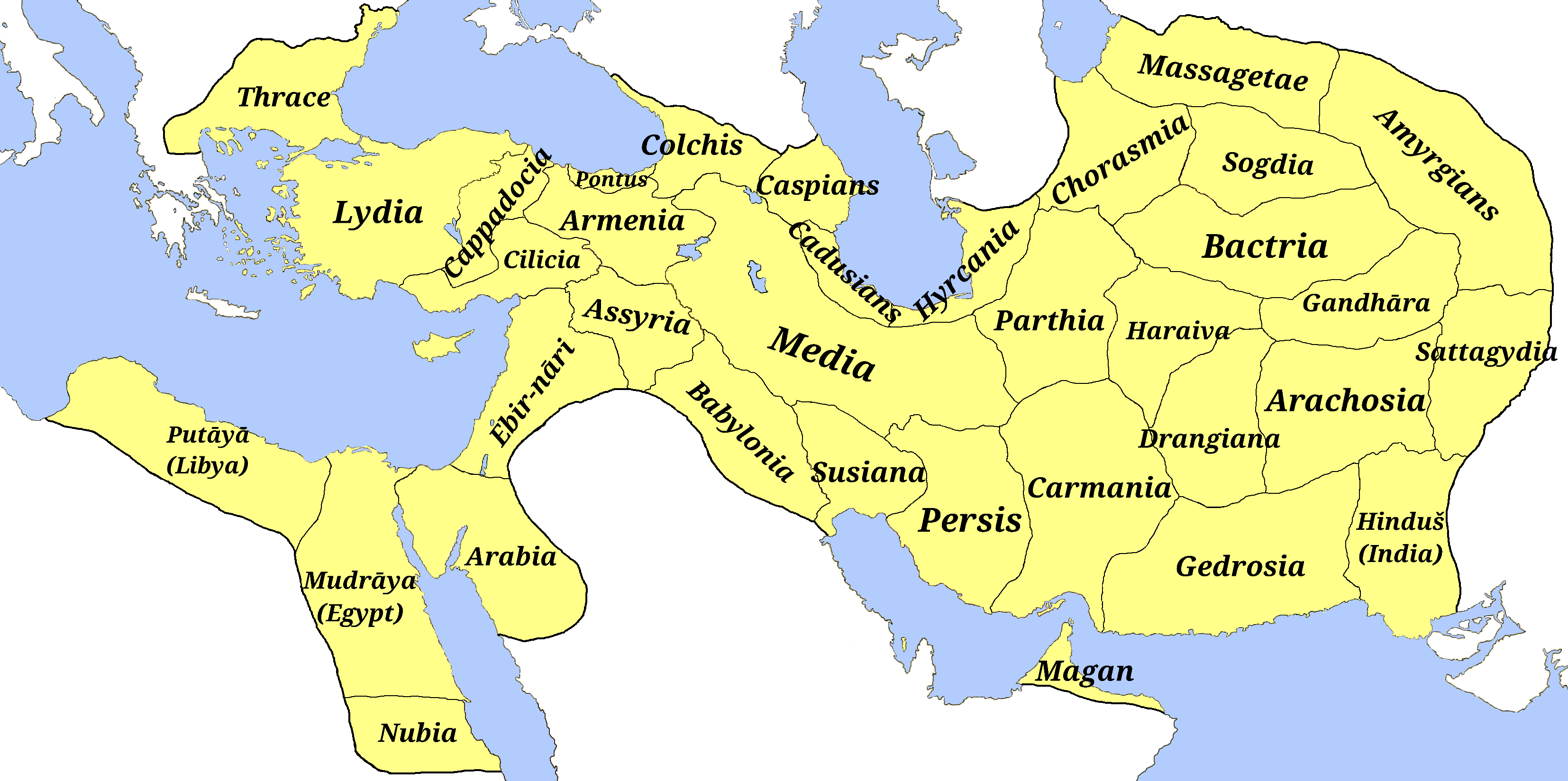
- Satrapies of the Achaemenid Empire
- History
  - Established: 539 BC
  - Disestablished: 330 BC
Preceded by	Succeeded by
Neo-Babylonian Empire	Macedonian Empire

Athura (Old Persian: 𐎠𐎰𐎢𐎼𐎠, romanized: Aθurā Persian pronunciation: [aθuɾaː]), also called Assyria, was a geographical area within the Achaemenid Empire in Upper Mesopotamia from 539 to 330 BC as a military protectorate state. Although sometimes regarded as a satrapy, Achaemenid royal inscriptions list it as a dahyu (plural dahyāva), a concept generally interpreted as meaning either a group of people or both a country and its people, without any administrative implication.

It mostly incorporated the territories of Neo-Assyrian Empire corresponding to what is now northern Iraq in the upper Tigris, the middle and upper Euphrates, parts of modern-day northwestern Iran, modern-day northeastern Syria (Eber-Nari) and part of southeast Anatolia (now Turkey). However, Egypt and the Sinai Peninsula were separate Achaemenid territories. The Neo-Assyrian Empire collapsed after a period of violent civil wars, followed by an invasion by a coalition of some of its former subject peoples, the Iranian peoples (Medes and Scythians), and Babylonians in the late seventh century BC, culminating in the Battle of Nineveh, and Assyria had fallen completely by 609 BC.

Between 609 and 559 BC, former Assyrian territories were divided between the Median Empire to the east and the Neo-Babylonian Empire to the west. Both parts were subsumed into the Achaemenid Empire in 539 BC, and it has been argued that they constituted the satrapies of Media and Aθurā, respectively. In Herodotus's account, the Ninth Tributary District comprised "Babylonia and the rest of Assyria" and excluded Eber-Nari.

Despite a few rebellions, Aθurā functioned as an important part of the Achaemenid Empire and its inhabitants were given the right to govern themselves throughout Achaemenid rule and Old Aramaic was used diplomatically by the Achaemenids.

Known for their combat skills, Assyrian soldiers (along with the Lydians) constituted the main heavy infantry of the Achaemenid military. Due to the major destruction of Assyria during the fall of its empire, some early scholars described the area as an "uninhabited wasteland." Other Assyriologists, however, such as John Curtis and Simo Parpola, have strongly disputed this claim, citing how Assyria would eventually become one of the wealthiest regions among the Achaemenid Empire. This wealth was due to the land's great prosperity for agriculture that the Achaemenids used effectively for almost 200 years.

In contrast to the policy of the Neo-Assyrian Empire, the Achaemenid Persians did not intervene in the internal affairs of their ruling satrapies as long as they continued the flow of tribute and taxes back to Persia.

== Fall of the Assyrian Empire ==
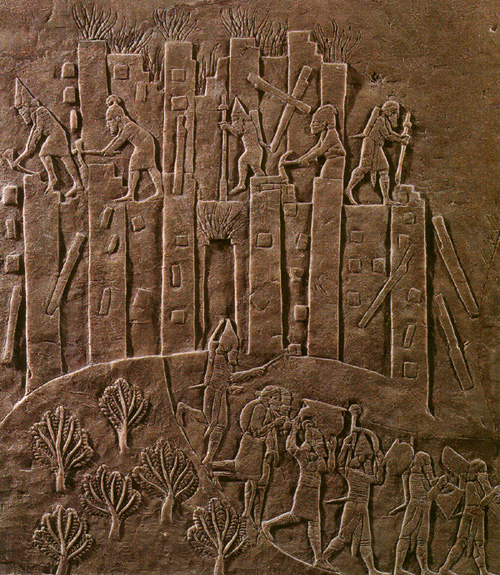
Assyrians lay waste to Hamanu, Elam, 647 BC. In less than 40 years the same fate would befall Assur, Nineveh and Harran.

Between the mid 14th centuries and late 11th century BC, and again between the late 10th and late seventh centuries BC, the respective Middle Assyrian Empire and Neo-Assyrian Empire dominated the Middle East militarily, culturally, economically and politically, and the Persians and their neighbours the Medes, Parthians, Elamites and Mannaeans were vassals of Assyria and paid tribute.

However, the Assyrian empire descended into a period of civil war in 626 BC, which drastically weakened it, and eventually led to a number of its former subject peoples, namely the Babylonians, Medes, and Scythians, forming an alliance and attacking the civil war-ridden Assyrians in 616 BC. The Battle of Nineveh in 612 BC eventually left Assyria destroyed for years to come.

The Assyrians continued to fight on with the aid of another of their former vassals, the Twenty-sixth Dynasty of Egypt, also known as the Saïte dynasty, who feared the rise of these new powers. A costly but victorious Battle at Megiddo against the forces of the Kingdom of Judah in 609 allowed Saïte Egypt to advance to the rescue, only to be defeated by the Babylonian-Median-Scythian alliance. Harran, the new Assyrian capital, was eventually taken the same year, thus ending the empire.

Despite this, part of the remnants of the former Assyrian army continued to fight on, along with Egypt, until final defeat at Carchemish in 605 BC.

The Babylonian rule was unpopular but did not last long. In 539, Cyrus the Great defeated the Babylonian king Nabonidus—ironically himself an Assyrian from Harran—took Babylon and made it, along with Assyria, into provinces of the new Achaemenid Empire.

== As part of the Achaemenid Empire ==
The former major Assyrian capitals of Nineveh, Dur-Sharrukin and Kalhu (now Nimrud) were only sparsely populated during Achaemenid rule. Most Assyrian settlement was in smaller cities, towns and villages at plain level, in the mountains, or on mounds such as Tell ed-Darim. However, according to more recent Assyriologists such as Georges Roux, cities such as Arrapḫa, Guzana (now the ruins of Tell Halaf) and Arbela (now Erbil) remained intact, and Ashur was to revive. Despite many of the Assyrian cities being left largely in ruins from the battles that led to the fall of its empire in the seventh century BC, rural Assyria was prosperous according to the Greek scholar Xenophon. After passing Kalhu and Nineveh (which he described in ruins with only a handful of Assyrians dwelling amongst them), Xenophon and the Greeks turned north-west, following the east bank of the Tigris. He described rural Assyria:

[T]here was an abundance of corn in the villages, and found a palace, with many villages round about it ... In these villages they remained for three days, not only for the sake of the wounded, but likewise because they had provisions in abundance – flour, wine, and great stores of barley that had been collected for horses, all these supplies having been gathered together by the acting satrap of the district.

The testimony is an example of the rich agricultural resources of Assyria's region and the existence of a satrap's palace. It is not known exactly where this palace was located, but Austen Henry Layard suggested it may have been near Zakho.

An inscription found in Egypt, written by Arsames, describes Assyrian cities that obtained administrative centres under Achaemenid rule:

- Lair: Assyrian Lahiru (Eski Kifri), by the Diyala Valley
- Arzuhina: Tell Chemchemal, 40 kilometers east of Kirkuk
- Arbela
- Halsu: Location unknown
- Matalubash: Assyrian Ubaše (Tell Huwaish), 20 kilometers north of ancient city of Assur

Prior to the Persian rule of Assyria, the Achaemenids were greatly Assyrianized, and Aramaic continued as the lingua franca of the Empire in the region, with the Imperial Script the everyday writing system. Traditional Mesopotamian religion within the empire was tolerated, and the judicial system, Assyrian calendar and imperial standards imposed by the Assyrians remained in force everywhere.

The Assyrians, like all other tributary peoples of the Achaemenids, were obliged to pay taxes to the Emperor and, whenever he campaigned, supply troops as well. Reliefs of Assyrian tribute bearers carved on the east and north sides of the Apadana, consist of seven bearded men: one carrying animal skins, one carrying a length of cloth, two carrying bowls, and two leading mouflons.

=== Rise of Aramaic ===
The Assyrian Empire resorted to a policy of deporting troublesome conquered peoples (predominantly Aramean tribes as well as many Jews, Elamites and others) into Mesopotamia. While this allowed some integration, it may have also led to the various rebellions within the Empire in the seventh century. By the sixth century, the indigenous and originally Akkadian-speaking peoples of Assyria and Babylonia spoke Akkadian-influenced varieties of Eastern Aramaic that still survive among the Assyrian people to this day. Consequently, during the Persian rule of Assyria, Aramaic gradually became the main language spoken by the Assyrians.

Even before the Empire fell, the Assyrians had made Aramaic language the lingua franca of its empire; many could speak it and the ruling elite of Assyria needed to be bilingual, capable of speaking both Akkadian and Aramaic. The conquest of Assyria and the violent destruction of the cities meant that many of these bilingual skilled individuals died with their language and the Aramaic script was incorporated into the Assyrian culture by around the late 6th century BC.

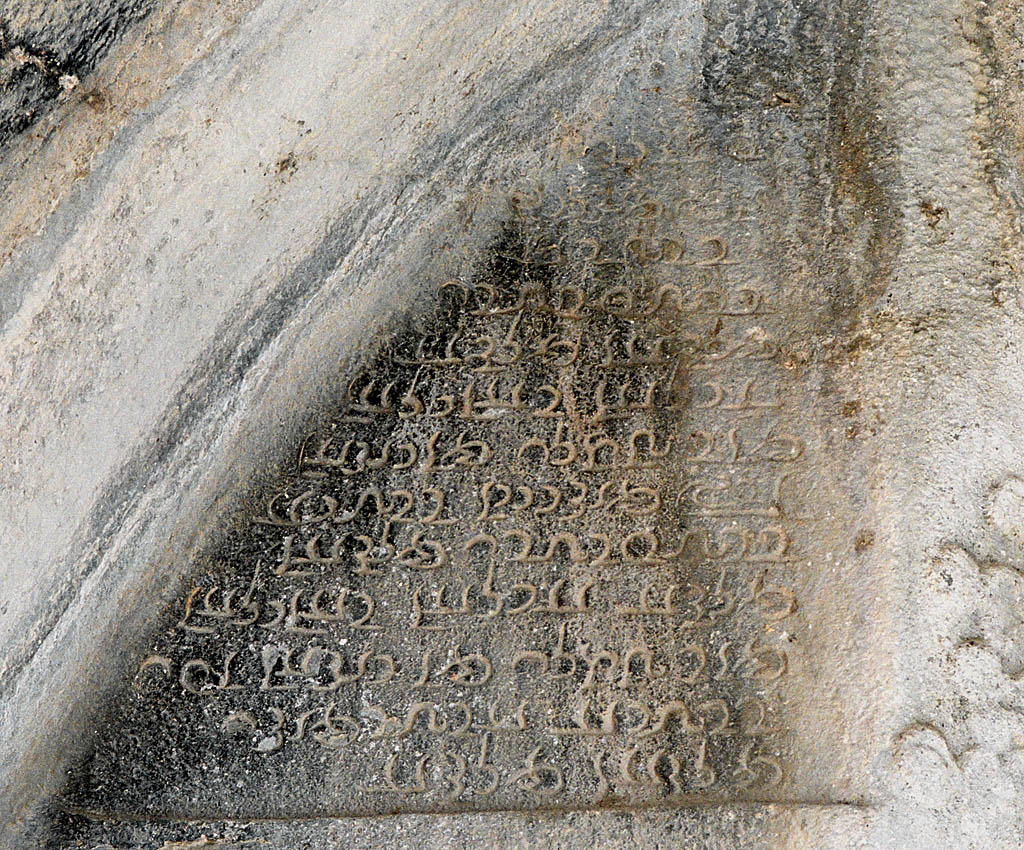
Inscriptional Pahlavi text from Shapur III at Taq-e Bostan, fourth century. Pahlavi script is derived from the Aramaic alphabet used under Achaemenid rule.

Following the Achaemenid conquest of Assyria under Darius I, Imperial Aramaic was adopted as the "vehicle for written communication between the different regions of the vast empire with its different peoples and languages." The use of a single official language is thought to have greatly contributed to the success of the Achaemenids in holding their far-flung empire together for as long as they did.

Imperial Aramaic was highly standardized; its orthography was based more on historical roots than any spoken dialect, and the inevitable influence of Persian gave the language a new clarity and robust flexibility. In 1955, Richard N. Frye questioned the classification of Imperial Aramaic as an "official language", noting that no surviving edict expressly and unambiguously accorded that status to any particular language.

Frye reclassifies Imperial Aramaic as the lingua franca of the Achaemenid territories, suggesting then that the Achaemenid-era use of Aramaic was more pervasive than generally thought.

For centuries after the fall of the Achaemenids, Imperial Aramaic–or near enough for it to be recognizable–remained an influence on the various native Iranian languages. Aramaic script and–as ideograms–Aramaic vocabulary survived as the essential characteristics of the Pahlavi scripts.

One of the largest collections of Imperial Aramaic texts is that of the Persepolis fortification tablets, which number about five hundred.

Many of the extant documents witnessing to this form of Aramaic come from Egypt, and from Elephantine in particular. Of them, the best known is the Wisdom of Ahiqar, a book of instructive aphorisms quite similar in style to the biblical Book of Proverbs. Achaemenid Aramaic is sufficiently uniform that it is often difficult to know where any particular example of the language was written. Only careful examination reveals the occasional loan word from a local language.

A group of thirty Imperial Aramaic documents from Bactria were recently discovered, and an analysis was published in November 2006. The texts, which were rendered on leather, reflect the use of Aramaic in the fourth century BC Achaemenid provinces of Bactria and Sogdia.

Aramaic dialects and written script survive to this day among the Christian Assyrians of Iraq, southeastern Turkey, northeastern Syria and northwestern Iran.

=== Assyrian revolts in 546 and 520 BC ===
In 546 and 520 BC, the two Assyrian provinces of Mada and Athura revolted against the Achaemenids. Though the revolts were suppressed, it illustrated that the two regions acted in unison, suggesting perhaps an ethnic and cultural link. Having said this a rebellion could occur in several different parts of an Empire for geographical reasons and it may have been that the whole of the Mesopotamia region became swept with rebellion.

=== Campaigns ===
Although the effectiveness of the once invincible Assyrian army was shown to be greatly depleted by the time of its eventual collapse, the soldiers of Assyria continued to be brave and fierce warriors. Most soldiers at the time would not wear heavy armour, but rather than act as melee troops, would serve as skirmishers. The Assyrian troops were different, since they fought as archers, cavalry and heavy infantry and were useful as front line troops. The Assyrian infantry was specifically trained to engage in hand-to-hand combat. A massive army was assembled by Xerxes in the early 5th century BC. Contemporary estimates place the numbers between 100,000 and over a million. Whatever the number, it was enormous and the Persians summoned troops from all across their realm. Herodotus remarks that Assyrian soldiers were employed in Xerxes's expedition to Greece.

The Assyrian contingent wore on their heads either bronze helmets or plaited helmets of a peculiarly foreign design which is hard to describe. Their shields, spears, and daggers, resembled Egyptian ones, and they also carried wooden clubs with iron studs, and wore.

— Herodotus

=== Influence of Assyrian art on Achaemenid sculpture ===
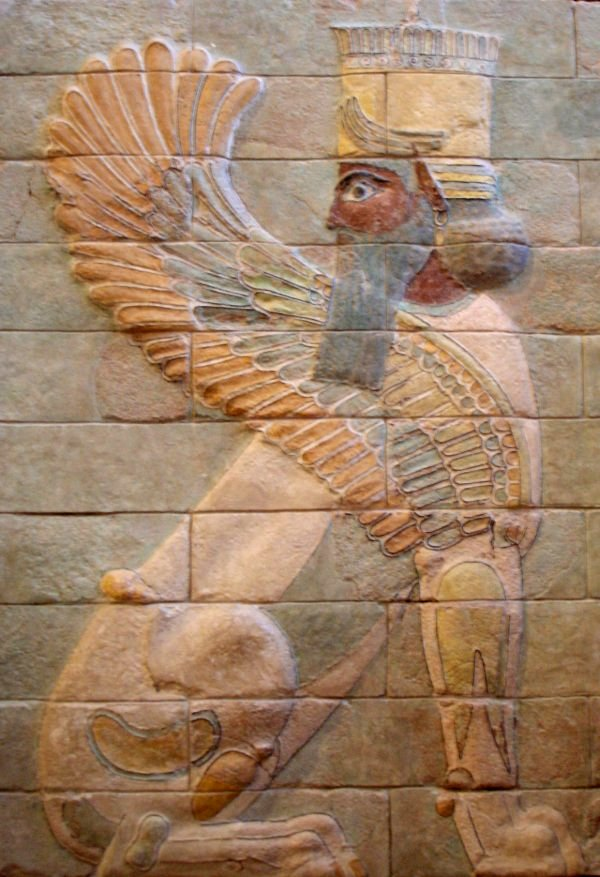
Assyrians of Athura were responsible for the glazing of the Palace of Darius at Susa and have influenced Achaemenid Persian art to some extent.

The Assyrians continued to serve the Achaemenids under Emperor Darius the Great, who was at his time considered the greatest ruler, often styling himself as "King of Kings." He ruled as a king over many other powerful subordinates and, as such, it was believed that a great palace should be built at Susa in Pars. The Assyrians were employed in the construction of this building, albeit with many other tributary peoples as well as Persians themselves. The western Assyrians of Athura were closer to Mount Lebanon, where fine trees could be found and timber processed for Darius's grand Palace. The eastern Assyrians of Mada were charged with excavating gold.

Assyrian influence over Achaemenid art and sculpture can be seen in various areas of the empire. Examples include the doorway relief of the palaces in Pasargadae, and in the Bukan area (near Urmia) where various tiles are decorated with human-headed winged figures, lions, and ibexes. The symbol of the Assyrian god Aššūr was chosen as the faravahar, the symbol of God in Zoroastrianism, during the Achaemenid rule of Assyria.

The best example of Assyrian influence can be observed in the Gate of All Nations in Persepolis, with two lamassus (human-headed winged bull) in the entrance. The Assyrian lamassu was used to protect the palace from evil spirits, while those of Persepolis expressed meditative calm and humanity. Iranologists and Assyriologists have tried to answer the question of how was the influence transmitted. Possibilities include contacts between Athura and Persia were frequent and Achaemenid architects visited the Assyrian palaces. Other suggest Assyrian slaves were brought back to Persia to have them work on the new palaces.

=== Economy ===
As with many other countries, the primary occupation was farming. The large output of Mesopotamian farms resulted in highly populated civilizations. The chief crop that fueled the ever-growing civilizations in the region was the grain barley and enumer wheat though sesame seeds also provided a source of nourishment. Like much of the rest of the world at the time, the economy of Athura relied heavily upon the produce of the farms and the rivers, including fish and what fruit and meat could be raised in the Euphrates' fertile soils. The agricultural year began with sowing after summer. Flooding posed a serious risk to farmers, whilst rodents were supposedly driven off by prayers to the rodent god. To ensure that such prayers were answered, tall silos were built to house the grain and keep out the mice.

Trees were grown for their fruit. To prevent the hot winds of the region from destroying the crops, tall palm trees were planted around the smaller trees, thus breaking the wind and shading the plants from the heat of the sun, the intensity of which provided plenty for the plants, even when shaded. Following the Persian conquest, peaches were added to the original Assyrian mix of apples, cherries, figs, pears, plums and pomegranates. Tree growing was an art mastered with tree-cutting and even "artificial mating" in order to have the Palm trees yield fruit. In the north, rainfall in Athura met the demands of farming but in the more southernly parts (covering Mada) Shadufs were used to assist in irrigation.

Oxen, donkeys, cattle and sheep were raised, the latter for their milk (which could be turned into butter) and the former as draught animals. Pigs, ducks, geese and chickens were all raised for their meat. Hunting supplemented the food supply with birds and fish.

The down-time resulting from farming and the seasons allowed men and women to master other skills in life such as the arts, philosophy and leisure. Without the fertile soils of the Euphrates river valley, civilization would not have come to be.

=== Archaeological findings ===
==== Kalhu ====
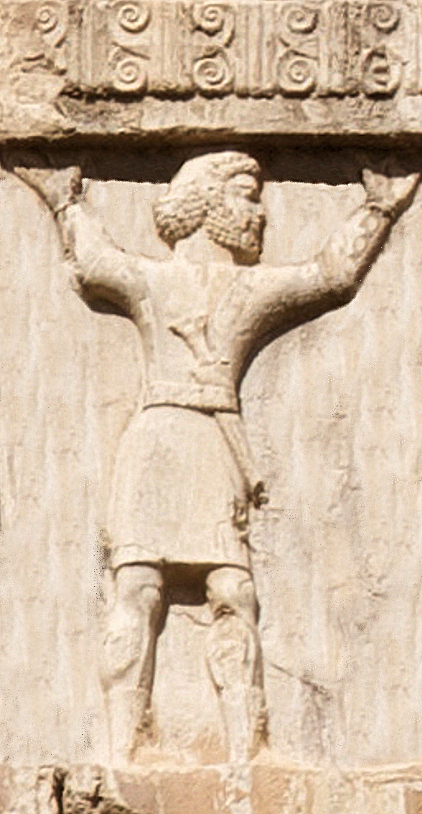
Assyrian soldier in the Achaemenid army c. 470 BC, Xerxes I tomb, Naqsh-e Rustam.

Kalhu (Nimrud)'s buildings were dramatically destroyed during the sacking of 614–612 BC. However, evidence of reoccupation during the "post-Assyrian period" (612–539 BC) is noted in various areas, including the Palace of Adad-nirari III, the North-West Palace, the Burnt Palace and Nabu Temple complex, Fort Shalmaneser, and the Town-Wall Houses.

Xenophon passed by Nimrud (which he called Larissa) in 401 BC along with 10,000 Greek soldiers and described the city as

a large deserted city ... Its wall was twenty-five feet in breadth and a hundred in height, and the whole circuit of the wall was two parasangs. It was built of clay bricks, and rested upon a stone foundation twenty feet high ... Near by this city was a pyramid of stone, a plethrum in breadth and two plethra in height; and upon this pyramid were many barbarians (Assyrians) who had fled away from the neighbouring villages.

Despite Xenephon's description of the city as being abandoned, archaeological evidence seems to show that there was some Achaemenid-period occupation. Phase 3 or H in the Nabu Temple complex and Burnt Palace is described as Achaemenid occupation. They include traces of kilns on the south side of Room 47 in the Burnt Palace, together with red glass ingots and slag, which after a radiocarbon analysis yielded a date of 425 +/− 50 BC. In the Nabu Temple, a pipe lamp and a group of seven pottery vessels are considered to be "ascribed to the Achaemenid period." There was also some Achaemenid occupation in the South-East Palace: a deep footed bowl, a hemispherical bowl (which is compared with pottery from the Achaemenid village at Susa), and three pottery vessels. Also in the South-East Palace were two "eye of Horus" amulets, often regarded as hallmarks of Achaemenid period material culture. Another eye of Horus amulet has been found in the Town Hall Houses. In the palace of Adad-nirari III, three bronze kohl sticks with castellated heads having been identified as Achaemenid period.

==== Assur ====
Like other Assyrian capitals, Assur was greatly destroyed during the battles of the century before. The importance of the city thereafter is not clear, but much evidence indicate it was a flourishing city during the Achaemenid rule. After the Babylonian conquest by Cyrus the Great, the "Cyrus Cylinder" mentions Assur as one of the cities of which cult statues were returned. In 401 BC, Xenophon describes the city as

A large and prosperous city named "Caenae" (Assur) which was seen on the opposite (west) bank of the Tigris River. From this city, the barbarians (Assyrians) brought over loaves, cheeses and wine, crossing upon rafts made of skins.

At the Assur Temple, two shrines have been identified as being built between the fifth and third centuries BC. A few graves at the site also may have been belonged to the Achaemenid period. From the grave site, a pair of circular earrings with globules has clearly been identified as Achaemenid. These earrings are similar to the silver earring found at Dur-Sharrukin near Nineveh. In another grave, Haller dates grave number 811 as Achaemenid period. The grave contained three bodies, a stamp-seal showing the goddess Ishtar standing on the back of a lion. This might indicate that ancient Mesopotamian religion was still being practiced within the Assyrian population during the Achaemenid rule. Other objects from the grave 811 include a bronze fibula; another earring, but gold rather than the earlier described silver; different kinds of beads of silver, agate, frit and glass; an alabastron; a bowl made of copper; and two pottery bottles. It is not clear, however, if all the items are Achaemenid in date.

==== Tel ed-Daim ====
To the northeast of Kirkuk, the site of Tel ed-Daim shows significant evidence of Achaemenid rule. A small fortified palace (most probably for a local governor) includes a bronze wall-plaques, a bronze snaffle-bit of a type well known from Achaemenid contexts at Persepolis, kohl tubes with ribbed decoration tapering, and pottery. The pottery in the palace show similarities with the pottery from Nimrud that has been identified as Achaemenid.

==== Eski Mosul Dam Salvage Project ====
In the Eski Mosul Dam Salvage Project, a few items were identified as dating from the Achaemenid period. The project was located to the northwest of Mosul, in the upper Tigris valley, and within the Assyrian heartland. In the Kharabeh Shattani site, various amounts of pottery have been dated Achaemenid. These include four bowls of which have similarities of Achaemenid bowls in Susa and Pasargadae. Other times include clay spindle whorls, two iron sickle blades, and a bronze plate optimistically identified as a horse's forehead plaque. A bronze finger-ring with a crouching animal engraved on the bezel was also found in the site and is considered to be widespread in the Achaemenid empire. Also in the project, a grave site excavated found bodies that included a conical kohl pot and a bronze pin with a castellated top. These objects are considered to be distinctive Achaemenid type.

== Assyria after the Achaemenid period ==
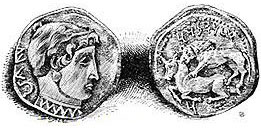
Coin of Alexander bearing an Aramaic inscription reflect the continuous impact of the Assyrian language after the Achaemenid period.

In the late fourth century BC, Alexander the Great led his Greco-Macedonian army to conquer the Achaemenid Empire. The empire's vast territory and numerous tributary peoples ensured that rebellion would be a constant problem. This new Greek Empire relied upon the administrative system put in place by the Persians to govern these new lands; consequently, the Assyrian lands of Athura and Mada were administrated as such by their own satraps. When Alexander the Great died, the Greek successor state of the Seleucid Empire, created in the Babylonian War, retained control of much of the Persian Empire. The Babylonian Chronicles now show the vitality of Greek culture in ancient cities like Babylon.

Whilst Greek rule beyond the Euphrates was subject to constant and eventually successful Iranian incursions, Assyria was forced to take the role of a frontier province, first defending the Seleucid Empire against the Parthians and later defending the Parthian Empire against the Romans. Greek rule in the East did not last long, although the cultural impact did - by the mid-third century BC, the satraps began revolting against the Seleucid Empire in Iran and Bactria, establishing their own domains. A temporary revival of Seleucid power reestablished Imperial authority in these regions in the late 3rd and early 2nd century BC, but afterward the Parthians came to incorporate the lands known as Assyria once again by the mid-second century BC.

Rule by the Parthian Empire aimed to emulate that of their Persian predecessors, the Achaemenids, with a similar system of administration involving satraps and smaller provinces. Indeed, the main rebel behind the rise of Parthia from Seleucia was a satrap himself. On top of this, the Parthian Empire was more decentralized and power was shared amongst clan leaders, hinting at the possibility of the retention of the provinces. Mesopotamia became the heartland of the Seleucid Empire with a new capital, Seleucia, founded. As a result, much culture and knowledge was exchanged between the Greeks and the Assyrians. The invasions of Alexander the Great consisted not only of soldiers but scientists and historians.

Beginning in the first century BC, the Romans began expanding their Empire at the cost of the Parthians. Initially, the nomadic military tactic of circling and shooting worked to deadly effect against the slow, heavy-moving infantry of the Romans. In time, however, superior technology and strategy drove the Parthians out of the Mediterranean and most of Anatolia. The Parthians continued to resist Roman rule, invading and in turn being invaded by the Romans many times, with their capital Ctesiphon being sacked three times. The consequence of these bloody and inconclusive wars meant that the Assyrian provinces bore the brunt of the fighting, with Assyrian troops fighting for one side and then, at the change of the governing of the lands of Mada and Athura, fighting for the other side. Naturally such events served to undermine the Assyrians.

Assyrians had begun to adopt Christianity from the first century and Aramaic remained the spoken language of the region.

By the second century AD, the Roman Empire under Trajan began to achieve the upper hand against the Parthians and established the province of Assyria along the Euphrates and Tigris.

From AD 226, Assyria became a province of the Sasanian Empire and was known as Asōristān ("Asōr-land") in Middle Persian.

In 650, the area fell to the early Muslim conquests. However, the region remained Aramaic-speaking and largely Christian well into the Middle Ages. Assyrians remain in the area to this day, and there are a number of Assyrian towns and villages in the region. In addition, cities such as Mosul, Dohuk, Erbil and Kirkuk have Assyrian populations. Most Assyrians remain Christian and retain the Aramaic language and script.

== See also ==
- Babylonia § Fall of Babylon
- Medes § Persian dominance
- Mesopotamia (Roman province)
- History of Mesopotamia
- Timeline of the Assyrian Empire

== Sources ==
- Curtis, John (2003). "The Assyrian Heartland in the Period 612-539 BC". Continuity of Empire (?): Assyria, Media, Persia. Padova: Editrice e Libreria. pp. 157–167.
- Curtis, John (2005). "The Achaemenid Period in Northern Iraq". L'Archéologie de l'Empire Achéménide: Nouvelles Recherches. Paris: De Boccard. pp. 175–195.
- Dalley, Stephanie (1993). "Nineveh after 612 BC". Altorientalische Forschungen. 20 (1): 134–147. doi:10.1524/aofo.1993.20.1.134. S2CID 163383142.
- Kuhrt, Amélie (1995). "The Assyrian Heartland in the Achaemenid Period". Pallas: Revue d'études antiques. 43: 239–254.
