= Zakaria of Panaskerti =

Historical Georgian nobleman

Zakaria Panaskerteli
- Duke of Panaskerti
- Noble family: House of Panaskerteli

Zakaria Panaskerteli (Georgian: ზაქარია ფანასკერტელი, romanized: zakaria panask'ert'eli) was a 12th-13th century Georgian nobleman and politician. Zakaria belonged to the Panaskerteli branch of the Aspanidze family and owned estates in Tao-Klarjeti. Until the 1180's he was a vassal of Guzan Abulasanisdze, ruler of Tao-Klarjeti. The turning point in Zakaria's fortune came with Guzan's rebellion against Queen Tamar, Zakaria remained loyal to the Queen and together with some other nobles, put down revolt in 1192. For this he was given Panaskerti castle to secure frontier borders in Tao-Klarjeti. The new frontier duchy comprised areas of Shavsheti, Klarjeti, Tao and Speri.
