= Velenus =

King of the Cadusii, c. 260

Velenus (Lat.: Balerus or Belenus) was the king of the Cadusii during the reign of Shapur I.

== History ==
After the Roman emperor Valerian I, due to betrayal in the battle of Edessa, was captured by the Sassanids, the king of the Cadusii Velenus, in his letter to the Sassanian shah Shapur I, wrote: “My auxiliary units sent back by you, safe and sound, I gladly accepted. But with the fact that you took Valerian, the sovereign of sovereigns prisoner, I do not congratulate you very much; I would congratulate you more if you returned him. After all, the Romans are more formidable when they are defeated . Act as befits a prudent person, and let the happiness, which has already deceived many, not inflame you. Valerian has both a son, an emperor, and a grandson, Caesar. And what to say about the whole Roman world, which is wholly rising against you? Valerian and make peace with the Romans, which will be useful to us in view of the Pontic tribes."
