= Citadel of Cadusii =

Cadusii and Amardi on the south-west shores of the Caspian Sea

Citadel of Cadusii was discovered during archaeological research in Kaluraz in the province of Gilan, Iran. It was used as a frontier fortress and protected from the invasion of people from Amardi and Marlik in the region.

== History ==
The first season of archaeological excavations at Kaluraz led to the discovery of the first architectural plan dating back to the Iron Age (1350-800 BC). The historic site has a building with large halls and several rooms. The historical hill Kaluraz, located in Rostam-Abad, is the oldest historical monument of the Gilan province. The historic site was once excavated by Iranian archaeologists in the 1960s, but since it belonged to the official authority of the previous regime, archaeological excavations ceased until recently. Finally, in 2015, drilling and stratigraphic work began in this area. “The discoveries during the first season of excavations at Kaluraz show that this hill could not have been the residence of ordinary people or even aristocrats. The two-meter citadel surrounding the hill and halls, as well as intricate rooms with brick floors, indicate that this complex was to be the seat of prominent social strata. Taking into account this evidence and the fact that this historic site was a frontier area during the era of the Cadusii tribe, it is proved that Kaluraz was a government citadel that also played a protective role,” Mohammad Reza Khalatbari, director of the prehistoric division of the center for archaeological research and head of the Kaluraz excavation, said. According to Khalatbari, the Sefidrud River has always played an important role in shaping culture and civilization in Gilan province.

"In the Middle Ages, the Sefidrud River divided the Gilan province into two parts - the Biapas and Biapish regions, the capitals of which were Lahijan and Fuman. Before that and during the first millennium BC, the river divided the Gilan province into two parts. The eastern part was captured by the Amardi tribes, and the western part - by the Cadusii tribe. The latter were located on the territory of the modern Talish region, "Khalatbari added. Khalatbari believes that Kaluraz, as well as the Pila fortress, located in the historical site of Marlik to the west and east of the Sefidrud River, were two government citadels, which were built in the border zone of this river to protect the borders of the Cadusii and Amardi. Marlik Tepe, which is considered the first cemetery of the inhabitants of the Pyla fortress, is one of the most important historical monuments of Iran, excavated by Izatolla Negahban in 1961. The bowl from Marlik is one of the most valuable Iranian historical relics found in this area. Archaeologists believe that, most likely, the tribes the Kadusis and Amard often fought among themselves, and government citadels were built in the border zone of the Sefidrud River to protect the borders between the two tribes. Most of the architectural structure of Kalurasa is built of earth and stone, which were also used in some parts, including shell rocks.

== Sources ==
- Negahban E. O. A preliminary report on Marlik excavation. Tehran, 1964
- idem. Marlik: the complete excavation report. Phil., 1996. Vol. 1–2; Dandamaev M.A., Lukonin V.G. Culture and Economy of Ancient Iran. M., 1980
- Frye R. N. The legacy of Iran. M., 2002
- Kadusi Governmental Citadel Discovered in Gilan
- Marlik
