= Onaphernes =

Onaphernes (Wanat–hvarnah, Wanafarna Holofernes) — leader of the cadusii, ally of Cyrus the Great.

== History ==
According John Clark Ridpath, at the time of the accession of Astyages cadusii were ruled by a king named Onaphernes, who, believing his country to be in danger, took wisdom into his counsel, and opened negotiations with the Median monarch relative to annexation. This odd piece of statecraft was successful; for Astyages was an easy-going king, who preferred peace to war, and was very willing to make terms with the cadusian ruler. So without bloodshed the dominions of that barbaric but politic prince were transferred to Media, himself remaining as viceroy. Stephen Dando-Collins say that Astyages sent Cyrus as a royal envoy on a special mission. Astyages had received a message from Onaphernes, ruler of the Cadusii tribe, which inhabited the Elburz Mountains on the southwest coast of the Caspian Sea. The Cadusians had been a troublesome thorn in Media’s side for years, raiding Median territory on foot then melting back into the mountains. Unbeknownst to his people, Onaphernes was proposing either a truce or an alliance with Media, and he had asked Astyages to send a trustworthy emissary for secret discussions. Astyages sent Cyrus, giving him forty days to complete his mission.

Among the Cadusii, enemies of the Medes, there was a man with aspirations to become a king named Onaphernes. The cadusii were then hostile to him. He was a traitor to his people and betraying his people, he acted in the interests of the king of the Media, who demanded a messenger from Astyages. Cyrus, appointed to carry out this task, remembered the overthrow of Sardanapalus, the last king of the Assyrians, by the Arbaces. On the way to the cadusii, Cyrus met a man beaten with a whip, who was carrying a basket of fertilizers. The man's name was Oibares, “the one who brings good news,” and he interpreted this meeting as a good omen and, in turn, persuaded Cyrus did not to go to the cadusii and instilled in him self-confidence. Since Cyrus was operose and courageous, he decided with the help of God to persuade the persians to fall away and try to remove Astyages from power, believing the Babylonian, who perfectly knows the will of the gods.

== Hypotheses ==
Ferdinand Justi identified Onaphernes with the persian commander Otanes, who was one of the seven conspirators involved in the assassination of Gaumata. According to another version, Onaphernes is the name of the title, and its real name is "Hutana-Otanes".
