= Bagavan (Caspiane) =

Bagavan (Note: Also spelled "Bagawan".) (also known as Baguan or Atshi Bagavan) was a district in Caspiane, the land of the Caspians. It was located on the right bank of the Araxes (Aras), roughly corresponding to the northeastern part of Iran's historic Azerbaijan region.

Within Bagavan, there was the historic town of Bagaran, which was also known as Atshi Bagavan. Attested as "Bagarvan" or "Bajarvan" in Arabic and Persian, this town is identified with the city of Göytəpə, Jalilabad, within the contemporary Azerbaijan Republic. (Note: In the Azerbaijan SSR the city was still a village and was known as Badcharvan/Bajarvan. It was located within the Prishib raion.) In ancient times, the Bagarvan river flowed nearby Bagaran; nowadays the river is known as Bazarchai. However Armenians and the local Iranian Talysh still refer to it as the Bagaru river.

Until the 17th century, the district of Bagavan was still referred to as "Bejirvan". The name "Atshi" probably derives from Middle Persian atash ("fire"), which, according to Robert H. Hewsen (citing Suren Yeremian), implies that the town "may once have been a center of Zoroastrian worship".

== See also ==
- Bəcirəvan, Jalilabad

== Sources ==
- Hewsen, R. H. (1988). "BAGAWAN (1)". In Yarshater, Ehsan (ed.). Encyclopædia Iranica. Vol. III/4. p. 407.
