= Pausicae =

The Pausicae (Greek: Παυσίκαι) were an ancient nomadic tribe, generally identified by modern scholars as an Iranian-speaking people of Central Asia. They are primarily known from classical Greek historiography, specifically the works of Herodotus.

== History ==
The Pausicae were part of the 11th tax district of the Achaemenid Empire, according to the Greek historian Herodotus. There is significant scholarly debate regarding whether the Pausicae are identical to the Apasiacae mentioned by later historians such as Polybius and Strabo. If they are the same group, they inhabited the eastern coast of the Aral Sea and played a role in the flight of Arsaces I during his conflict with the Seleucids.

I.M. Diakonoff suggests that the Pausikae, much like the Pantimathi and Daritae mentioned by Herodotus, were distinct tribes of the Cadusii and other Anariacae inhabiting the Caspian region. Igrar Aliyev localizes all three tribes near ancient Caspiana. The Pausicae were likely the Aspasiacae of Strabo and the Pausikae of Ptolemy, the latter placing them on the right bank of the lower Oxus.

The ethnonym Asii became widely known in Central Asia during antiquity. Describing the "Scythian" tribes of Central Asia, Strabo notes that each "has its own distinct name. All of them, for the most part, are nomads. Among these nomads, those who took Bactriana from the Greeks became particularly famous, namely the Asii, Pasiani, Tochari, and Sacarauli." Later, Strabo also mentions the Apasiacae. The Pasikae and Apasiacae are apparently the same, which, according to S. Tolstov, means "Water Sakas."

W.W. Tarn believed that the Pasiani were the Parsii and identified them with the Chorasmians. The Pausikae have also been identified with the Pashayi, a Dardic people.
