= Parachoatras (mountain) =

Parachoatras ( Arm: Patizhahar) — a mountain range that merges with the Lesser Caucasus. The Cadusians bordered on the Medes and Matians at the foot of Mount Parachoathra.

== Geography ==
V. Latyshev links the Parachoatras mountain range with the Elburz, whereas Kemal Aliyev asserts that the southern parts of Armenia are shielded by the Taurus, which separates it from the entire region between the Euphrates and Tigris known as Mesopotamia; the eastern parts border Greater Media and Atropatene; the northern parts are the Parachoatras mountains, situated above the Caspian Sea, along with Albania, Iberia, and the Caucasus, which surrounds these nations and adjoins Armenia. In the works of Movses Khorenatsi, Mount Parachoatras (now identified as the Talysh Mountains, Boerovdag, or Elburz) is mentioned as "Patizhahar," which he etymologically traces back to Old Persian and translates as "Mountain of Fleece". According to other sources, the Parachoatras refers to the lower ridges of Kebir Kuh and Posht-e Kuh.
