= Dareitai =

The Dareitai (Ancient Greek: Δαρεῖται) were an ancient Iranian tribe whose land made up a special and large part of Media. The Dareitai and Pantimati people may have been part of the Cadusii.

== History ==
According to Herodotus, the Dareitai were part of the XI satrapy, which also included the Caspians, Pantimati, Pausicae and possibly the Cadusii. During the time of the Achaemenid empire, the dareitai paid 200 talents to the royal treasury. Igor M. Diakonoff, referring to Ptolemy and Pliny, emphasized the special connection of the dareitai with Media. Ancient historians mention the dareitai in Gilan and Mazandaran. According to other sources, the dareitai were located near Caspiane.
