= Paytakaran (city) =

Paytakaran was the main city of Greater Armenia's easternmost province, Paytakaran (also known as Caspiane in Greco-Roman sources and Kaspkʻ or Kazbkʻ in Armenian sources).

Paytakaran may have been founded by the Arsacids of Armenia as a royal city. Paytakaran and its namesake province were strategically significant due to their role in protecting the kingdom against invading peoples from north of the Caucasus. The city also served as a royal dungeon. Following the Christianization of Armenia in the early 4th century, the lord of Angeghtun is said to have imprisoned 438 pagan priests in Paytaaran. After the partition of Armenia in 387, the city became a Persian important fortress. In the 6th and 7th centuries because of the Caspian Sea's levels lowering the water left the city, and soon dried one of the branches of Arax that was flowing by Paytakaran city. The city was left. In the 7th century Arab forces conquered Paytakaran city. The city was finally destroyed by Mongols.

The city's exact location is unknown. It is sometimes identified with the city of Beylagan in modern-day Azerbaijan, on the left bank of the Aras, or with the nearby village of Tazakend. The Armenian historian Ghevont Alishan placed Paytakaran near the village of Salian in Iran, where the ruins of an ancient city can be found. Other historians place it near to the confluence of the Kura and Aras rivers or closer the shore of the Caspian Sea.

== See also ==
- Paytakaran
