= Magnesia =

Magnesia may refer to:

== Chemistry and geology ==
- Magnesium oxide
  - Periclase or magnesia, a natural mineral of magnesium oxide
- Magnesian limestone (disambiguation)
- Magnesium
- Milk of magnesia, a suspension of magnesium hydroxide

== Geography ==
- Magnesia (hypothetical city), a future colony of Knossos, imagined in Plato's Laws
- Magnesia (regional unit), the southeastern area of Thessaly in central Greece
- Magnesia (constituency), electoral district
- Ancient Magnesia, a historical region of Greece with borders differing from the modern regional unit
- Magnesia ad Sipylum, a city of Lydia, now Manisa in Turkey
  - Battle of Magnesia, 190 BC, the concluding battle of the Roman–Seleucid War
- Magnesia on the Maeander, an ancient Greek city in Anatolia
- Magnesia Prefecture, a former prefecture of Greece
