= Artagerses =

Artagerses - the leader of the Cadusii, the military leader of the Persian king Artaxerxes II.

== History ==
Artagerses according to Plutarch, was the leader of the Cadusii in the fight against the usurper Cyrus. Perhaps in writing "Arta-garša" his name means "one who practices justice, order, truth". According to the testimony of ancient authors, Artagerses was one of the commanders in the army of Artaxerxes II during the battle of Cunaxa, which took place in 401 BC, when the king's younger brother Cyrus the Younger claimed the Persian throne. The leader of the cadusii, Artagerses, brought with him a detachment of horsemen from Elam. According to Xenophon, Artagerses' horsemen lined up in front of Artaxerxes himself before the battle began. As Plutarch points out, Artagerses entered into an equestrian duel with Cyrus, during which he was killed. Before the start of the single combat, Artagerses accused the king of disgracing his name when he led the "villains of the Greeks" against the Persian ruler, who had "millions of slaves better and braver" Cyrus.
