= Eber-Nari =

Satrapy of the Achaemenid Empire

Eber-Nari 𒆳𒂊𒄵𒀀𒇉 (Akkadian) 𐡏𐡁𐡓 𐡍𐡄𐡓𐡄 (Aramaic) עבר הנהר (Hebrew)
- Satrapy of the Achaemenid Empire
- c. 539 BC–c. 332 BC
- Standard of Cyrus the Great
- Historical era: Axial Age
  - Persian conquest of Babylon: c. 539 BC
  - Greek conquest of Persia: c. 332 BC
Preceded by	Succeeded by
Symbol of the Mesopotamian sun-god Shamash / Neo-Babylonian Empire	Macedonian Empire / Vergina Sun of ancient Greece

Eber-Nari (Akkadian), also called Abar-Nahara (Aramaic) or Aber Nahra (Syriac), was a region of the ancient Near East. Translated as "Beyond the River" or "Across the River" in both the Akkadian and Aramaic languages, it referred to the land on the opposite side of the Euphrates from the perspective of Mesopotamia and Persia. In this context, the region is further known to modern scholars as Transeuphratea (New Latin: Transeuphrat(a)ea; or more rarely Transeuphratena; French: Transeuphratène). Functioning as a satrapy, it was originally administered by the Neo-Assyrian Empire before being absorbed by the Neo-Babylonian Empire and then by the Achaemenid Empire. During the Greek conquest of Persia, Eber-Nari was, like the rest of the Achaemenid Empire, annexed by the Macedonian Empire of Alexander the Great. It was later dissolved by the Seleucid Empire, which incorporated it into Syria, along with Assyria.

In the "DSf" Achaemenid royal inscription, the Akkadian Eber-Nari is referred to as Athura or Athuriya in Old Persian and as Aššur in Elamite. The Targum Onkelos, an Aramaic translation of the Torah, lists Nineveh, Calah, Reheboth, and Resen as being in the Athura jurisdiction.

== Etymology ==
- Akkadian: 𒆳𒂊𒄵𒀀𒇉, romanized: Eber-Nāri [KUR.e.bir.ID₂], lit. 'trans river' — i.e. the region west of the Euphrates.
- Imperial Aramaic: 𐡏𐡁𐡓 𐡍𐡄𐡓𐡄, romanized: ʿAvar Naharā, lit. 'trans river' — i.e. the other side of the Euphrates.
- Hebrew: עבר הנהר, romanized: ʿĒḇer haNāhār, lit. 'trans river' — i.e. beyond the river.

The province is also mentioned extensively in the Biblical books of Ezra and Nehemiah as עבר הנהר ('Ever Hannahar' in modern pronunciation). Additionally, sharing the same root meaning, Eber (pronounced Evver) was also a character in the Hebrew Bible from which the term Hebrew was widely believed to have been derived (see: Eber), thus the Hebrews were inferred to have been the people who crossed into Canaan across the (Euphrates or the Jordan) river.

== History ==
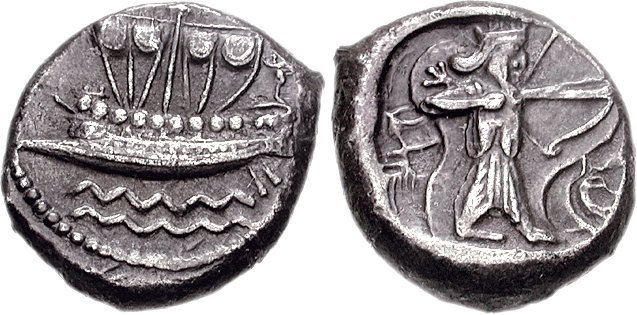
Phoenicia, Sidon. Uncertain king. Circa 435-425 BC.

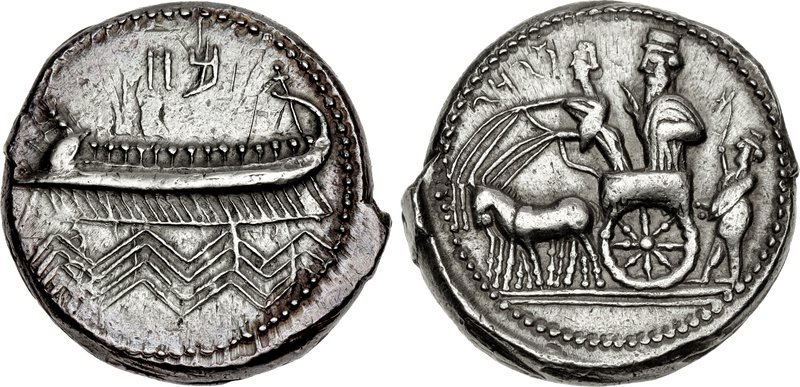
Coin of Mazaios, Satrap of Eber-Nari, Sidon, Phoenicia. Circa 353-333 BC.

=== Assyria ===
The term was established during the Neo-Assyrian Empire (911–605 BC) in reference to its Levantine colonies, and the toponym appears in an inscription of the 7th century BC Assyrian king Esarhaddon. The region remained an integral part of the Assyrian empire until its fall in 612 BC, with some northern regions remaining in the hands of the remnants of the Assyrian army and administration until at least 605 BC, and possibly as late as 599 BC.

=== Babylonia, Egypt, and Persia ===
Subsequent to this Eber-Nari was fought over by the Neo-Babylonian Empire (612–539 BC) and Egypt, the latter of which had entered the region in a belated attempt to aid its former Assyrian overlords. The Babylonians and their allies eventually defeated the Egyptians (and remnants of the Assyrian army) and assumed control of the region, which they continued to call Eber-Nari.

The Babylonians were overthrown by the Persian Achaemenid Empire (539–332 BC), and the Persians assumed control of the region. Having themselves spent centuries under Assyrian rule, the Achaemenid Persians retained the Imperial Aramaic and Imperial organisational structures of their Assyrian predecessors.

In 535 BC the Persian king Cyrus the Great organized some of the newly conquered territories of the former Neo-Babylonian Empire as a single satrapy; "Babylonia and Eber-Nari", encompassing southern Mesopotamia and the bulk of the Levant. Northern Mesopotamia, the north east of modern Syria and south east Anatolia remaining as Athura (Assyria) (Achaemenid Assyria).

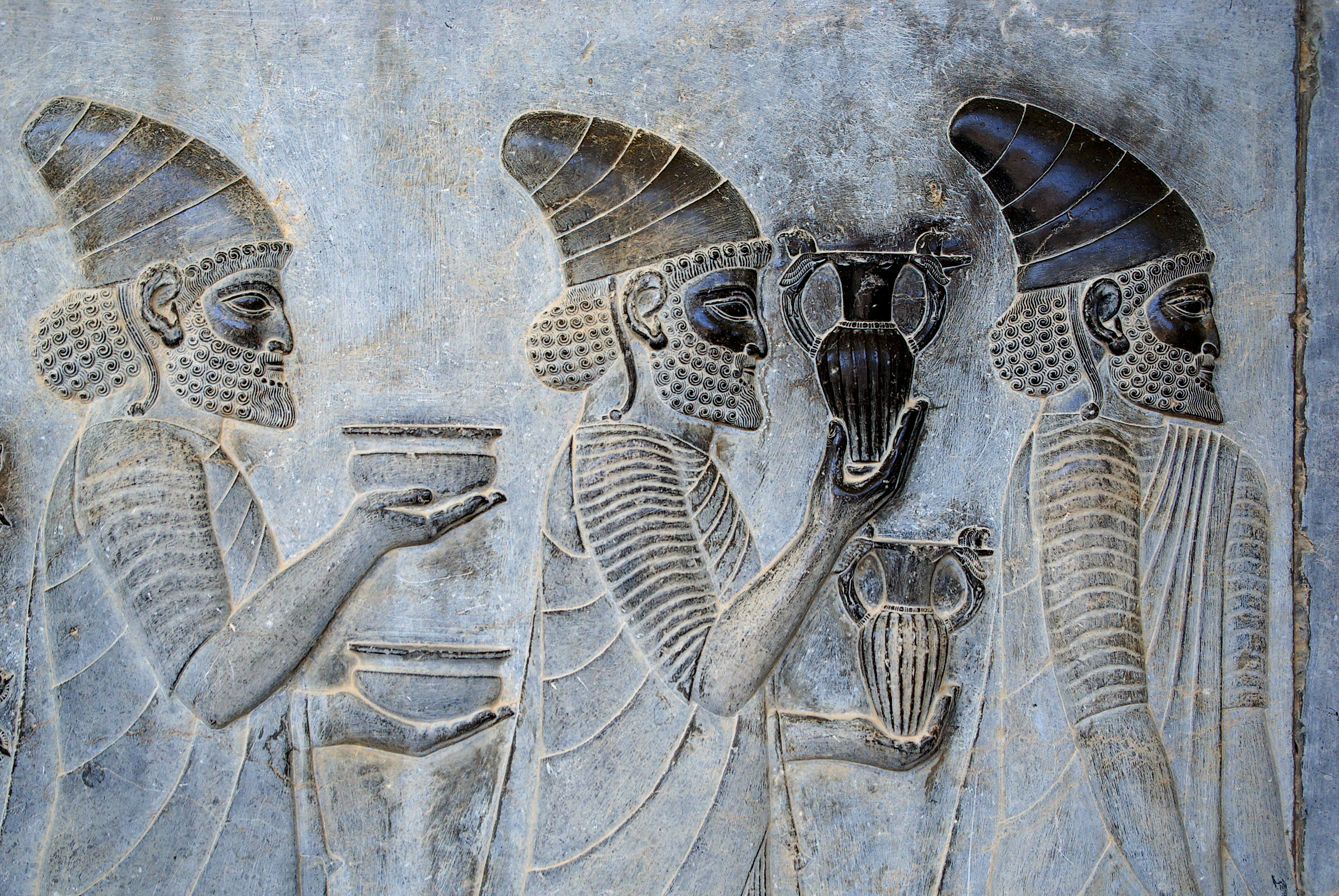
Relief of a gift-bearing delegation, possibly Syrian or Ionian, at Apadana of Persepolis

The satrap of Eber-Nari resided in Babylon and there were subgovernors in Eber-Nari, one of which was Tattenai, mentioned in both the Bible and Babylonian cuneiform documents. This organization remained untouched until at least 486 BC (Xerxes I's reign), but before c. 450 BC the "mega-satrapy" was split into two—Babylonia and Eber-Nari.

Herodotus' description of the Achaemenid tax district number V fits with Eber-Nari. It comprised Aramea, Phoenicia, and Cyprus (which was also included in the satrapy). Herodotus did not include in the tax list the Arabian tribes of the Arabian Peninsula, identified with the Qedarites, that did not pay taxes but contributed with a tax-like gift of frankincense.

=== Greece ===
Eber-Nari was dissolved during the Greek Seleucid Empire (312–150 BC), the Greeks incorporating both this region and Assyria in Upper Mesopotamia into Seleucid Syria during the 3rd century BC. Syria was originally a 9th-century Indo-Anatolian derivation of Assyria and was used for centuries only in specific reference to Assyria and the Assyrians, a land which in modern terms actually encompassed only the northern half of Iraq, north east Syria and south east Turkey and not the bulk of Greco-Roman, Byzantine or modern nation of Syria. However, from this point the terms Syrian and Syriac were used generically and often without distinction to describe both Assyria proper and Eber-Nari/Aram, and their respective Assyrian and Aramean/Phoenician populations.
