= Alarodians =

Classical-era people mentioned by Herodotus as living in present-day Turkey or Armenia

Alarodians (Ancient Greek: Ἀλαρόδιοι (Alarodioi)) were tribe living in Northern Persia or Armenia during Classical antiquity.

According to Herodotus, the Alarodians were part of the 18th Satrapy of the Achaemenid Empire and formed a special contingent in the grand army of Xerxes I. Some scholars have tried to link the Alarodians to the Urartians, suggesting that Alarodian was a variation of the name Urartian/Araratian. According to this theory, the Urartians of the 18th Satrapy were subsequently absorbed into the Armenian nation. Modern historians, however, have cast doubt on the Alarodian connection to the Urartians.

Nearly nothing is known about Alarodians except that they "were armed like the Colchians and Saspeires," according to Herodotus.

== Use of term ==
The controversial Alarodian language theory, a proposed language family that encompasses the Northeast Caucasian languages and the extinct Hurro-Urartian languages, derives its name from the Alarodians.

An earlier, separate Alarodian language group was proposed by Joseph Karst in 1928. Karst's theory suggested a connection between the Armenian and Basque languages. This theory has also failed to gain mainstream support as Armenian is not even a primary language family. (Clarification needed: Armenian is an independent primary language of the proto-indoeuropean language family.)
