= Saspeires =

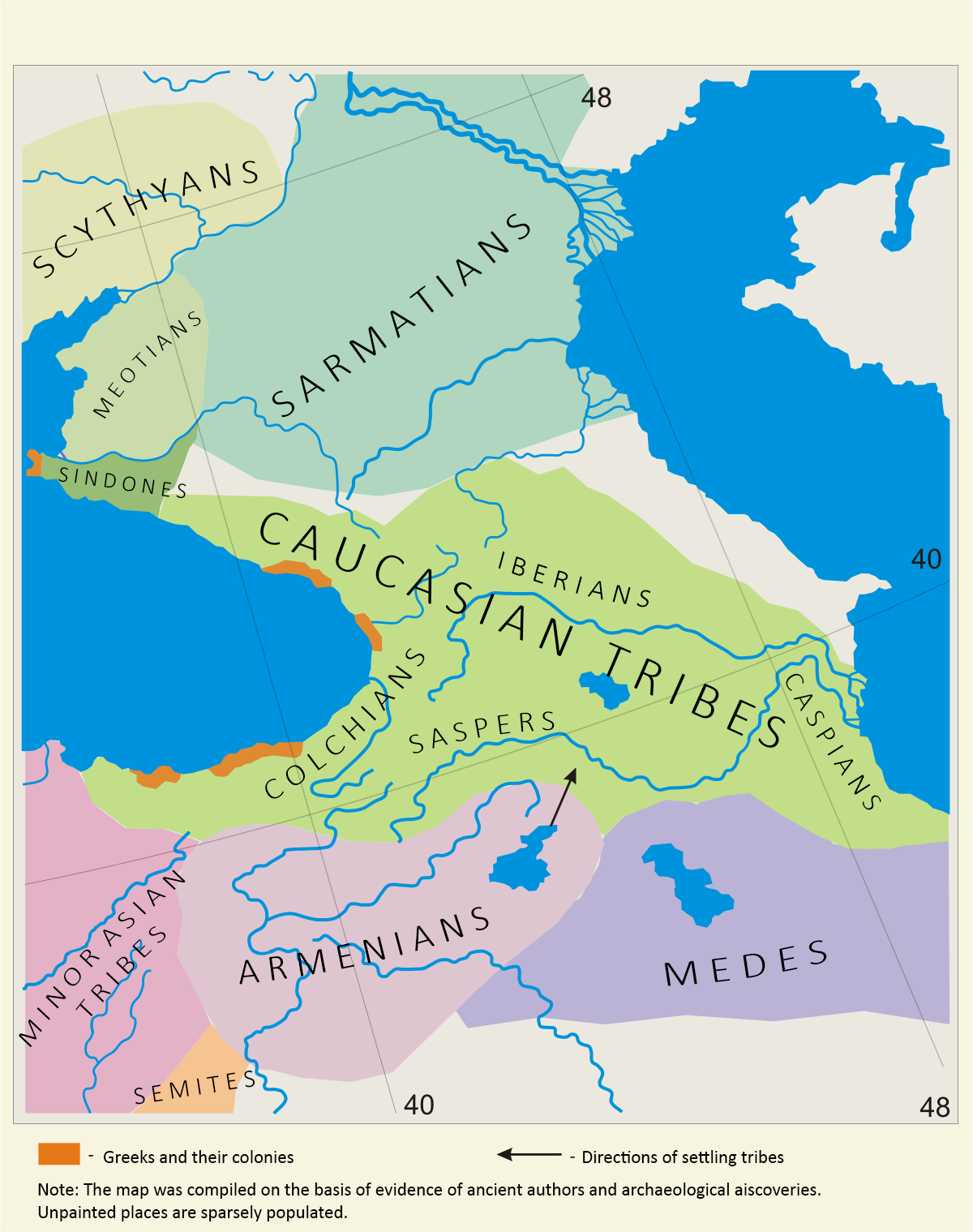
English translation of a 1956 Soviet map purportedly depicting the ethnic situation in the Caucasus during the 5th and 4th centuries BC. The Saspeires are positioned here to the immediate east of the Colchians, who straddle the eastern coast of the Black Sea

Saspeires (Ancient Greek: Σάσπειρες, Georgian: სასპერები, sasp'erebi, other names include Saspers, Saspines, Sapinians, and Sapirians) are a people of uncertain origin mentioned by Herodotus. According to the most widespread theory, they are a Kartvelian tribe. The toponym of modern-day city İspir and ancient region of Speri is thought by some to be derived from their name. According to Rayfield, Diauehi is mentioned in the Greek records as Taochoi, but Herodotus in 450 BC refers to them as Sasperi. the name Sper with a Georgian prefix of place Sa-, which evolved into the term Iberian.

The land where the Persians live extends to the southern sea which is called Red; beyond these to the north are the Medes, and beyond the Medes the Saspires, and beyond the Saspires the Colchians, whose country extends to the northern sea into which the Phasis river flows; so these four nations live between the one sea and the other.

— Herodotus

The Saspires were originally associated with the Caucasian Iberians and appear to have emerged from the Lesser Caucasus to the east. The Alarodians, Colchians, and Saspires were joined in one command, and all were dressed alike. The Colchians themselves, were not classified as belonging to any Satrapy. The Colchians, however, attended the army of Xerxes as auxiliaries. The incredible number of tribes of Mount Caucasus is spoken by ancient as modern historians. According to some authors, they constituted a significant part of the population of the early Georgian Kingdom of Iberia and played a large role in the ethnogenesis of the Georgian nation.

== See also ==
- İspir
- Speri
