= Georges Roux =

French Assyriologist (1914–1999)

Georges Raymond Nicolas Albert Roux (French: [ʁu]; November 16, 1914 – August 12, 1999) was a French writer, author of the popular history books about the Ancient Near East, Ancient Iraq and La Mésopotamie.

Son of a French Army officer, Roux moved with his family to the Middle East at the age of nine where he subsequently lived for 12 years in Syria and Lebanon before returning to France in 1935. Roux was educated by Jesuits in Beirut and studied medicine at the University of Paris, where he graduated in medicine in 1941 and later studied Oriental studies at École pratique des hautes études.

In 1950 Roux became a medical officer for the Iraq Petroleum Company (IPC), spending his first two years in Qatar and the remainder in Iraq. During his time with the IPC the company produced the magazines Iraq Petroleum and The Crescent, and Roux was commissioned to produce articles. Through the duration of 1956-1960, Roux published a series of articles, The Story of Ancient Iraq. They form the basis of his later books.

After the 14 July Revolution of Iraq in 1958, Roux returned to Europe and headed the International medical department at GlaxoWellcome, retiring in 1980. In 1964, he published in English Ancient Iraq, a book covering the political, cultural, and socioeconomic history of Mesopotamia. In 1985 he published a fuller French work, La Mésopotamie, but the English book's third edition, of 1992, has further enhancements.

== Notable works ==
- Ancient Iraq (1964), ISBN 014012523X; 1972, ISBN 0140208283; 1992, ISBN 978-0140125238
- La Mésopotamie (1997), ISBN 9782020236362
