= Balasagan =

Ancient region in modern Azerbaijan

Map of the eastern part of Transcaucasia under the Sasanian Empire

Balāsagān (an Iranian toponym meaning "country of Balas"; Armenian: Bałasakan, the inhabitants known as Bałasičkʻ, Arabic: Balāsajān/Balāšajān), also known as Bazgan, was a region located in the area of the Kura and Aras rivers, adjacent to the Caspian Sea. To the south, it bordered Atropatene/Adurbadagan and Gilan. It roughly corresponded to the Armenian province of Paytakaran, albeit extending farther into the north. It has been suggested that under the Sasanians the region extended as far as the stronghold of Derbent, albeit this remains disputed. The heartland of Balasagan was the Dasht i-Bałasakan ("Balasagan plain") which corresponds to the Mughan plain. During the late Sasanian era, Balasagan was included in the northern quadrant (kust) of Adurbadagan.

== History ==
=== Pre-Islamic period ===
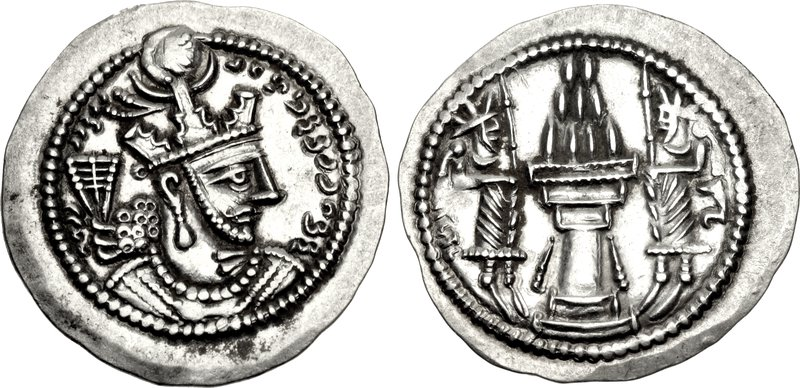
Coin of Yazdegerd II

The region is first attested as a Sasanian province in the SKZ inscription of Shapur I (r. 240–270) separately from Caucasian Albania, which indicates that it was its own political entity even if it was virtually subject to Albania. In the inscription, Shapur I's considers Balasagan and the rest of the Caucasus as part of Iran, and only regards the Roman territories of Anatolia and Syria as part of Aneran. The powerful 3rd-century Zoroastrian high priest Kartir, however, considers Balasagan and the rest of the Caucasus as belonging to Aneran. What was precisely seen as Aneran is not certain. According to the medieval Persian geographer Ibn Khordadbeh (d. 912), the ruler of Balasagan was among the leaders who was acknowledged with the title of king by the first Sasanian monarch Ardashir I (r. 224–242), which suggests that Balasagan was a direct vassal of Iran. According to the modern historian Robert H. Hewsen, the Sasanians took Balasagan from their Albanian vassals in the 5th-century (or possibly as early as 387). Administration-wise, Balasagan was part of Adurbadagan. Nothing is known about the Kingdom of Balasagan; its main hub may have been at the fortress of Khursan. The Sasanians formed districts such as Spandaran-Peroz, Hormizd-Peroz, At'sibagawan, and (probably) Alewan in order to consolidate the area under a more centralized administration.

In c. 335/6, Sanesan, the king of Maskut, occupied a portion of Balasagan, while at least acknowledging the suzerainty of the Sasanians. During the reign of Yazdegerd II (r. 438–457), the king of Balasagan, Heran, took part in the Sasanian efforts to crush the 450–451 Armenian rebellion of Vardan Mamikonian. However, he himself revolted later on, massacring a Sasanian army in Albania, and raiding Iberian, Armenian and Albanian lands. He was killed under the orders of Yazdegerd II.

=== Islamic period ===
Map of the Caucasus c. 740

Balasagan was conquered in c. 645 by an Arab army led by Salman ibn Rabi'a, who forced some Kurds of the region to pay jizya (poll tax). Furthermore, one of the accords of the peace treaty concluded between the Arab commander Hudhayfah ibn al-Yaman and the marzban (margrave) of Adurbadagan was that the Arabs were to protect the locals against the Kurds of Balasagan and the Sabalan mountains. The name of Balasagan rarely appears in classical Arabic chronicles, being replaced with Mughan. Balasagan notably appears in the work of the 10th-century Arab traveller Abu Dulaf al-Yanbu'i, who in his al-Risala al-thania, reports of his journey in the region.

== Religion ==
During the reign of Khosrow II (r. 590–628), the catholicos of Iberia and Albania, Gregory, attempted to convert the people of Balasagan to Christianity. Regardless, pockets of local paganism still remained in the country, notably in Mughan. In c. 800 bishop Eliya, who was sent as a missionary to the area, reports of inhabitants worshipping a god named Yazd, who lived in an oak tree called "king of the forest"; the bushes that encircled the tree were called "children of Yazd." The locals alleged that they had inherited the worship of Yazd from their ancestors. In Middle Persian, the term yazd simply means god, which demonstrates influence from Zoroastrianism, which must have taken place in the Sasanian era.

== Sources ==
- Brunner, Christopher (1983). "Geographical and Administrative divisions: Settlements and Economy". In Yarshater, Ehsan (ed.). The Cambridge History of Iran: The Seleucid, Parthian and Sasanian Periods. Vol. 3(2). Cambridge: Cambridge University Press. pp. 747–778. ISBN 0-521-24693-8.
- Chaumont, M. L.; Bosworth, C. E. (1988). "Balāsagān". Encyclopædia Iranica, online edition, Vol. III, Fasc. 6. New York. pp. 580–582.
- Daryaee, Touraj (2014). Sasanian Persia: The Rise and Fall of an Empire. I.B.Tauris. pp. 1–240. ISBN 978-0857716668.
- Ghodrat-Dizaji, Mehrdad (2007). "Administrative Geography of the Early Sasanian Period: The Case of Ādurbādagān". Iran: Journal of the British Institute of Persian Studies. 45 (1): 87–93. doi:10.1080/05786967.2007.11864720. S2CID 133088896.
- Ghodrat-Dizaji, Mehrdad (2010). "Ādurbādagān during the Late Sasanian Period: A Study in Administrative Geography". Iran: Journal of the British Institute of Persian Studies. 48 (1): 69–80. doi:10.1080/05786967.2010.11864774. S2CID 163839498.
- Hewsen, Robert H. (2001). Armenia: A Historical Atlas. University of Chicago Press. ISBN 978-0226332284.
- Jam, Pedram (2017). "Hrakʿotperož and Spandaranperož: Armenian Gawaṙs and Sasanian Šahrs". Iran & the Caucasus. 21 (1): 46–54. doi:10.1163/1573384X-90000005. JSTOR 44631102. (registration required)
- Shayegan, M. Rahim (2004). "Hormozd I". Encyclopaedia Iranica, Vol. XII, Fasc. 5. pp. 462–464.
- Thomson, Robert W. (1982). History of Vardan and the Armenian War. Cambridge: Harvard University Press. pp. 1–353. ISBN 9780674403352.
