= Biah Pish =

Region in Gilan Province of Iran

Biah Pish is a region in Gilan Province of Iran. It is located on the eastern shore of the Sepidrood River. Lahijan was the capital of this region.

Before the Safavid dynasty this region was under control of the central government of Iran.

During the Safavid dynasty, because of Kia'is help to Ismail I, the region gained more autonomy and Khan Ahmad Khan was the most famous governor of Biah Pish. Later because of this autonomy, Shah Ismail feared and captured Khan Ahmad Khan, who was imprisoned during 1567–1677. After Shah Ismail's death, his successor freed Khan Ahmad. He married the daughter of Tahmasp I.

In 1591, Khan Ahmad tried to get help from the Russian Empire to overcome the Safavids, but the central government recognized this and finally Abbas I of Persia conquered Gilan.

== See also ==
- Astaneh-ye Ashrafiyeh
- Kia'i dynasty
