= Salian, Iran =

Village in Kurdistan, Iran

Salian ساليان
- Village
- Location within Iran
- Coordinates: 35°14′44″N 46°38′16″E
- Country: Iran
- Province: Kurdistan
- County: Sanandaj
- Bakhsh: Kalatrazan
- Rural District: Zhavarud-e Gharbi

Population (2006)
  - Total: 343
- Time zone: UTC+3:30 (IRST)
  - Summer (DST): UTC+4:30 (IRDT)

Salian (Persian: ساليان, also Romanized as Sālīān, Sāleyān, and Sāliyān) is a village in Zhavarud-e Gharbi Rural District, Kalatrazan District, Sanandaj County, Kurdistan Province, Iran.

At the 2006 census, its population was 343, in 82 families. The village is populated by Kurds.
