= Magnesian limestone =

Magnesian limestone can refer to:

- Dolomite (rock), rock made of magnesium carbonate
- Magnesian Limestone, the traditional name of a specific suite of Permian age rocks in north-east England
