= Anariacae =

Anariacae (Ancient Greek: Ἀναριάκαι) is an ancient Caucasian people mentioned by Polybius, Strabo, and Pliny. Ptolemy erroneously called them Amariacae (Ἀμαριάκαι). According to Strabo their city was named Anariake (Ἀναριάκη; also rendered in English as Anariaca, Anariace, or Anariacae), and it had an oracle that revealed the will of the gods to those who slept within the temple.

The Armenian geographer Anania Shirakatsi mentions Anariacae (‘Anariaki’ in Armenian) among the people inhabiting the northern parts of Media.
