= Kingdom of Armenia =

Kingdom of Armenia may refer to:

- Kingdom of Armenia (antiquity), also known as Artaxiad or Arsacid Armenia, 380 BC to AD 387/428
- Bagratid Armenia, also known as the Kingdom of Armenia, AD 885 to 1045

== Other ancient Armenian kingdoms ==
- Satrapy of Armenia, also known as Orontid Armenia
- Kingdom of Sophene
- Kingdom of Commagene
- Greater Armenia
- Lesser Armenia
- Armenian Kingdom of Cilicia, also known as Cilician Armenia, AD 1198 to 1375
- Kingdom of Vaspurakan
- Kingdom of Artsakh
- Zakarid Armenia

== See also ==
- History of Armenia
