= Cadusii =

Ancient Iranian tribe

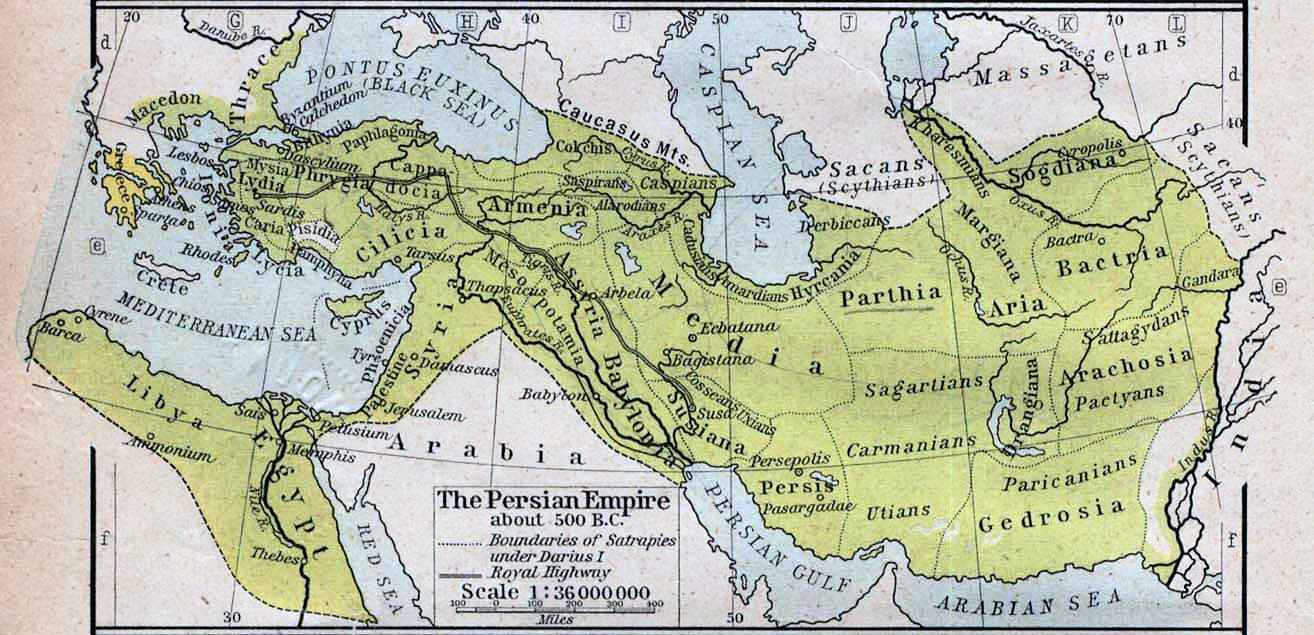
Map depicting the Achaemenid Empire in c. 500 BC, by William Robert Shepherd (1923). The Cadusii are shown in the northern part of the empire.

The Cadusii (also called Cadusians; Ancient Greek: Καδούσιοι, Kadoúsioi; Latin: Cadusii, Arabic:Qādūsīān) were an ancient Iranian tribe that lived in the mountains between Media and the shore of the Caspian Sea, an area bordering that of the Anariacae and Albani. The Dareitai and Pantimati people may have been part of the Cadusii.

According to tradition, the legendary Assyrian king Ninus subdued the Cadusii. The Greek physician and historian Ctesias (fl. 5th-century BC) was highly interested in the Cadusii, incorporating them in his invented history of an early Median dynasty. (Note: According to Ctesias' story, the Cadusii managed to maintain their independence during the Median period and are even credited with defeating them when they were ruled by king Artaeus. This conflict took place through the efforts of a Persian named Parsondas, who was the brother-in-law of the Cadusii leader and had previously fled from the Medes.) The Cadusii later voluntarily submitted to Cyrus the Great (r. 550 – 530 BC), the first ruler of the Achaemenid Empire (550–330 BC). According to Xenophon, as Cyrus was about to pass away, he appointed his younger son Tanaoxares (Bardiya) as satrap over the Medes, Armenians, and Cadusii.

The Cadusii were most likely part of the satrapy of Media, and perhaps occasionally that of Hyrcania. Although they fought on side of the Achaemenids under a certain Artagerses at the Battle of Cunaxa in 401 BC, the Cadusii appear to have had ongoing conflicts with the Achaemenid central administration. They led numerous revolts, including one that began around 405 BC, near the end of Darius II's rule (r. 423 – 404 BC), and lasted until the rebellion of Cyrus the Younger. Around 380 BC, king Artaxerxes II (r. 405/4 – 359/8 BC) led an expedition against the Cadusii, which in the words of German Iranologist Rüdiger Schmitt "was a complete fiasco". The Achaemenid forces only managed to retreat through the diplomatic efforts by the satrap Tiribazus. Artaxerxes II himself was forced to march on foot.

In the 350s BC, during the reign of Artaxerxes III (r. 358–338 BC), another Achaemenid expedition was made against the Cadusii. During a battle, Artashata (later known as Darius III) distinguished himself by slaying a warrior in single combat. His exploit was noticed by Artaxerxes III, who sent him gifts and gave him the satrapy of Armenia. Some historians report that the Cadusian contingent fought together with Medes and other Northerners in the Achaemenid forces at the Battle of Gaugamela against the Macedonians. Other historians, however, describe a different ethnic composition of the army.

According to the Iranologist Richard N. Frye, the Cadusii may be the ancestors of the Talysh people. Local Talysh experts commonly claim that the Talyshis are descended from the Cadusii. According to Garnik Asatrian and Habib Borjian, "this is one of the rare cases when a folk self-identification with an ancient people can be, at least tentatively, substantiated with historical and linguistic backgrounds."

== See also ==
- Citadel of Cadusii

== Sources ==
- Asatrian, Garnik; Borjian, Habib (2005). "Talish and the Talishis (The State of Research)". Iran and the Caucasus. 9 (1). Brill: 43–72. doi:10.1163/1573384054068169.
- Badian, Ernst (2000). "Darius III". Harvard Studies in Classical Philology. 100: 241–267. doi:10.2307/3185218. JSTOR 3185218. (registration required)
- von Bredow, Iris (2006). "Cadusii". In Salazar, Christine F.; Landfester, Manfred; Gentry, Francis G. (eds.). Brill’s New Pauly. Brill Online.
- EIr. (1994). "Darius v. Darius III". Encyclopædia Iranica, online edition, Vol. VI, Fasc. 1. New York. pp. 51–54.
- Frye, R. N. (1984). The History of Ancient Iran. C. H. Beck. ISBN 9783406093975.
- Piller, Christian Konrad (2013). "The Cadusii in Archaeology? Remarks on the Achaemenid Period (Iron Age IV) in Gilan and Talesh". Iran and the Caucasus. 17 (2). Brill: 115–151. doi:10.1163/1573384X-20130202. JSTOR 23597592.
- Schmitt, Rüdiger (1990). "Cadusii". In Yarshater, Ehsan (ed.). Encyclopædia Iranica. Vol. IV/6: Burial II–Calendars II. London and New York: Routledge & Kegan Paul. p. 612. ISBN 978-0-71009-129-1.
- Syme, Ronald (1988). "The Cadusii in History and in Fiction". The Journal of Hellenic Studies. 108: 137–150. doi:10.2307/632636. JSTOR 632636. S2CID 162335311. (registration required)
