= Caspiane =

Historic region in West Asia

Caspiane or Kaspiane (Greek: Κασπιανή, Armenian: Կասպք Kaspkʿ) was the land populated by the tribe of Caspians, after whom it received its name. Originally a province of the Median kingdom in the 3rd–2nd centuries BC, the land of the Caspians was conquered in the 2nd century BC, then passed to Caucasian Albania under the suzerainty of the Sasanian Empire in the 5th century, and later became an independent state. In the 2nd century AD, it became known as Paytakaran, and after 387 AD became a part of the Caucasian Albanian larger region of Balasakan. It roughly corresponded to the modern Mughan plain and Qaradagh regions.

== Return to Zion ==
Some biblical scholars had suggested that Kasiphia from the Book of Ezra is Caspiane, due to phonetic resemblance. Ezra, who saw there were not many Levites for recreating the Hebrew worship, asked Iddo, who led the Israelites (it is not specified whether they were from the Northern Kingdom of Israel or the Kingdom of Judah) and Canaanite servants who were exiled alongside them, for reinforcement. Iddo sent him 38 Levites and 220 Canaanite Servants (who were descendants of those King David enslaved) to join the Jews who were returning to Zion.
