= Caspians =

Inhabitants of Caspiane

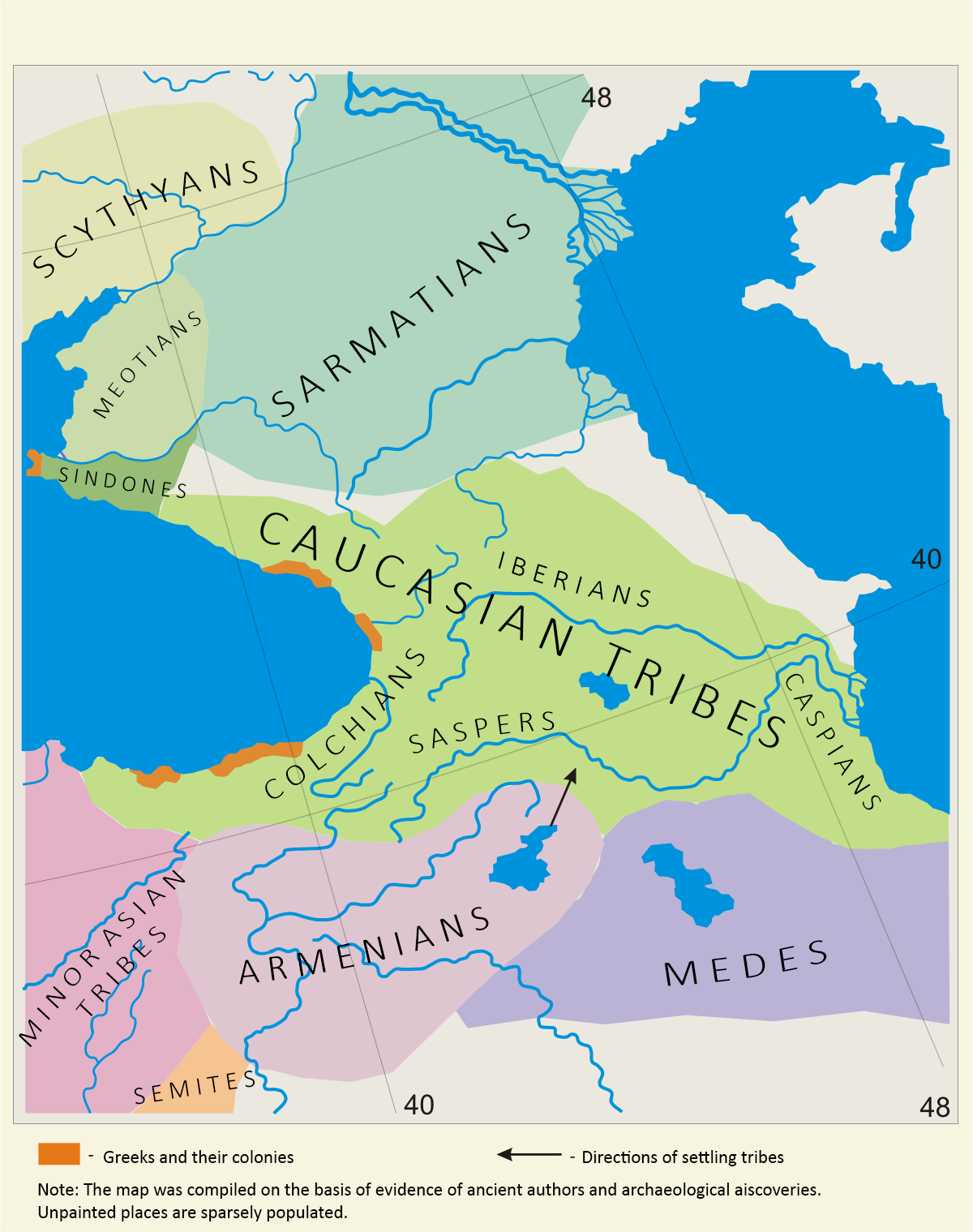
Ethnic map of the Caucasus in the 5th and 4th centuries BC.

The Caspians (Persian: کاسپی‌ها, Kâspi-hâ or کاسپیان, Kâspiyân; (Note: Singular: کاسپی, Kâspi.) Greek: Κάσπιοι, Káspioi; Aramaic: ܟܣܦܝ, kspy; Old Armenian: Կասպք, Kaspk’; Latin: Caspi, Caspiani) were a people of antiquity who dwelt along the southwestern shores of the Caspian Sea, in the region known as Caspiane. Caspian is the English version of the Greek ethnonym Kaspioi, mentioned twice by Herodotus among the Achaemenid satrapies of Darius the Great and applied by Strabo. The name is not attested in Old Iranian. According to Vasily Struve, the 'Caspians' was the name given to those Saka-Massagetae tribes that were located along the sea coast. Some sources suggest that the Caspians were the original masters of metal.

The Caspians have generally been regarded as a pre-Indo-European people. They have been identified by Ernst Herzfeld with the Kassites, who spoke a language not identified with any other known language group and whose origins have long been the subject of debate. Onomastic evidence bearing on this point has been discovered in Aramaic papyri from Egypt published by P. Grelot, in which several of the Caspian names that are mentioned—and identified under the gentilic כספי kaspai—are, in part, etymologically Iranian. The Caspians of the Egyptian papyri are therefore generally considered as either an Iranian people or strongly under Iranian cultural influence.

In the 5th century BC, during the Persian rule in Egypt, a regiment (Aramaic degel) of Caspians was stationed in Elephantine, as attested in the Elephantine papyri. They are called kspy in Aramaic and shared their regiment with Khwarezmians, Bactrians and other Iranian peoples. They were not the only garrison on Elephantine. There was also a regiment of Jews.

The Caspians are called Caspiani in Mela's De situ orbis, Caspi in Pliny's Natural History, and Caspiadae in Valerius Flaccus' Argonautica. In the last work, the Caspians are allies of King Perses of Colchis and appear amongst the Scythian peoples. They are said to have fighting dogs that they take to their graves. This might reflect a variant of the Zoroastrian custom of sky burial, one in which the deceased is left for the dogs to devour.

The Caspiadeans reappear in the medieval Historia de via Hierosolymitana among the people arrayed against the forces of the First Crusade (1096–1099). The anonymous poet, drawing on Flaccus, probably sought to connect the Seljuk Turks, the Crusaders' actual enemy, with the ancient Scythians.
