= Aparank Monastery =

Former armenian monastery in Turkey

Aparank
- Ապարանք
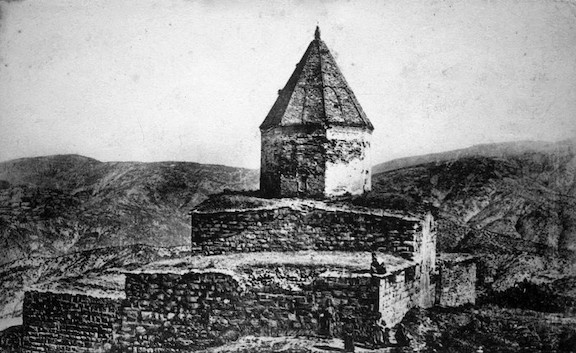

Religion
- Affiliation: Armenian
- Province: Moxoene
- Region: Van
- Ecclesiastical or organizational status: Abandoned, historically suffragan to the Catholicosate of Aghtamar

Location
- Municipality: Bahçesaray
- Country: Turkey
- Interactive map of Aparank
- Coordinates: 37°58′00″N 42°45′00″E

Architecture
- Style: Armenian
- Founder: 10th century
- Completed: 17th century

Aparank Monastery or Aparanq (Armenian: Ապարանք), or Holy Cross Aparank, is an Armenian monastery located in modern-day Turkey, Van province near the city of Bahçesaray. It was found within the borders of the historical Armenian province of Mokk.

The monastery was founded in the 10th century to house a relic of the True Cross. The church was restored and expanded in the 17th century, and it was abandoned during the first half of the 20th century after the Armenian genocide. Before the genocide, it consisted of the churches of Surb Hovhannes Karapet (St. John the Baptist), Surb Astvatsatsin (Holy Mother of God), and the chapels of Surb Stepannos (St. Stephen) and Surb Arakelots (Holy Apostles), a gavit, a fountain, and a hotel.

== Location ==
The monastery is located on the Aparank Armenian plateau and is 2,400 metres (7,900 ft) above sea level on the southwest side of Vankin Dağ (Sarikhats). It lies northwest of the town of Aparank (Veras in Kurdish) and 20 kilometres (12 mi) south of Bahçesaray in Van province, Turkey.

Historically, the complex was located in the township of Mamrtank/Mirja in Mokk' province.

== History ==
The founding of the monastery is known because of panegyric written for the occasion by Gregory of Narek, the History of the Holy Cross Aparank.

This monastery is an important part of the delivery of a relic of the True Cross by the Byzantine emperors Basil II and Constantine VIII, inbound to sign with the kingdom of Vaspurakan, in which the province of Mokk is integrated since the reign of Gagik I of Vaspurakan. The relic was initially held at the Surb Hovhannes Karapet Church, founded in 950 by a Father Davit, whose sanctity is to origin of the supply of emperors according to Gregory of Narek. It was then brought to the Surb Astvatsatsin Church, erected by his successor, the abbot and bishop Stepannos, and which was solemnly consecrated in 983, in the presence of Ashot-Sahak of Vaspurakan and his brothers Gurgen-Khachik of Vaspurakan and Senekerim-Hovhannes.

An important cultural center by the 15th century, the monastery was renovated in 1629, and expanded in following years by Abbot Simeon.

It was abandoned in the early 19th century and turned into farm by Kurds in the second half. The staurotheke gold disappeared.

== Buildings ==
Founded in 950, Surb Hovhannes Karapet ("St. John the Baptist") is the oldest church of the monastery and is located 150 metres (490 ft) northwest of the other buildings; this is a small triconch inscribed in a rectangle, without corner piece, built in shale outside but brick inside. It is covered with a barrel vault to transverse arch. A mono-nave perhaps earlier he is assistant south.

Consecrated in 983, the Surb Astvatsatsin ("Holy Mother of God") Church is a publicly listed partitioned cross surmounted by a drum, octagonal in shape, but with a cylindrical, conical cap interior; the walls of the church, stone, are decorated with brick strips. The building is pierced by three gates, respectively the Surb Stepannos, the gavit and the Surb Arakelots, the second being embraced and adorned with stalactites. The interior of the church was decorated with hagiographic paintings, of which only the coating remains.

Two contemporary mono-naves chapels, the Surb Stepannos and Surb Arakelots (Holy Apostles), are respectively contiguous to its southern façade and its northern façade. Backed by its western façade, gavit is erected in 17th century on another of 10th century and is of the four central pillars.

Finally, a fountain was built in 1650 to the north of these buildings; it is an open cube in the west by an arc decorated with two snakes and coverage supported by two arcs diagonally.

== Sources ==
- Dédéyan, Gérard (2007) [1982]. Histoire du peuple arménien. Toulouse. ISBN 978-2708968745.
- Donabédian, Patrick; Thierry, Jean-Michel (1987). Les arts arméniens. Paris: Mazenod. ISBN 2850880175.
- Guréghian, Jean V. (2008). Les monuments de la région Mouch - Sassoun - Van en Arménie historique. Alfortville: Sigest. ISBN 978-2917329061.
- Mahé, Annie; Mahé, Jean-Pierre (2000). Grégoire de Narek – Tragédie : Matean ołbergutʻean : le livre de lamentation [Gregory of Narek – Tragedy: Matean ołbergut'ean: the book of lamentation]. Leuven / Louvaine: Peeters. ISBN 978-9042908956.
- Thierry, Jean-Michel (1989). Armenian Monuments of Vaspurakan. Bibliothèque archéologique et historique. Vol. 129. Paris: Paul Geuthner. ISBN 978-2705305567.
- Thierry, Nicole (1996). "From the comparative development of murals in the Armenian kingdoms". In Garsoïan, Nina (ed.). Proceedings of the conference organized in Paris by the History Research Centre and Byzantine civilization. Armenia and Byzantium history and culture. Paris: Publications de la Sorbonne. ISBN 978-2859443009.
