= Aghperig Monastery =

Armenian monastery complex in Turkey

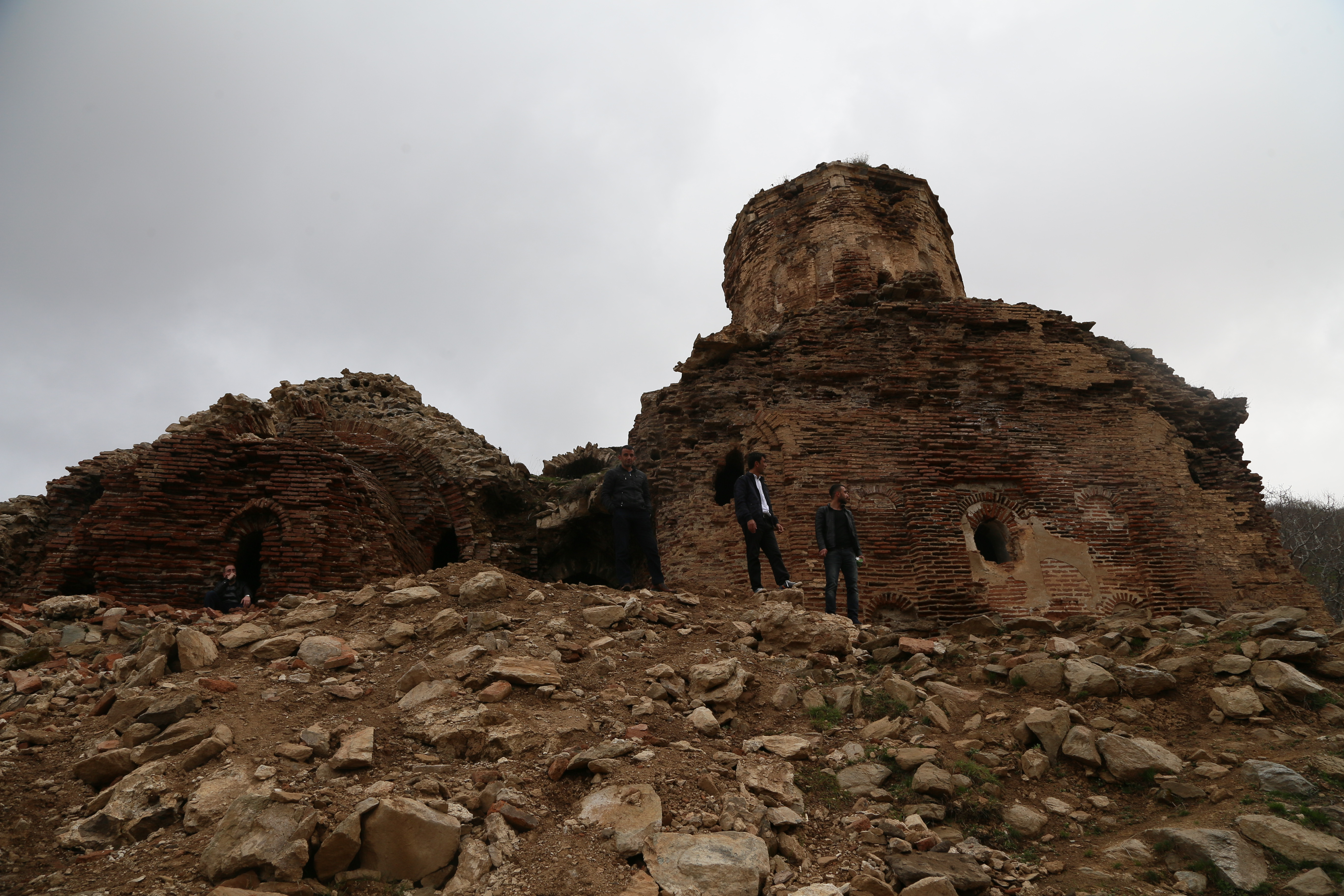
- View of the approach to the monastery

- Location within Turkey

Religion
- Affiliation: Armenian Apostolic Church
- Rite: Armenian
- Status: In ruins

Location
- Location: Turkey
- Coordinates: 38.578456°N 41.598077°E,

Architecture
- Type: Monastery
- Style: Armenian
- Founder: St. Thaddeus, Gregory the Illuminator
- Groundbreaking: c300 (original building; traditional date)
- Completed: c300 (original building; traditional date)

St. Aghperig monastery (variously Աղբերկայ Aghperga or Ս. Աղբերիկ Վանք Aghprig Monastery), also known as Beyaz Kilise, is a medieval Armenian monastic complex in the Sasun Mountains of eastern Turkey, in the historic Sasun region. Built around the year 300 AD, it was used until the Armenian genocide after 1915 and then fell into ruins. It is located 56 kilometres West of Lake Van in the north of the Sassun mountains in the Sason district in the province of Bitlis. The monastery was built above a natural spring from where it gets its name Sourp Aghperig (Holy Spring).

== History ==
According to the 1902 Eprigian (or Eprikian) encyclopaedia, its origins are in early Armenian Christianity, from around the 4th century.

"According to tradition the main church of this monastery was built by the Apostle St. Thaddeus. The adjacent second church was built by Gregory the Illuminator [cir. 300]. There is a spring beneath the church which appears a short distance away from the monastery, hence the name of the monastery, Sourp Aghprig [Holy Spring]. We saw this spring as we approached the monastery."

During the Hamidian massacres of 1895, the monastery took in refugees and wounded people. The American physician John G. Wishard recorded the testimony of an Armenian woman in his book ‘Twenty Years in Persia’:

"A woman by the name of Rahan, formerly of Dalorig, now staying at Havodoric, said, 'Our family numbered twelve, of whom five were killed. My husband, brother, and his son were hacked in pieces, my husband received a terrible wound and is now at St. Aghperig monastery."’

The monastic community left the site around the time of the 1915 Armenian genocide and the buildings have since been unoccupied and slowly becoming ruins. Many local people believed that Armenians were wealthy and hid gold beneath the ground when they left. For this reason, there are many pits dug around the site.

The Gomidas Institute paid a visit to the monastery in 2015 with academics and journalists. The London-based academic institute has been working with local Kurdish civil society and the municipality of Mutki to campaign for the protection of the monastery, which is on land owned by the state.

The 2016 documentary film 100 Years Later, about the work of Gomidas Institute founder and historian Ara Sarafian, records this trip to the monastery.

== Gallery ==
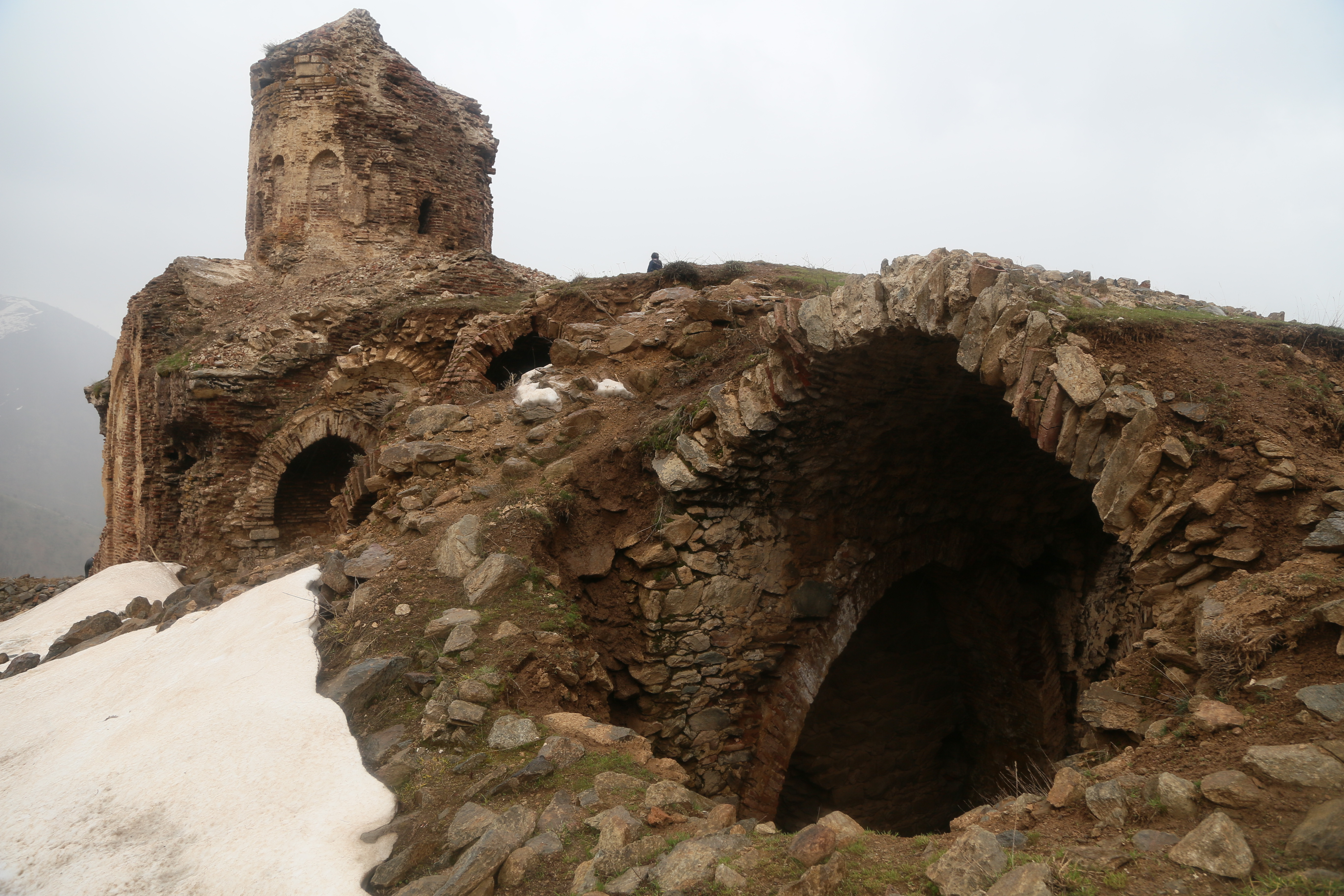

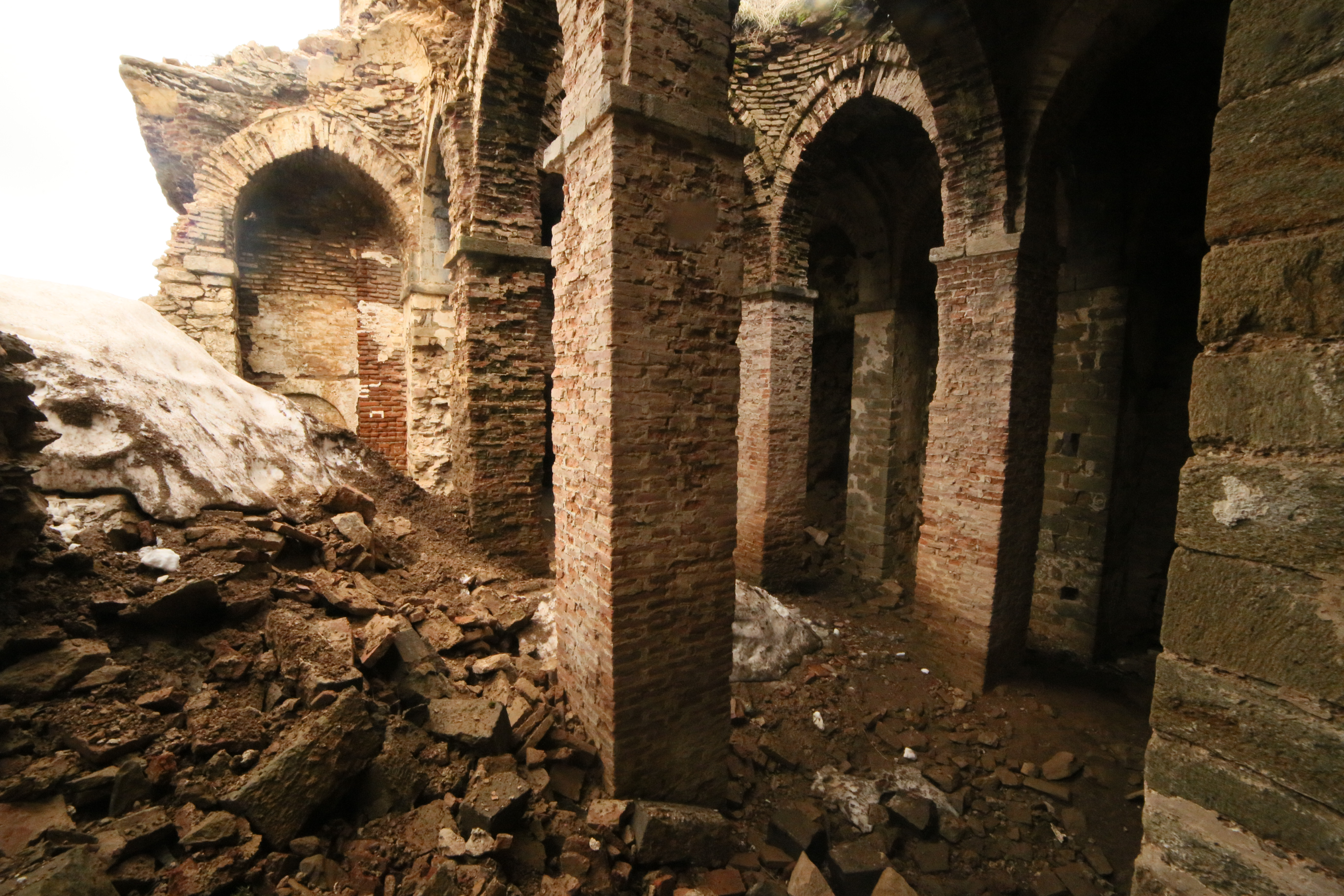

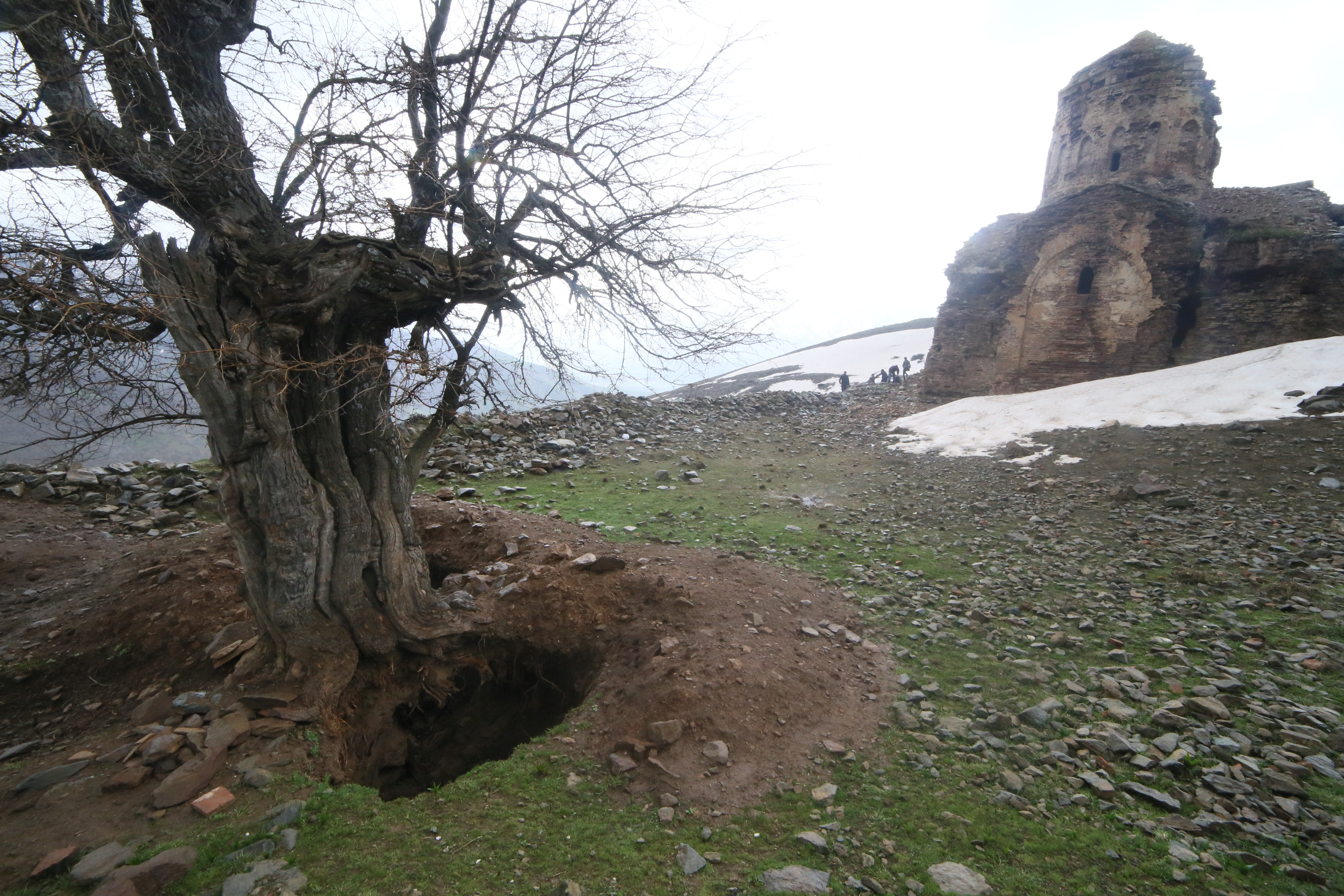

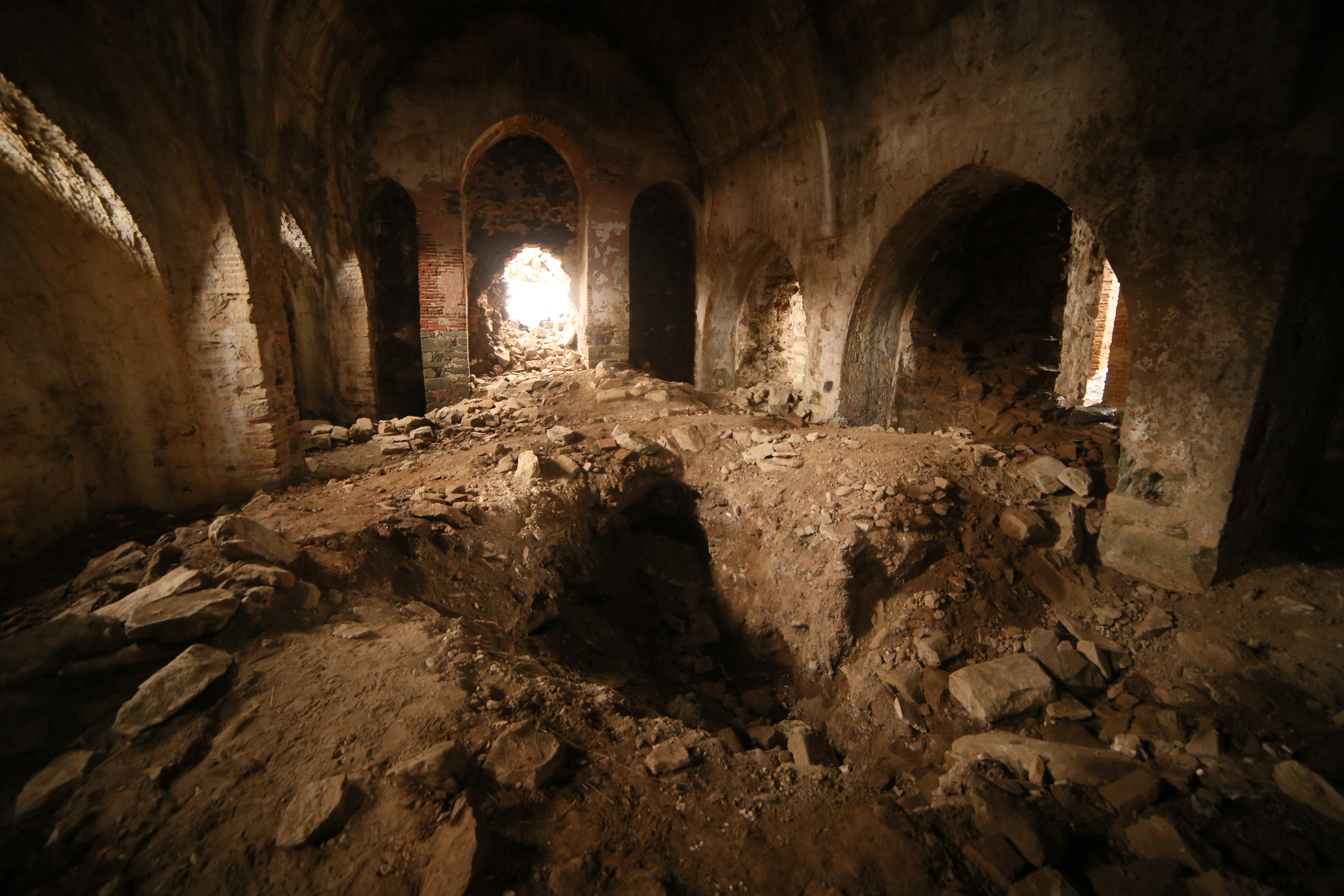

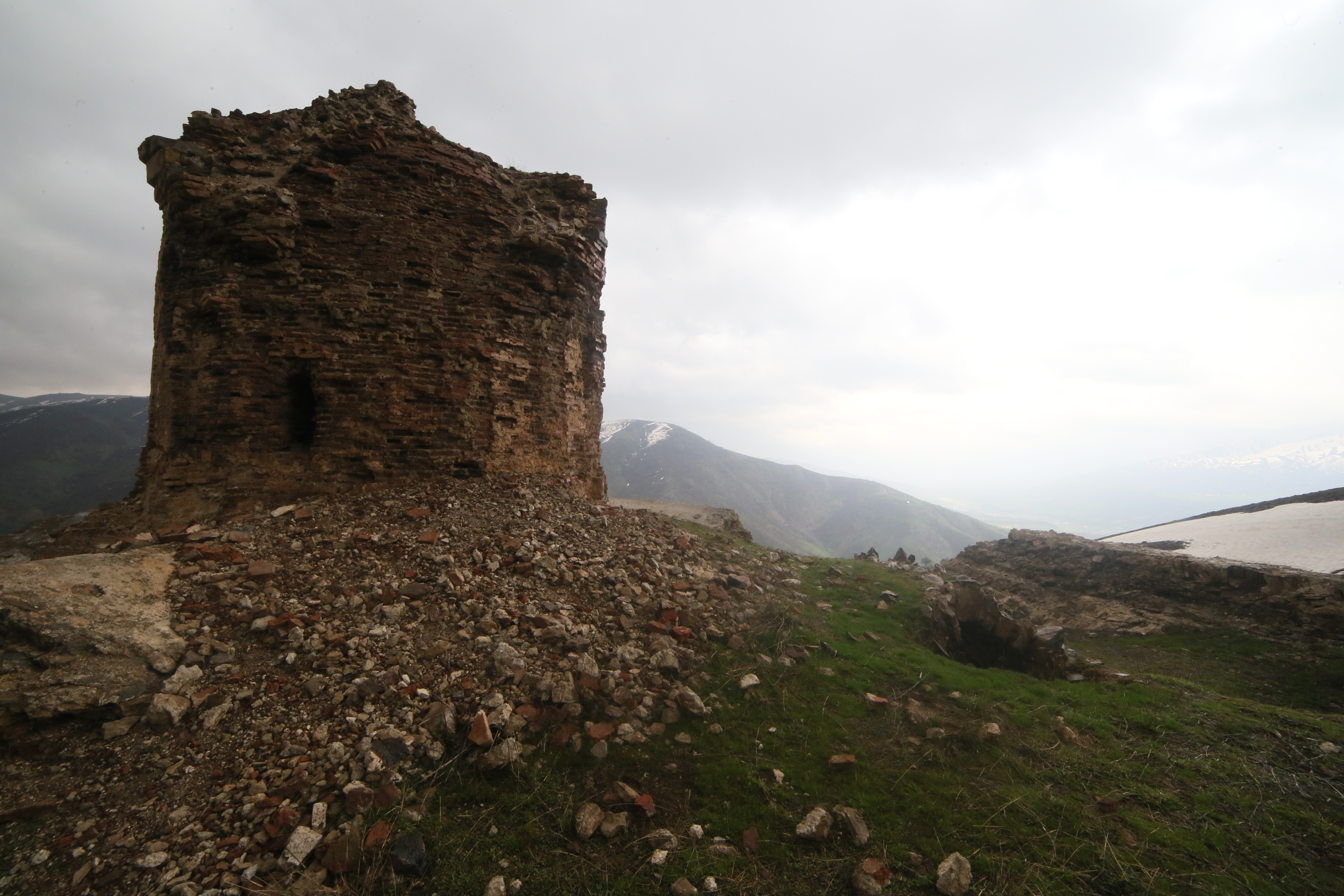
