= Irind =

Irind Իրինդ
- Location within Armenia Location within Aragatsotn
- Coordinates: 40°23′N 43°59′E
- Country: Armenia
- Province: Aragatsotn
- Municipality: Talin

Population (2011)
  - Total: 712
- Time zone: UTC+4
  - Summer (DST): UTC+5

Irind (Armenian: Իրինդ) is a village in the Talin Municipality of the Aragatsotn Province of Armenia located about 30 km east of the Turkish border. Irind was founded in 1921 by survivors of the Armenian genocide who had fled from Mush and Sasun. The town contains a 7th-century octagonal church that in 2011 was being reconstructed.

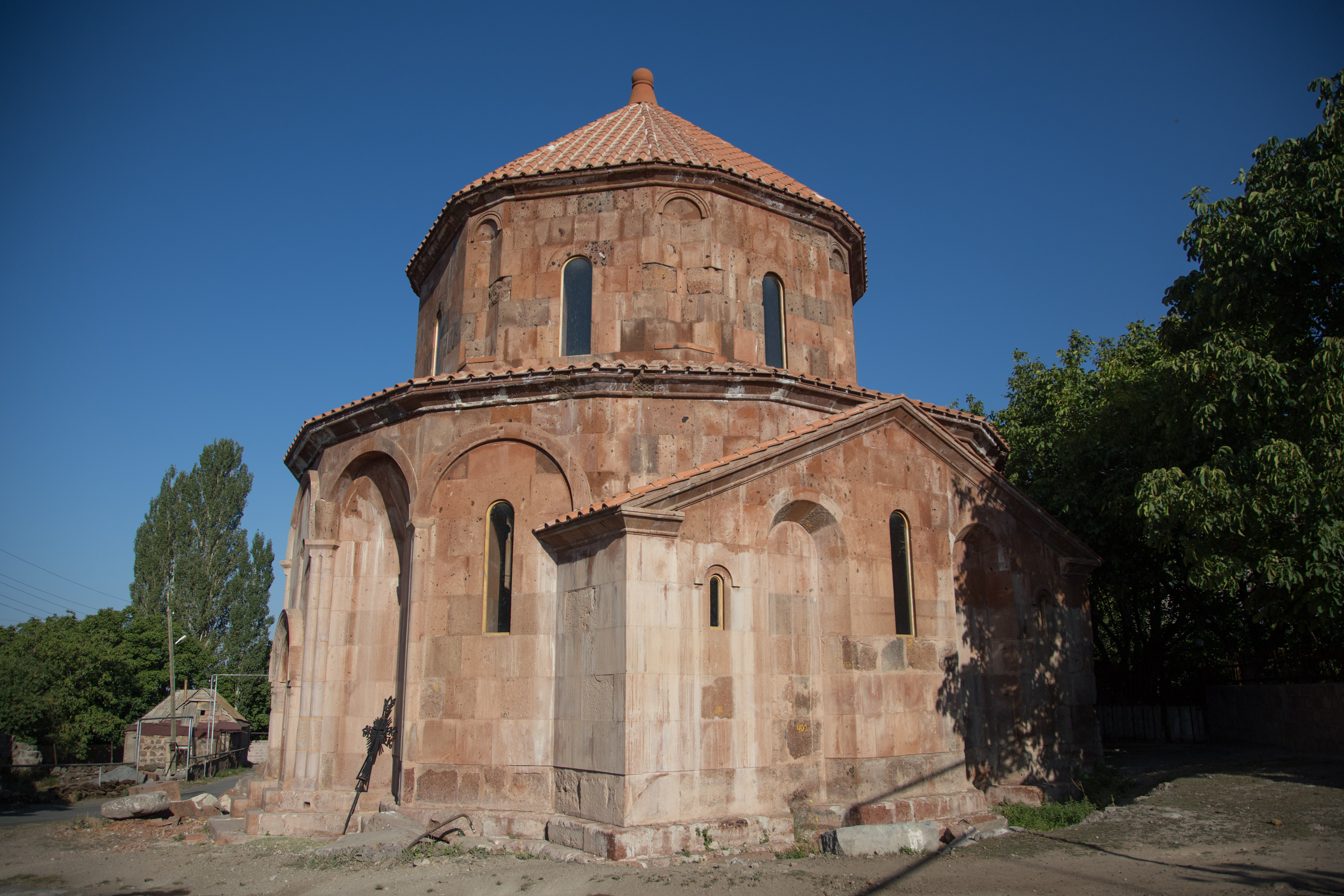
Church of Surb Gevorg in Irind, (6th century)

== Notable residents of Irind ==
- Avetis Isahakyan – Armenian poet, writer, and academic lived in Irind for 5 years
- Khachik Dashtents – Armenian writer, poet, and translator
- Prime Minister of Armenia Andranik Margaryan's family
