= Khachik Dashtents =

Soviet writer and translator (1910–1974)

- Born: May 25, 1910; Dashtadem, Bitlis vilayet, Ottoman Empire
- Died: March 9, 1974 (aged 63); Yerevan, Armenian SSR, Soviet Union
- Education: Yerevan State University; Moscow State Linguistic University
- Occupations: Writer; poet; translator
- Writing career
- Notable awards: State Prize of the Armenian SSR (1988)

Khachik Dashtents (Armenian: Խաչիկ Դաշտենց; May 25, 1910 – March 9, 1974) was a Soviet Armenian writer, poet and translator.

Dashtents was born in the Ottoman Empire and was orphaned during the Armenian genocide. He grew up in American orphanages in Alexandropol (modern-day Gyumri, Armenia) and later graduated from Yerevan State University and the Moscow State Linguistic University, where he studied English. He began his literary career in the 1930s as a poet. Over the course of his career, he translated many works from English into Armenian, including numerous plays by William Shakespeare. He gained recognition for the novel Khodedan (1950), which tells the story of Armenians from his native region of Sasun as they rebuild their lives following the Armenian genocide. His other novel, Ranchparneri kanche (The call of the plowmen, 1979), is about the Armenian national liberation movement in the Ottoman Empire. He also authored Tigran Mets (Tigranes the Great, 1947), a historical tragedy in verse.

== Biography ==
Khachik Dashtents, whose birth name was Khachik Avetisyan, (Note: According to Dashtents's own account, he forgot his surname after being orphaned. He only remembered his father's name, Tono, so he was given the surname Tonoyan. Later, he found out that his real family name was Avetisyan.) was born into a shepherd's family on May 25, 1910, in Dashtadem, a village in the historical region of Sasun in the Bitlis vilayet of the Ottoman Empire. He later adopted the pen name Dashtents, based on the name of his native village (and in imitation of the poet Yeghishe Charents). He was orphaned during the Armenian genocide and received refuge and education from American humanitarian organizations in Alexandropol (modern-day Gyumri, Armenia). He briefly worked as a village teacher, then moved to Yerevan. He graduated from Yerevan State University in 1932 and then worked for the newspaper Avangard. That same year, he published his first collection of poems, titled Yergeri girk (Book of songs), with the help of Yeghishe Charents. He published two more poetry collections in the following years: Garnanayin yerger (Spring songs, 1934) and Bots (Flame, 1936).

Dashtents's love of Shakespeare drove him to enroll in the English department of the Moscow State Linguistic University, (Note: Called the Moscow State Pedagogical Institute of Foreign Languages at the time.) from which he graduated in 1940. It was at this time that he began translating Shakespeare's works into Armenian. Over the years, he translated The Comedy of Errors, The Taming of the Shrew, Twelfth Night, The Merry Wives of Windsor, Richard III, Julius Caesar, Antony and Cleopatra, Timon of Athens, King Lear, Romeo and Juliet, and other tragedies and historical plays by Shakespeare. For his translations, he was made a member of the Deutsche Shakespeare-Gesellschaft (German Shakespeare Society) in 1973. His other translations from English include Henry Wadsworth Longfellow's epic poem The Song of Hiawatha, Robert Browning's poem The Pied Piper of Hamelin, and William Saroyan's plays My Heart is in the Highlands and The Parsley Garden.

During World War II, Dashtents moved to the village of Irind in Armenia and worked on a collective farm as a political worker, laboring on the farm by day and writing by night. His impressions from the villagers—who, like him, were mostly refugees from the region of Sasun—inspired the novel Khodedan, published in 1950. In 1947, Dashtents published Tigran Mets (Tigranes the Great), a historical tragedy in verse. He gained widespread recognition for the novel Khodedan, which tells the tragic story of Western Armenians during World War I. It follows Armenians from Sasun as they rebuild their lives following the genocide. He published another collection of poetry titled Leran tsaghikner (Mountain flowers) in 1963 and the long poem Fayton Aleke (Phaeton Alek) in 1967. His second novel, Ranchparneri kanche (The call of the plowmen), was published posthumously in 1979. This work is about the Armenian national liberation movement in the Ottoman Empire.

Dashtents taught at a number of institutions in Yerevan: Yerevan State University (1940–1941), the Bryusov Institute for Foreign Languages (1941–1948), and the Polytechnic Institute (1960–1966). In 1965, he received the degree of Candidate of Philological Sciences. From 1965 to 1974, he worked at the Institute of Art of the Armenian SSR Academy of Sciences. Besides his literary works and translations, he also authored the studies Bayrone yev hayere (Byron and the Armenians, 1959) and Eghdzyal aygabatsi yergiche (The singer of the desired sunrise, 1967); the latter work is about Yeghishe Charents.

Dashtents died in Yerevan on March 9, 1974.

== Notes ==
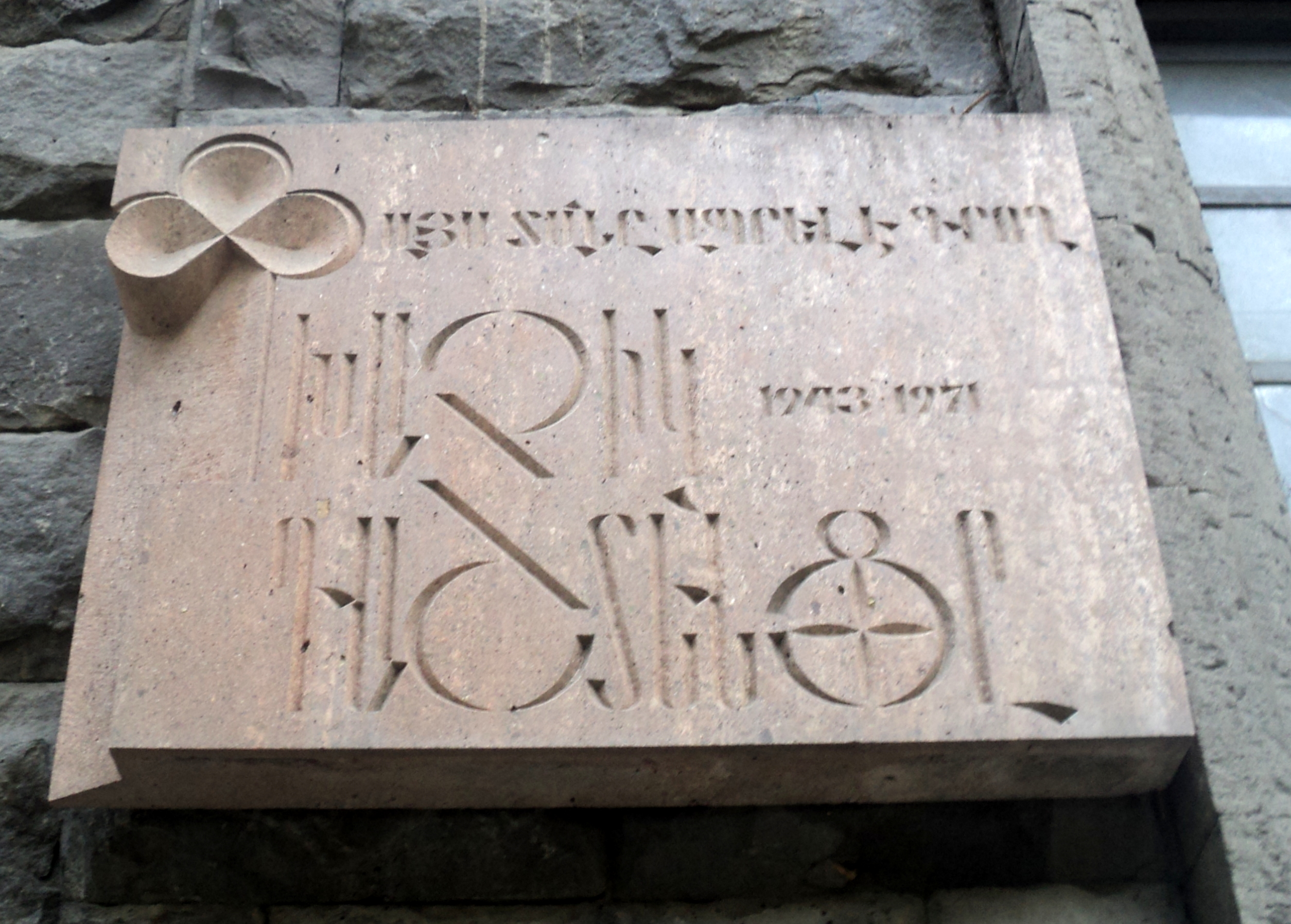
Memorial plaque of Khachik Dashtents on Mashtots Avenue in Yerevan
