= Bahçesaray, Van =

District of Van Province, Turkey

Bahçesaray
- District and municipality
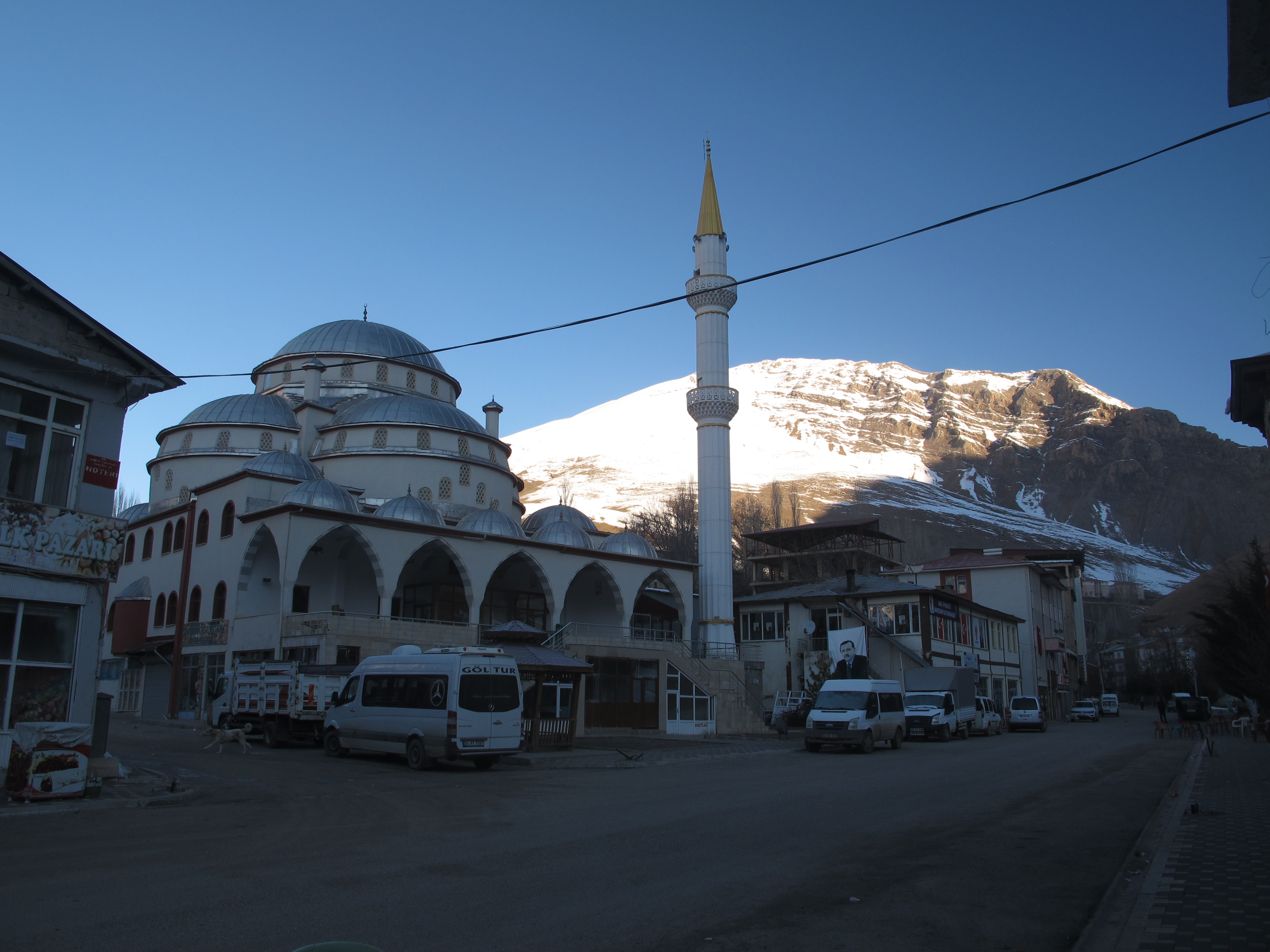
- Central mosque in Bahçesaray

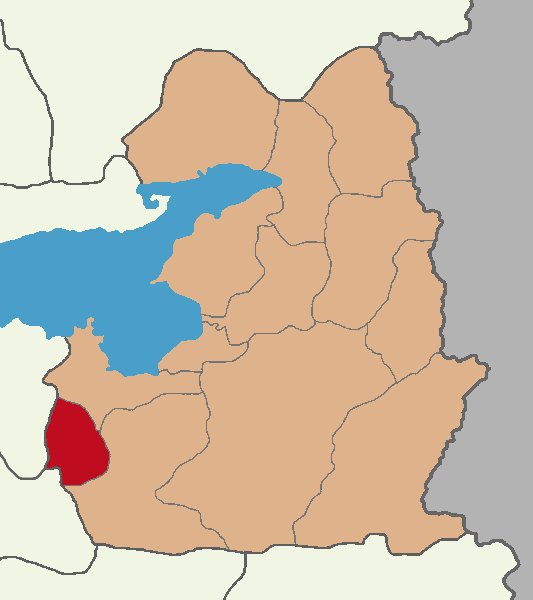
- Map showing Bahçesaray District in Van Province

- Location within Turkey
- Coordinates: 38°07′43″N 42°48′27″E
- Country: Turkey
- Province: Van

Government
  - Mayor: Harun Arslanargun (State Appointment)
- Area: 426 km^{2} (164 sq mi)
- Population (2022): 13,495
  - Density: 31.7/km^{2} (82.0/sq mi)
- Time zone: UTC+3 (TRT)
- Postal code: 65710
- Area code: 0432
- Website: www.bahcesaray.bel.tr

Bahçesaray (Armenian: Մոկս, romanized: Moks, Kurdish: Miks) is municipality and district of Van Province, Turkey. Its area is 426 km^{2}, and its population is 13,495 (2022). It was a bucak in Pervari District of Siirt Province until 1964 and in Gevaş district of Van Province between 1964 and 1987. It is at a distance of 110 kilometres (68 mi) from Van. The town is built on the banks of the Bahçesaray River.

== History ==
The district corresponds to Historical Armenia's Mok Arandznak district, which was part of the greater province of Moxoene. The district has several ancient Armenian monasteries and churches. The Aparank monastery is located in the vicinity of the town.

In the 19th century Bahçesaray was the center of the Kurdish Emirate of Miks, until the emirate was defeated by troops of the Ottoman Empire in 1846.

=== 2020 avalanches ===
On 4 and 5 February 2020, a pair of avalanches struck a highway in the district, leaving at least 41 people dead and 84 others injured.

== Composition ==
There are 20 neighbourhoods in Bahçesaray District:

- Akyayla
- Altındere
- Altıntaş
- Arvas
- Bağcılar
- Çatbayır
- Cevizlibelen
- Çiçekli
- Çömlekçi
- Elmayaka
- Fekiye Teyran
- Güneyyamaç
- İslam
- Kaşıkçılar
- Paşaköy
- Şişli
- Ulubeyli
- Ünlüce
- Yaşlıkavak
- Yaylakonak
