= Horizon Weekly =

Armenian newspaper in Canada

Horizon Weekly (Հորիզոն in Armenian) is an Armenian Canadian newspaper publication and is the official political newspaper of the Armenian Revolutionary Federation (ARF)'s Canadian Central Committee.

== History ==
Canada's Horizon Armenian Weekly was first published in 1979, sharing its birthday with Armenia's first Independence Day, May 28.

Born as the official political organ of Canada's Armenian Revolutionary Federation (ARF) Central Committee, Horizon was first conceived during ARF Canada's first regional meeting held in 1977. During its first two years, until March 1981, Horizon was run by different editorial boards.

In March 1981, a three-member editorial board was established with Vrej-Armen Artinian, Antranik Bedrossian and Levon Benguian. A couple of years later, Vrej-Armen Artinian became the first editor-in-chief and held the title for a decade. Giro Manoyan took over as Horizon's second editor-in-chief until his move to Armenia in 1999. Vahakn Karakashian, then the editor-in-chief of Boston's Hairenik Weekly, was invited to Montreal, and has since been at the helm of the newspaper.

== Supplements ==
Horizon Weekly publishes several supplements, including Horizon Kragan (in Armenian Հորիզոն Գրական) the only Armenian monthly literary publication in the Diaspora. Edited by Vrej-Armen Artinian, this supplement brings together the works of talented writers across the Diaspora. The literary supplement has an editorial committee.

Other Horizon supplements include a youth page, called Mangabadanegan Horizon (in Armenian Մանկապատանեկան Հորիզոն) reborn in May 2000, thanks to the contributions from Canada's regional executive committee of the Armenian Relief Society and its local chapters, who saw the importance of publishing such an educational, yet diverting tool. More than 200 youths actively participate in the monthly brainteasers, whereas more than 800 copies of the youth supplement are freely distributed in Armenian schools in Toronto and Montreal. All winners are awarded prizes from the weekly. The editor of the youth supplement is Zepur Assadourian and later Sona Titizian. Armenian Relief Society also publishes is annual supplement Lradou (in Armenian Լրատու) as part of Horizon. Lradou has been published since 1992.

Horizon also publishes since late 2016 the monthly supplement Lousavoritch (in Armenian Լուսաւորիչ), a religious supplement prepared by the Armenian Prelacy of Canada (of the Holy See of Cilicia).

Since 2000, a great number of thematic supplements have been published, covering a wide array of topics, such as, Artsakh, Shoushi, Javakhk, The Armenian genocide, the first Republic of Armenia, the 1700th anniversary of Armenian Christianity, Nakhichevan's Khachkars and so forth.

Horizon is trilingual as it also publishes English and French weekly supplements, on the basis of two pages weekly in each of the two language. The editor of the English and French weekly supplements is Viken Aprahamian. Since 2010, Viken Aprahamian is also the editor of Horizon's monthly literary supplement with Vrej-Armen Artinian continuing as senior editor of the literary supplement.

== Volunteers ==
Horizon Weekly has many volunteers who have contributed their time, even across long distances and include France's former Radio AYP director Hagop Balian, photographers Hawk Khacherian and Kaloust Babian, columnists Soliné Chamlian and Diroug Manjikian, long-time contributors Krikor Hotoyan, Sako Ghazarian, Aris Babikian and Journalist Karin Saghdedjian from Toronto, New York's Associated Press Photo Director of the Middle-Eastern division Harry Koundakjian, political analyst Khachig Der Ghougassian from Argentina, Journalist Nayiri Megerdichian from Yerevan and many free lance contributors from Armenia and Artsakh..

The French and English sections include the following contributors, section editor Tina Soulahian, Varant Yessayan, Lalai Manjikian, Mary Nercessian, Taline Abrakian, Raffi Boudjikanian and Lory Hovsepian. Horizon Weekly also has other contributors in different communities and includes the Horizon editorial board of Toronto and all the writers of the literary supplement, as well as the French and English sections of Horizon's yearly special issue.

== Yearly special issues ==
The publication keeps the tradition of publishing a year-end Special issue that started in 2001. The issues in glossy paper and full colour covered the political, social and cultural aspects of Armenia and the diaspora.

== Honors ==
On the occasion of the 25th anniversary of the Canadian Ethnic Press Council, the council had organized an Ethnic Press Day in Toronto on September 1, 2002. During this event, the Council honoured eight ethnic newspapers from across Canada, including Horizon Weekly, which was the only Quebec publication to take home the title. The eight newspapers were chosen from more than 800 ethnic publications in 125 languages. The award was presented to Vahakn Karakachian by Canada's former Heritage Minister Sheila Copps. Horizon Weekly is currently a member of the Ethnic Press Council of Canada and participates in Council meetings through its representative in Toronto.

In November 2009, Seneca college (Toronto) hosted more than 225 members of Canada's ethnic media for The 2009 National Ethnic Press and Media Council (NEPMC) Seminar. The three-day seminar, running from November 19 to 22 brought together members of the ethnic media, provincial and national dignitaries, Seneca experts and dignitaries including Stephen Harper, Prime Minister of Canada; Jason Kenney, Minister of Citizenship, Immigration and Multiculturalism. During this event, 12 ethnic newspapers, including Horizon were honoured. The prime minister personally handed the awards to the editors of those publications. "Our government will continue to collaborate with cultural media and communities in pursuit of a common vision of a stronger, richer sense of Canadian citizenship," said the Prime Minister.

== Website and other media ==
Horizon Weekly was the first Armenian publication on the international scene to have its own website during the 90s. However, during the first three years of the 21st century, the weekly could no longer be found on the internet. In 2003, the Central Committee presented a detailed report regarding Horizon's site and www.horizonweekly.ca was launched in May 2004.

== See also ==
- Armenians in Canada
- List of newspapers in Canada
