= Moxoene =

Historical province of Greater Armenia

Mokk / Moxoene Մոկք
- Province of Kingdom of Armenia
- 3rd century AD–8th century AD
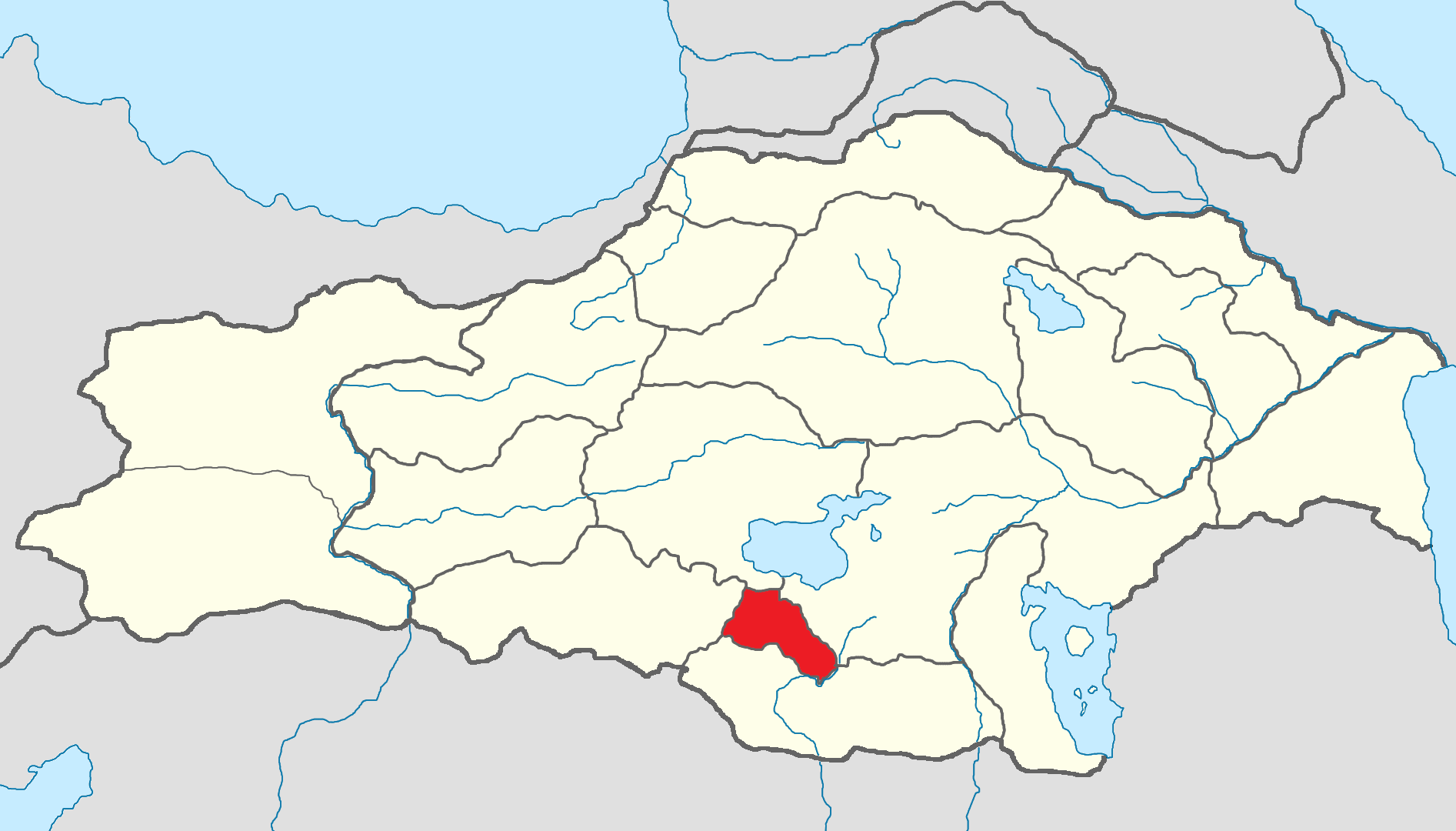
- Location of Mokk within Armenia
- Capital: Moks
- Historical era: Antiquity / Middle Ages
  - Established: 3rd century AD
  - Disestablished: 8th century AD
- Today part of: Turkey

Mokk (Old Armenian: Մոկք, romanized: Mokkʻ) or Moks (Մոկս), also known by the Greco-Roman name Moxoene, was a region and principality of the ancient Kingdom of Greater Armenia. It was bordered by Vaspurakan to the north and east, Arzanene (Ałdznik) to the west, and Corduene to the south. The administrative center of the province was the fortress-city of Moks (today's Bahçesaray in the Van Province of Turkey).

Mokk is the smallest of the fifteen Armenian provinces (ashkharh) listed in the 7th-century AD geographical treatise Ashkharhatsuyts. However, it was actually the third largest of the many principalities that made up Greater Armenia in antiquity. The highly mountainous region played an important defensive role, and the princes of Mokk were among the most powerful in Armenia.

The formation of Mokk as an administrative unit took place much later than the other provinces of Greater Armenia. According to historian Babken Harutyunyan, it most likely developed as a separate province no earlier than the 3rd century AD.

== Name ==
The name Mokkʻ may be connected with that of the Mushki mentioned in Assyrian sources and the Moskhoi of classical sources. It is possible that the region was once inhabited by the Mushki, whose name survives in a number of place names in Armenia and Georgia. Or it may be related to the name of the Moxeanoi, a tribe in eastern Phrygia mentioned by Ptolemy (2nd century AD). Nicholas Adontz connected Mokkʻ to the name of the Mykoi or Mycians, a people mentioned by Herodotus. Suren Yeremian believed that Mokkʻ came from the name of a tribe related to the Armenians (or themselves "Thraco-Armenian") and who are mentioned in Pliny the Elder's Natural History (1st century AD) as the Moschenae, related to the Moxeanoi known to Ptolemy. As the philologist Heinrich Hübschmann writes, it is not clear whether Mokkʻ also referred to the inhabitants of the region, just as Haykʻ in Old Armenian referred to both the people and the country of Armenia; the singular form *Mok is not attested. The Greco-Roman name for the region is Moxoene; Hübschmann notes that the presence of the second o is unexplained (the expected form would be *Mokene or, if based on the Armenian accusative form Moks, *Moxene). It was known in Syriac as Beth Moksāyē, and the 9th-century Muslim author al-Baladhuri called it Muks. The name survived into modern times in the name of the town of Moks, called Müküs or Mikis in Turkish until it was renamed Bahçesaray.

== Geography ==
Mokk occupied the middle section of the basin of the Jerm River (the modern-day Botan River) and was located approximately 70–80 kilometers north of the southern frontier of Greater Armenia. It bordered Vaspurakan to the north and east, Arzanene (Armenian: Ałdznikʻ) to the west, and Corduene (Armenian: Korchaykʻ) to the south. A list of Mokk's districts is given in the Ashkharhatsuyts, although this section of the work has been interpreted differently by scholars. According to Suren Yeremian (followed by Robert H. Hewsen), Mokk had only eight districts: Ishayr, Myus Ishayr, Ishots, Aruenits Dzor, Mija, Mokk Arandznak (also known as the Arkayits gavar 'royal district'), Argastovit, and Jermadzor. Babken Harutyunyan states that Yeremian incorrectly conflated Mokk Arandznak and Arkayits gavar, and that the actual number of districts was nine (as stated in the Ashkharhatsuyts).

Mokk is the smallest of the fifteen Armenian provinces (ashkharh) listed in the Ashkharhatsuyts, which presents Greater Armenia as a country divided into fifteen well-defined provinces and subdivided into 200 districts. However, according to Hewsen, the Ashkharhatsuyts does not accurately reflect the internal divisions of Armenia, and the fifteen provinces described in the work "were established at different epochs and were of different kinds and origins." Mokk was actually the third largest of the many principalities that made up Greater Armenia, and its princes played a major role in Armenian politics as long as they retained their autonomy. Yeremian estimates its area as 2,962 square kilometres (1,144 sq mi). Harutyunyan, contrary to several other scholars, holds that the principality of Mokk and the region of Mokk did not correspond entirely in territory, at least initially.

Mokk was a highly mountainous and heavily forested region. Even into the early 20th century, a significant portion of the local population lived in relative isolation, and the transport of goods was frequently carried out by human porters rather than pack animals due to the rugged terrain. The valleys lying between the various ridges that passed through the region were suitable for agriculture and livestock raising. It also had metal mines. Mokk had no large cities. Its center was the town of Moks, today's Bahçesaray (formerly called Müküs or Mikis) in the Van Province of Turkey.

== History ==
In the 9th century BC, the territory of Mokk was incorporated into the Kingdom of Urartu (Van). According to Suren Yeremian, the territory of Mokk corresponds to the country of Hubushkia mentioned in Assyrian sources, which along with other lands seceded from Urartu after the campaign of Sargon II in 714 BC. Yeremian also identifies Mokk with the land of Pactyice mentioned by Herodotus as neighboring Armenia. Later, the territory was included in Orontid Armenia, first a satrapy of the Achaemenid Empire and later an independent Armenian kingdom. Babken Harutyunyan connects the emergence of Mokk as a separate province with the invasion of Armenia by the Sasanian Empire in the 3rd century AD. Per Harutyunyan, Armenia was forced to cede certain southern territories to the Sasanians, but managed to keep the strategically important eastern part of Arzanene (Ałdznik), which became the separate province of Mokk and remained as such after most of those southern regions were returned to Armenia.

In 298, the Romans defeated the Sasanians and concluded the Peace of Nisibis, according to which the southern Armenian districts of Sophene (Tsopk), Ingilene (Angełtun), Arzanene, Corduene (Korduk) and Zabdicene (Tsawdek) passed from the Persian to the Roman sphere of influence. According to Harutyunyan, Rome soon returned these territories to Armenia. However, according to Nina Garsoïan they remained internally autonomous protectorates of Rome ("civitates foederatae liberae et immunes"). Some scholars believe they could have submitted to both Rome and the Armenian king since the latter was a client of Rome, but this has been disputed by others. Mokk is not named among the districts that came under Roman suzerainty in 298, but since it is identified as one of the lands lost by Rome to the Sasanians in 363 (following the ill-fated Persian campaign of the emperor Julian), some scholars assert that Mokk was also part of the 298 treaty; for example, Adontz thought that Mokk was a part of Arzanene and passed to Rome together with that territory, whereas Michał Marciak and others believe that it is more likely that Mokk was grouped together with Corduene. According to Harutyunyan, Armenian military victories under King Pap (r. 370–374) reversed the territorial changes of the 363 Perso-Roman treaty. Following the partition of Greater Armenia in 387 between the Eastern Roman and Sasanian empires, Mokk was included in the eastern Armenian kingdom under Sasanian control. After the abolition of the Armenian Arsacid monarchy in 428, it was integrated into the Sasanian marzpanate of Armenia.

The principality of Mokk was ruled by a homonymous princely house of "immemorial dynastic origin". Ruling one of the largest principalities in Armenia, the princes of Mokk played a prominent role in the country's politics. According to the Zōrnamak ("Military List"), they provided the Armenian king with a 1000 strong cavalry force. In the Armenian history attributed to Agathangelos, the prince of Mokk is listed among the members of Tiridates III the Great's royal entourage during his supposed visit to Rome. The princes of Mokk maintained their autonomy after the fall of the Arsacids. The prince of Mokk participated in the Armenian rebellion against the Sasanians led by Vardan Mamikonian in 451. During the Battle of Avarayr, the prince of Mokk served as an assistant commander of the first military corps of the Armenian army. Mokk remained in the Persian sector of Armenia following the new partition of Armenia between the Byzantines and the Sasanians in 591.

In the early 8th century, a branch of the Bagratuni family established its rule in Mokk. In the second half of the 9th century, Mokk came under the rule of the Artsrunis of Vaspurakan. After 907, a branch of the Artsrunis established itself as lords of Mokk. In the second half of the 10th century, the Byzantine Empire sought to extend its influence over Mokk to facilitate the eventual annexation of Vaspurakan. According to the Armenian historian Stepanos Asoghik, a prince of Mokk, Zapranik, became a Byzantine general and supported the rebellion of Bardas Skleros against Basil II. Following the fall of the Kingdom of Vaspurakan in 1021, Mokk was annexed to Byzantium, but the local Artsrunis continued to recognize the overlordship of the Khedenekians, a surviving branch of the Artsruni dynasty in Vaspurakan. In the second half of the 12th century, the lords of Mokk were allied with the Tornikians (a branch of the Mamikonians) of Sasun.

Nomadic Kurdish tribes settled in Mokk starting from the 13th century. In the early 16th century, the territory of Mokk was conquered by the Ottoman Empire. Under Ottoman rule, it was incorporated into the Van Eyalet as a distinct sanjak under the name Moks. Between the 16th and 19th centuries, semi-independent Armenian communities, headed by Armenian meliks (hereditary leaders, possibly of Artsruni descent) managed to survive in Mokk. The hereditary landowners were Armenians and, in some areas, Kurds. The local economy thrived on viticulture, cotton cultivation, oilseed farming, and beekeeping. During the Armenian genocide of 1915, the Armenian population of Mokk's 49 villages—totaling over 900 families—was forcibly deported and largely perished along the deportation routes. The few survivors crossed into Eastern Armenia, settling in the regions of Talin, Ashtarak, and the Lake Sevan basin.

=== Church history ===
Following the partition of Greater Armenia in 387, several border provinces were detached from the eastern Armenian kingdom and transformed into independent administrative zones or attached to neighboring foreign districts. During this era, the Syriac Church of the East, leveraging political backing from the Sasanian court, gradually expanded its ecclesiastic jurisdiction into the southern marches of Armenia, particularly the trans-Tigritane regions. The Church of the East succeeded in establishing a diocese even within Mokk, which remained administratively bound to the eastern Armenian kingdom. This development does not imply the absence of an Armenian episcopate in Mokk; according to Harutyunyan, it is highly probable that both church structures operated in parallel for a certain duration. In the 4th and 5th centuries, the Sasanian royal court routinely used the Church of the East as a political counterweight against the ecclesiastic influence of the Roman Empire.

During the reign of the Sasanian king Yazdegerd I (r. 399–420), permission was granted to convene an official synod of the Church of the East to regulate its activities and strengthen the status of the Catholicosate of Ctesiphon. Records from the synod, convened on 1 February 410, indicate that the Ctesiphon structure was divided into six major metropolitan provinces. The Metropolitan See of Nisibis encompassed five bishoprics: Arzn, Korduk, Zabdicene, Rehimene, and Mokk. In Syriac ecclesiastical sources, Mokk is recorded as Beth Moksāyē. The acts of the synod of 410 were signed by Bishop Daniel of Beth Moksāyē, confirming the presence of an organized Syriac diocese in Mokk by the start of the 5th century.

== Administrative divisions ==
According to the long recension of the Ashkharhatsuyts, Mokk was divided into nine cantons (gavars):

- Ishayr
- Myus Ishayr (The Other Ishayr)
- Ishots gavar
- Arvenits dzor (or Arruenits dzor), with its center at Arvants (Arruants)
- Midja, with its center at Midja
- Mokk Arandznak, with its center at Moks
- Arkayits gavar (The Canton of the King)
- Argastovit
- Jermadzor, with its center at the settlement of Shatakh

The same source mentions that Mokk possessed substantial pastoral resources and was highly regarded for its rich pastures and game fowl.

The short recension of the Ashkharhatsuyts does not diverge fundamentally from the long version in its description of Mokk. According to the short text, Mokk was considered the fifth province of Greater Armenia, positioned east of Aldznik within the rugged strongholds of the Taurus Mountains. This variant similarly attributes nine cantons to the province. By cross-referencing surviving manuscript variants, the historical layout of Mokk can be reconstructed: it was the fifth province of Greater Armenia, situated east of Aldznik in the Taurus range, and comprised nine cantons. The description also records the Vorb River in the Arandznak Mokk canton and the Jerm River in Jermadzor. The treatise notes the presence of rare flora and fauna in Mokk, specifically highlighting exotic fruits known as arshak and manragor (mandrake), alongside beautifully spotted leopards (lynxes) and partridges.

Suren Eremyan proposed a textual emendation to the passage, interpreting the phrase "the Arandznak Mokats canton, in which is the river Vorb, the Arkayits canton" as a description of a single combined unit. In his view, Arandznak Mokats was synonymous with Arkayits gavar. This emendation reduced the total number of cantons from nine to eight. However, B. Harutyunyan argued that this modification lacks sufficient manuscript backing, as no surviving copy of the Ashkharhatsuyts lists the canton count of Mokk as eight. Furthermore, the name Arkayits gavar implies a crown domain, whereas Arandznak Mokk served as the political seat and residential domain of the hereditary Mokats princes.

=== Toponymy and location of cantons ===
Reconstructing the exact topography of Mokk's cantons remains challenging, as only three or four possess clear geographic identifiers. Mokk Arandznak was located in the valley of the Vorb (Moks) River, which later became known as the Moks-su or Mukus-su. The princely center of Moks, later known as Mukus, was situated in this valley.

Ghoukas Injijian located the canton of Arvenits dzor in a river valley roughly six hours' travel southwest of Moks. This positioning was subsequently supported by Ghevont Alishan, Heinrich Hübschmann, and Leo. However, S. Eremyan later adjusted this placement, shifting Arvenits dzor to the far northwest of Mokk, nestled between the cantons of Yerevanq and Rshtuniq in the Oransdaras valley. B. Harutyunyan accepts this adjusted positioning, citing the geographical sequence of cantons in the Ashkharhatsuyts text and corroborating narrative records. This is further supported by Thomas Artsruni's account, which places Arvanits dzor precisely along the border zone between Rshtuniq and Mokk. Over time, through dialectal shifts, the name of the village of Arvants changed to Avrants, Orants, or Orrents, eventually shifting under Kurdish phonetic influence to Oranis or Orans, giving rise to the name of the Oransdaras valley.

The canton of Jermadzor is also reasonably well-defined, though it has been subject to varied interpretations. Gh. Alishan equated Jermadzor directly with Shatakh. Drawing on the geographic surveys of Hartmann, Hoffmann, and Wünsch, H. Hübschmann placed it in the valley of the Jerm River (Bohtan-su), slightly west of Shatakh. A key geographical anchor for Jermadzor is the historical fortress of Zrayl (or Zrel), whose ruins are preserved under the local name Zrelkalasi. Hübschmann argued that Jermadzor lay west of the Zrel stronghold, which acted as a climatic dividing line between the temperate and warmer zones of the Eastern Tigris basin. S. Eremyan delineated the borders of Jermadzor starting from the vicinity of the Zrayl fortress and extending to the confluence of the Jerm and Ketsan rivers. B. Harutyunyan, however, notes that the western limits of Jermadzor must have reached slightly further west than this confluence, as placing the Aldznik cantons of Erkhetq and Ketik within the Ketsan basin is geographically improbable.

Thomas Artsruni mentions Jermadzor in connection with Vardan Mamikonian's operations in Mokk, noting that he took refuge within the deep recesses of the Taurus range, specifically in the mountains of Jermadzor at the Zrayl fortress. The same author explicitly states elsewhere that Jermadzor and the Zrayl fortress were integral parts of Mokk. The location of Jermadzor is also verified by the medieval chronicler Mesrop Erats, who records the canton of Jermadzor alongside the strongholds of Tmorik and the Alko fortress.

The name of the Jermadzor canton is derived from the Jerm River. In surviving copies of the Ashkharhatsuyts, the river's name is preserved with a scribal error as "Merm." In Byzantine and Arabic sources, the same river appears under different variants: Agathias utilizes a Hellenized form of Jerm, while Yaqut al-Hamawi records it as Wadi ar-Razm or Wadi az-Zarm.

Gh. Injijian suggested that Jermadzor corresponds to the "Termatzou" fortress mentioned by Byzantine Emperor Constantine VII Porphyrogenitus. However, subsequent researchers demonstrated that Constantine VII's Termatzou must be identified with Sermants, located northwest of Harq, near the Euphrates. This identification is considered far more accurate, as Jermadzor was never under the control of the Kaysite amirate, whereas the events described by Constantine VII are explicitly tied to Harq and its adjacent districts.

Analysis of the geographic sequence suggests that the Ashkharhatsuyts recorded the cantons of Mokk moving from south to north and then toward the east. Given that Arvenits dzor occupied the extreme northwestern edge of Mokk, it is inferred that the cantons of Ishayr, Myus Ishayr, and Ishots gavar were situated within the basin of the Ketsan River. Ishayr was likely located in the valley of the Havkischay (a right-bank tributary of the Ketsan) and its adjacent left-bank tracts. If this holds true, Myus Ishayr must have lain further north, extending toward Arvenits dzor in the vicinity of Khizan. Ishots gavar was likely positioned on the left bank of the Ketsan, around Aghakis, old Yeghegis, and Spaykert. Following this progression past Midja, Mokk Arandznak occupied the main valley of the Moks River. The remaining cantons of Mokk would thus occupy the southern sectors of the province.

Opinions vary regarding the location of Arkayits gavar. Gh. Alishan placed it between Moks and Shatakh. However, B. Harutyunyan argues it is more accurately sought in the basin of the Eastern Tigris or Jerm River, west of Jermadzor. Arkayits gavar may have originally been a section of Jermadzor, but its status as a royal crown estate likely led to its administrative separation into an independent canton. For the canton of Argastovit, S. Eremyan’s reconstruction is widely accepted, placing the southern cantons of Mokk in a west-to-east sequence: Arkayits gavar, Argastovit, and Jermadzor.
