= Artsruni dynasty =

Armenian noble family

Artsruni Արծրունի
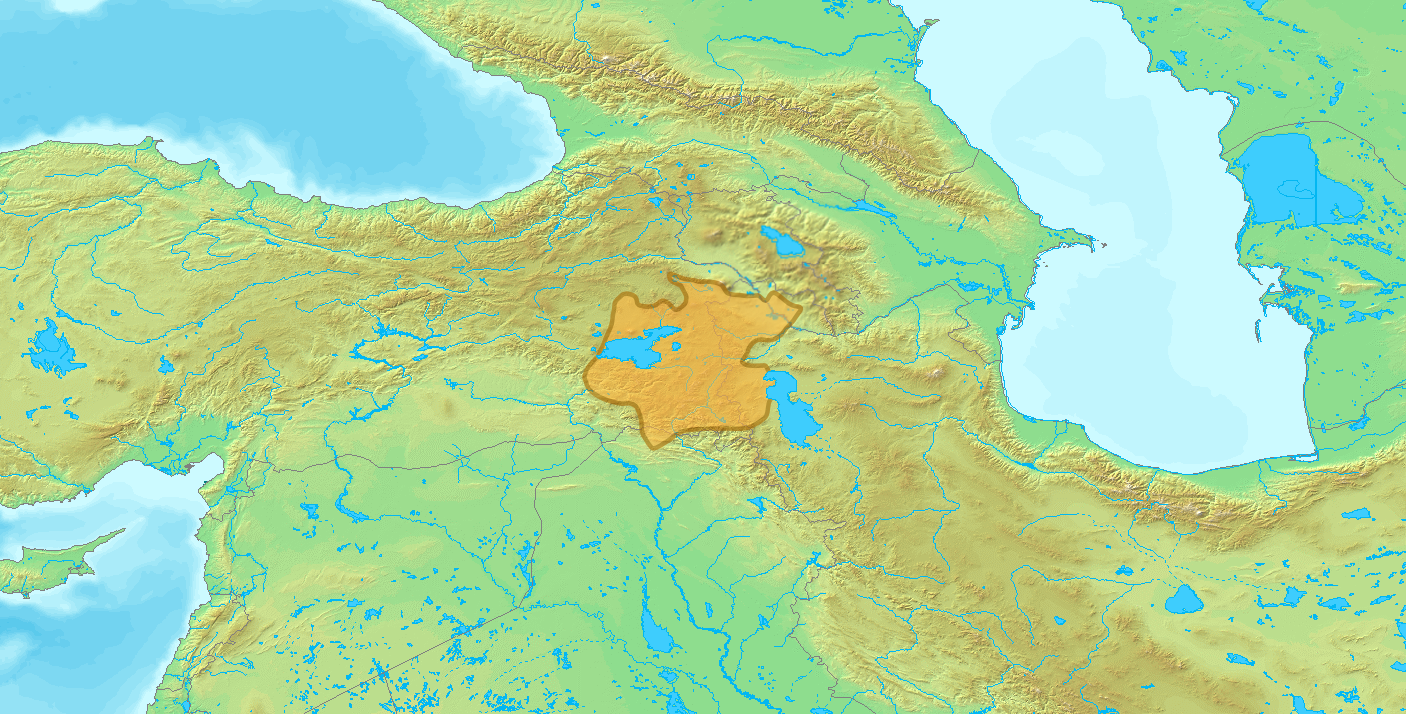
- Territorial area of the Artsrunids in the 11th century
- Parent house: Orontid dynasty
- Country: Armenia
- Founded: 69 BC
- Founder: Mithrobarzanes (Mithrobuzanes)
- Current head: Extinct
- Final ruler: Senekerim-Hovhannes
- Titles: King of Armenia (claim); King of Vaspurakan; Prince of Vaspurakan; Katepano of Sebasteia
- Dissolution: 1080 AD

The House of Artsruni (Armenian: Արծրունի; also Ardzruni or Artsrunid) was an ancient princely and, later, royal dynasty of Armenia.

== Name ==
The name Artsruni contains the ending -uni, which is widespread in old Armenian family names. The early Armenian historian Movses Khorenatsi derives the name from artsui 'eagle' (արծուի, alt. artsiv). He implies that the Artsrunis carried standards with eagles on them (Note: Armen Petrosyan interprets this as meaning that the Artsrunis were the standard bearers of the Armenian king.) and makes reference to a legend from Hadamakert (the center of the Artsrunis' home district of Aghbak) in which a bird protects a sleeping boy from the rain and sun; this is presumed to be a legend about the Artsrunis' ancestor (Sanasar, according to Manuk Abeghian) involving an eagle. James Russell notes that the eagle was a totemic animal for the Artsrunis and connects the dynasty's name with Urartian Arṣibini, which is attested as the name of an Urartian king's horse and may derive from Armenian artsui. (Note: Russell treats the Armenian word as a borrowing from an Urartian word, although it is only attested in Urartian as a horse's name and is interpreted to mean eagle because of its similarity to artsui. Martirosyan and Robert Beekes consider artsui to be a native Armenian word, while Calvert Watkins, following Charles de Lamberterie, considers it an Iranian borrowing.) On this basis, Russell suggests that the Artsrunis may have had Urartian ancestors.

Hrach Martirosyan writes that this connection of Artsruni with artsui 'eagle' is "quite attractive as far as the mythical context [surrounding the Artsrunis] is concerned" but is unlikely to be a true etymology. He instead proposes that Artsruni is a patronymic deriving from an unattested name *Arcr-ēš, meaning "having swift horses".

== Origins ==
The Artsrunis claimed descent from the Assyrian king Sennacherib (r. 705–681 BC). It mirrors the Bagratuni claim of Davidic descent and the Mamikonian claim of descent from the royal Han dynasty and is usually interpreted as a piece of genealogical mythology. The Armenian historian Movses Khorenatsi is the first to mention this claim. This tradition likely developed among those houses after the Christianization of Armenia in the early 4th century, drawing from the biblical account according to which Sennacherib's sons Adramelech and Sharezer fled to Armenia after murdering their father (Isaiah 37:38). Khorenatsi writes that the Armenian leader Skayordi settled one of the princes, Sanasar (biblical Sharezer), on the mountain of Sim (in the region of Sasun) and from him descended the Artsrunis and the Gnunis.

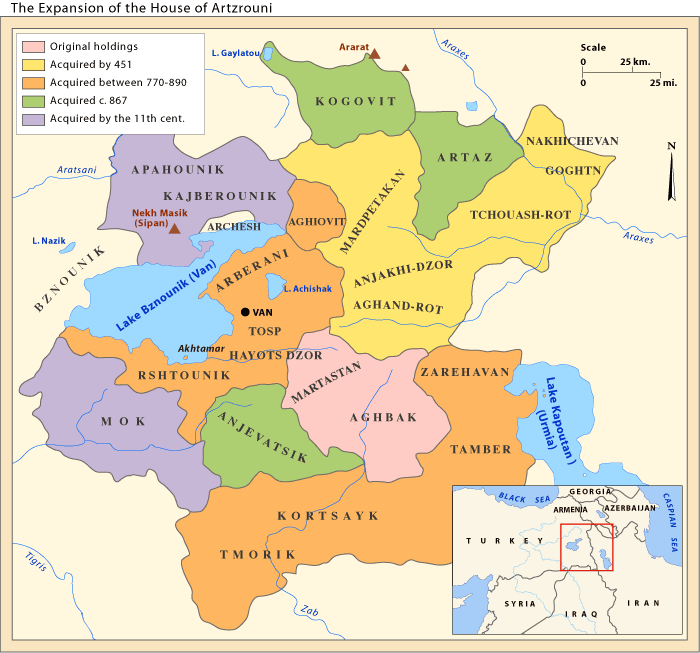
The Expansion of the House of Artsruni

On this basis of his connection of Artsruni with Urartian Arṣibini (see above), Russell suggests that the Artsrunis may have had Urartian ancestors. Vrezh Vardanyan writes that the dynasty was of purely local, Armenian origin and that they are mentioned in Urartian inscriptions as Arṣuniuni (Note: Giorgi Melikishvili considers this to be some common noun.) and lived southeast of Lake Van at that time.

According to the genealogist and historian Cyril Toumanoff, as well as historian M. Chahin, the Artsruni family were an offshoot of the earlier Orontids. Toumanoff, following Nicholas Adontz and Josef Markwart, suggests that Mithrobarzanes, the viceroy of Tigranes the Great in Sophene in 69 BC, may have been the earliest attested member of the family. Mithrobarzanes, or more precisely Mithrobuzanes, corresponds to Armenian Me(h)ruzhan, which was a common name among members of the Artsruni dynasty. Mithrobuzanes was also the name of the successor of Zariadres, a king of Sophene in the 2nd century BC who is thought to have been an Orontid. Markwart, Adontz and Toumanoff hypothesized that Mithrobuzanes, the viceroy of Tigranes, was a member of the Orontid branch which ruled Sophene as independent kings until Tigranes annexed Sophene to Greater Armenia. The Artsrunis are supposed to have ruled continued to rule Sophene, giving up their royal title but receiving the title of bdeashkh (vitaxa, 'viceroy' or 'margrave'). Then, according to Toumanoff, after the adoption of Christianity in Armenia, the Artsrunis obscured their Orontid origins with a genealogical myth drawn from the Bible.

== History ==
During the reign of the Arsacid dynasty over Armenia, the Artsrunis ruled the princely estates of Greater and Lesser Aghbak in Vaspurakan (around modern Başkale, Turkey), southeast of Lake Van, gradually annexing the surrounding territory. In the middle of the 4th century the family was deposed. Chavash survived, and recovered power. In 369 the state was led by Meruzhan Artsruni who guided Persian troops to Armenia, exchanged Christianity for Mazdaism, and defeated the General (sparapet) Mamikonian. The latter recovered power soon after, however, and Meruzhan was killed.

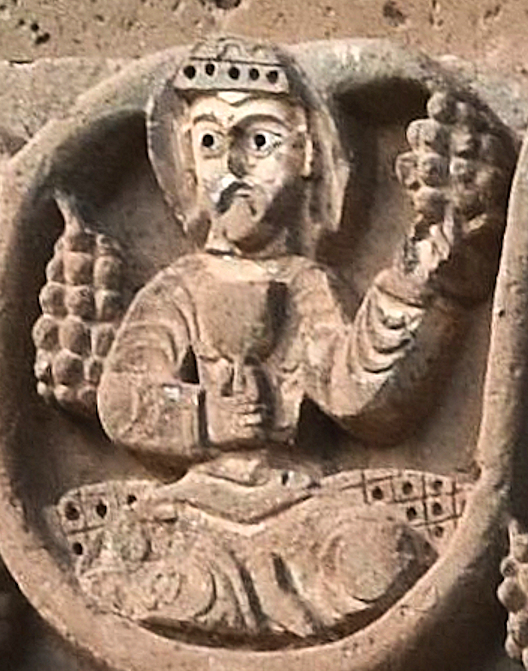
Assumed depiction of Gagik I Artsruni in the vine-scroll relief on the eastern façade of the Church of the Holy Cross (915–921)

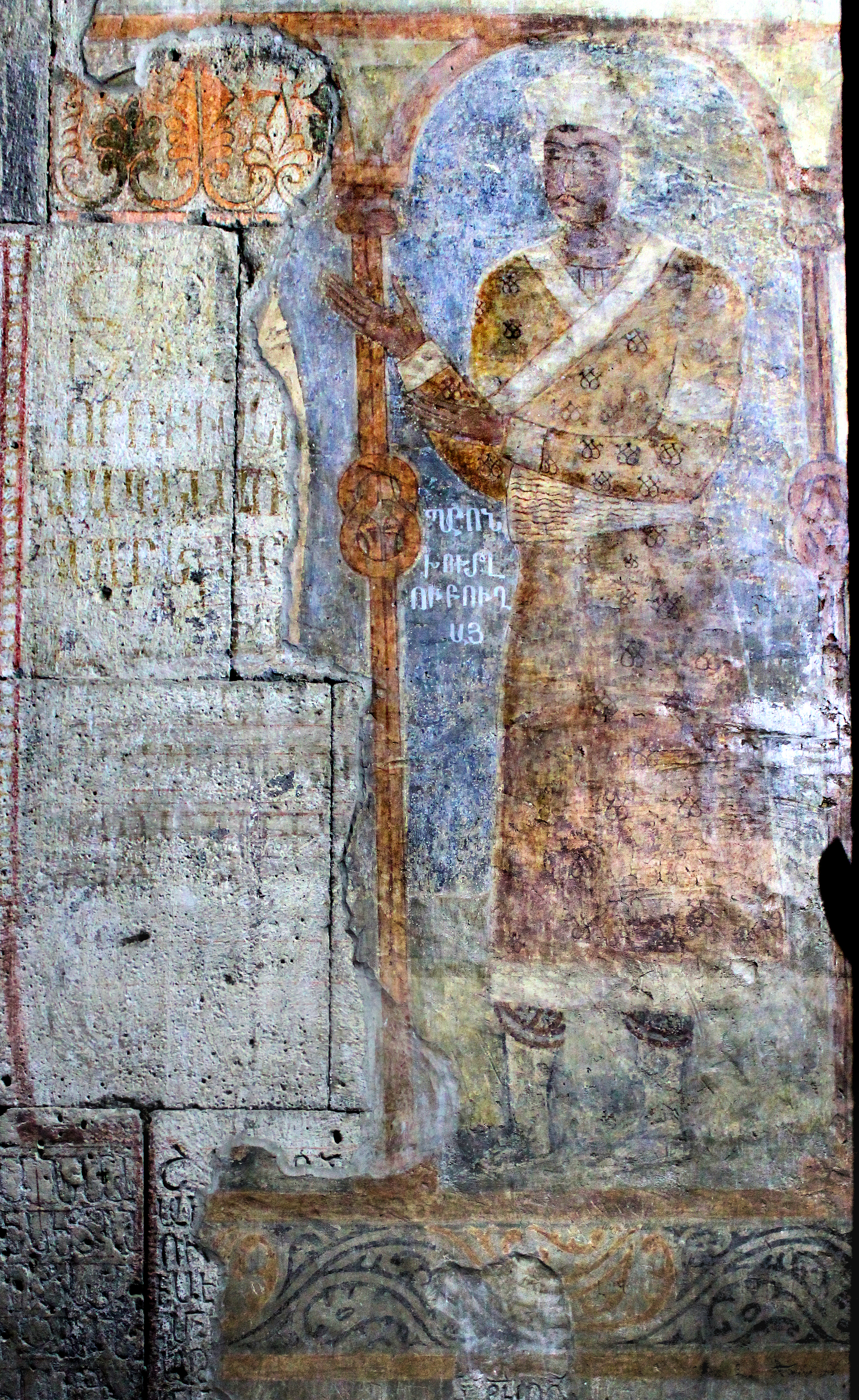
The Artsruni statesman Khutlubuga, 13th century CE. Church of the Holy Sign. Haghpat Monastery, southern wall.

Around 772 the Artsruni presided over the families of Amatuni, Rshtuni, Teruni of Daroynk (before a possession of the Bagratuni) and ruled the regions of Maku, Artaz, Great Zab Valley and Van river. In the same 8th century, the Bagratid dynasty, re-established the monarch of Armenia, and the Artsrunis were "among its most powerful vassals and rivals". When the territory of historical Armenia was, about a century later, succeeded by several subkingdoms (each of whom were rule by "lesser princes"), the area of Vaspurakan came to be ruled in by the Artsrunis, who, in 908, received their investiture from their Abbasid suzerains. Thus, Khatcḥik-Gagik II Artsruni was the first of the Artsrunis to rule Vaspurakan under Abbasid suzerainty.

Gagik I of Vaspurakan claimed the title of "King of Armenia" from the Bagratuni dynasty until his death in 936 or 943.

In the beginning of the 11th century, the Artsruni settled westwards in Cappadocia, retreating from eastern invaders. In 1021, Senekerim-Hovhannes of Vaspurakan was given Sebaste, Evdokia, and possibly Amasia as fiefdom from the Byzantine emperor Basil II in return for his entire kingdom. He and 14,000 of his retainers settled in the Theme of Sebasteia, while the Kingdom of Vaspurakan became the Byzantine theme of Vasprakania, which lasted for fifty years until 1071.

== Cultural legacy ==
The Artsrunis were patrons of the arts, which, as Toumanoff states, is evidenced in the "splendid tenth-century monuments of architecture and of fresco and miniature painting especially in the palace and the church of Aghtamar". These two constructions were built on the order of Khachik Gagik II. In the ninth and tenth centuries, a member of the house, Tovma Artsruni, wrote The History of the House of Artsruni.

== In popular culture ==
Umberto Eco introduced the character of Ardzrouni, a nobleman and alchemist in Cilicia, in his fantastic novel Baudolino.

== Sources ==
- Abeghian, Manuk (1966). Erker Երկեր [Works] (in Armenian). Vol. I. Yerevan: HSSH GA hratarakchʻutʻyun.
- Alboyadjian, Arshag (1952). Badmoutiun Yevtogio Hayots Պատմութիւն Եւդոկիոյ Հայոց [History of the Armenians of Evdokia]. Cairo: Nor Asdgh.
- Beekes, R. S. P. (2003). "Historical Phonology of Classical Armenian" (PDF). In Kortlandt, Frederik (ed.). Armeniaca: Comparative Notes. Ann Arbor, MI: Caravan Books. pp. 133–211. ISBN 978-0882061061.
- Chahin, M. (2001). The Kingdom of Armenia: A History. Psychology Press. ISBN 978-0700714520.
- Diakonoff, Igor M.; Kashkai, S. M. (1981). Geographical Names According to Urartian Texts. Weisbaden: L. Reichert. ISBN 978-3-88226-119-6.
- Hakobyan, Zaruhi A. (2021). "The Frescoes of the Haghpat Monastery in the Historical-Confessional Context of the 13th Century". Actual Problems of Theory and History of Art. 11: 256–267. doi:10.18688/aa2111-02-21.
- Martirosyan, Hrach (2019). "The Armenian Patronymic Arcruni". In Avetisyan, Pavel S.; Dan, Roberto; Grekyan, Yervand H. (eds.). Over the Mountains and Far Away: Studies in Near Eastern history and archaeology presented to Mirjo Salvini on the occasion of his 80th birthday. Summertown, Oxford: Archaeopress. pp. 331–336. doi:10.2307/j.ctvndv9f0.42. ISBN 978-1-78491-943-6. JSTOR j.ctvndv9f0.
- Martirosyan, Hrach (2013). "The place of Armenian in the Indo-European language family: the relationship with Greek and Indo-Iranian" (PDF). Journal of Language Relationship. 10: 85–137. doi:10.31826/jlr-2013-100107.
- McGeer, Eric; Nesbitt, John; Oikonomides, Nicolas, eds. (2001). Catalogue of Byzantine Seals at Dumbarton Oaks and in the Fogg Museum of Art, Volume 4: The East. Vol. 4. Washington, DC: Dumbarton Oaks Research Library and Collection. ISBN 0-88402-282-X.
- Moses Khorenatsʻi (1978). History of the Armenians. Translation and commentary by Robert W. Thomson. Cambridge, Massachusetts: Harvard University Press. ISBN 0-674-39571-9.
- Petrosyan, Armen (2002). The Indo-European and Ancient Near Eastern Sources of the Armenian Epic. Washington, D.C: Institute for the Study of Man. ISBN 9780941694810.
- Petrosyan, Armen (2000). "J. Ṛaseli «hayagitakan» hnaranknerě" Ջ. Ռասելի «հայագիտական» հնարանքները [J. Russell's 'Armenological' fabrications]. Patma-Banasirakan Handes (3): 241–257 – via Pan-Armenian Digital Library.
- Russell, James (1997). "The Formation of the Armenian Nation". In Hovannisian, Richard G. (ed.). The Armenian People from Ancient to Modern Times: From Antiquity to the Fourteenth Century. Palgrave Macmillan. pp. 19–36. ISBN 0-312-10168-6.
- Toumanoff, C. (1986). "Artsruni". In Yarshater, Ehsan (ed.). Encyclopædia Iranica. Vol. II/6: Art in Iran I–ʿArūż. London and New York: Routledge & Kegan Paul. pp. 664–665. ISBN 978-0-71009-106-2.
- Toumanoff, Cyril (1963). Studies in Christian Caucasian History. Georgetown University Press. OCLC 505712128.
- Tovma Artsruni; Anonymous (1978). Patmutʻyun Artsrunyatsʻ tan Պատմություն Արծրունյաց տան [History of the House of Artsruni] (in Armenian). Translation, introduction and commentary by Vrezh Vardanyan. Yerevan: Sovetakan grogh.
- Watkins, Calvert (1995). How to Kill a Dragon: Aspects of Indo-European Poetics. Oxford University Press. ISBN 9780198024712.
