= Phraates III =

Phraates III 𐭐𐭓𐭇𐭕
- Great King; King of Kings; Arsaces
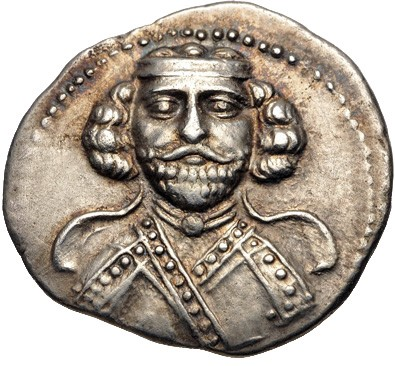
- Phraates III's portrait on the obverse of a coin, showing him with a beard and a diadem on his head. Minted at Ecbatana in c. 62

King of the Parthian Empire
- Reign: 69 – 57 BC
- Predecessor: Sinatruces
- Successor: Mithridates IV
- Died: 57 BC
- Spouse: Piriustana, Teleuniqe
- Issue: Mithridates IV; Orodes II unnamed daughter
- Dynasty: Arsacid dynasty
- Father: Sinatruces
- Religion: Zoroastrianism

Phraates III (also spelled Frahad III; Parthian: 𐭐𐭓𐭇𐭕 Frahāt) or Arsaces XVII, was King of Kings of the Parthian Empire from 69 BC to 57 BC. He was the son and successor of Sinatruces (r. 75–69 BC).

At Phraates III's accession, his empire could no longer be considered the supreme power in the Near East, because of the ascendancy of Armenia under Tigranes the Great (r. 95–55 BC) and Pontus under his ally Mithridates VI Eupator (r. 120–63 BC). Phraates III's reign was thus marked by his efforts to restore his empire to its former position. To the west of his empire, war had engulfed the area. Tigranes and Mithridates VI urged him to join their war against the Roman Republic, while the Romans tried in turn to convince Phraates III to join them. Phraates III seemingly made promises to both parties but remained passive. He awaited the outcome of the war to take advantage of it at the right moment for the Parthians.

In 65 BC, Phraates III and his new son-in-law Tigranes the Younger (who was Tigranes the Elder's son) led an expedition into Armenia. Initially successful, their efforts were halted by a long siege at Artaxata. This led Phraates III to put Tigranes the Younger in charge of the Armenian expedition, reinforcing him with some Parthian soldiers. Tigranes the Younger, however, was ultimately defeated by his father, leading him to desert Phraates III and join the Roman commander Pompey instead. Tigranes the Elder soon submitted to the Romans who kept him as king. They appointed Tigranes the Younger the ruler of Sophene. However, he quickly fell out with Pompey and was sent as a prisoner to Rome. This was contested by Phraates III but to no avail.

Around the same time—in late 65 BC—Phraates III reconquered Adiabene, Gordyene and northern Mesopotamia from Tigranes. However, a Roman attack under the generals Aulus Gabinius and Lucius Afranius as far as the Tigris resulted in Phraates III losing Gordyene, which was restored to Tigranes by the Romans. At the start of 64 BC, while Pompey was focusing on his expedition against Mithridates VI, Phraates III invaded Armenia, and ultimately reached an accord with Pompey and Tigranes; Mesopotamia and Adiabene were confirmed as Parthian territory, while Gordyene was confirmed as Armenian. Furthermore, a peace treaty was concluded between Phraates III and Tigranes.

In c. 57 BC Phraates III was murdered by his two sons, Orodes II and Mithridates IV, with the latter ascending the throne. A civil war between the two brothers soon erupted and Orodes II emerged victorious.

== Name ==
Phraátēs (Φραάτης) is the Greek form of the Parthian Frahāt (𐭐𐭓𐭇𐭕), itself from the Old Iranian *Frahāta- ("gained, earned"). The Modern Persian version is Farhād (فرهاد).

== Background ==
Phraates III was a son of Sinatruces (r. 75–69 BC), who was presumably a son of the Parthian ruler Mithridates I (r. 171–132 BC). The name of the Arsacid branch established by Sinatruces on the Parthian throne has been coined by the modern historian Marek Jan Olbrycht as the "Sinatrucids", which ruled the Parthian Empire from 78/77 BC to 12 AD. After the death of Mithridates II (r. 124–91 BC) the Parthian Empire fell into a state of turmoil and decline; the authority of the crown had declined, while the empire lost lands to its neighbours. The Artaxiad king of Armenia, Tigranes the Great (r. 95–55 BC), took advantage of the Parthians' weakness and retook the "seventy valleys" he had previously ceded to Mithridates II. He also went on to conquer the Parthian colonies of Media Atropatene, Gordyene, Adiabene, Osroene, and northern Mesopotamia. Tigranes had also fought campaigns in other kingdoms, adding Syria, Cilicia and Coele-Syria to his vast kingdom.

== Reign ==
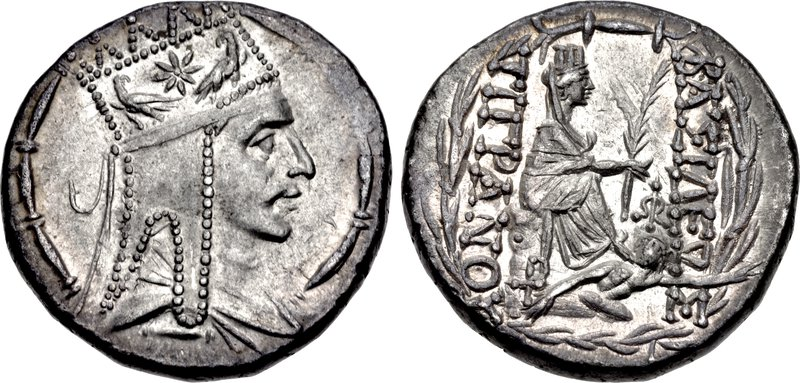
Coin of Tigranes the Great, the Artaxiad king of Armenia (r. 95–55 BC)

When Phraates III came to the throne in 69 BC, he inherited an empire that could no longer be considered the supreme power in the Near East, because of the ascendancy of Armenia under Tigranes and Pontus under the latter's ally Mithridates VI Eupator (r. 120–63 BC). However, this began to change; in the same year, the Roman commander Lucullus pushed Tigranes out of Syria and Cilicia, forcing him to retreat to Armenia, where Mithridates VI took refuge with him. Lucullus then marched towards Armenia, where he was likewise successful, forcing Tigranes and Mithridates VI to withdraw to the northern part of the country. From there they implored Phraates III to aid them in exchange for the lost Parthian lands of Gordyene, Adiabene, and northern Mesopotamia.

This was not the first time the two allies had attempted to persuade the Parthians into an alliance against the Romans. A few years earlier (72 BC), Mithridates VI had asked Phraates III's father Sinatruces to join him; he declined, preferring to remain neutral. At the same time, Phraates III was in correspondence with Lucullus, who proposed an alliance between the two powers, seemingly with the guarantee that he would acknowledge Parthian demands against Tigranes. Although Lucullus had been successful in his war against the two monarchs initially, their forces remained a threat to the Romans and still possessed the strength to repel him. Phraates III seemingly made promises to both parties but remained passive to await the outcome of the war. He could then take advantage of it at the right moment for the Parthians.

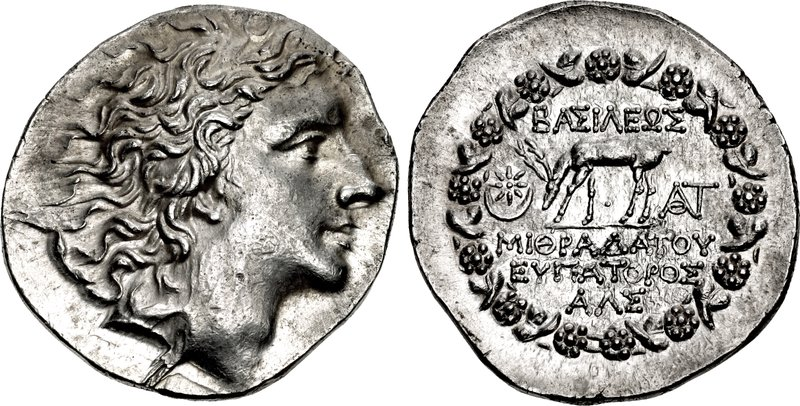
Coin of Mithridates VI Eupator, the king of Pontus (r. 120–63 BC)

In 66 BC, Phraates III entered into negotiations with Lucullus' successor Pompey, who possibly offered Roman acknowledgement of Parthian authority over Mesopotamia, Adiabene, and Gordyene in exchange for military aid. Around the same time, Tigranes' namesake son and heir, Tigranes the Younger, fell out with his father and fled to the court of Phraates III. He agreed to help Phraates III take the Armenian throne in return for marrying his daughter. This marriage, which took place in 66/65 BC, gave Phraates III the opportunity to involve himself in the affairs of Armenia, including preventing Pompey from putting Parthian interests in jeopardy. Phraates III, together with Tigranes the Younger, led an expedition into Armenia. Initially successful, their efforts were halted by a long siege at Artaxata, which led Phraates III to put Tigranes the Younger in charge of the Armenian expedition, reinforcing him with some Parthian soldiers. Ultimately, Tigranes the Younger was defeated by his father, however, leading him to desert Phraates III and join Pompey instead. Tigranes the Elder soon surrendered to Pompey, who chose to allow him to retain his crown. Instead, Tigranes the Younger was made the ruler of Sophene with the assurance that he would ascend to the Armenian throne after his father's death.

However, after a brief reign, Tigranes the Younger was imprisoned and deported to Rome. The reason behind this is disputed. According to Rahim M. Shayegan, it was because he remained an ally of Phraates III, with whom he still conspired with to overthrow Tigranes the Elder, whilst Michał Marciak states it was due to his dispute with Pompey over Sophene's treasury. In the spring of 65 BC, Phraates III protested the arrest of his son-in-law but to no avail. Around the same time—in late 65 BC—Phraates III reconquered Adiabene, Gordyene and northern Mesopotamia. However, a Roman attack under the generals Aulus Gabinius and Lucius Afranius as far as the Tigris resulted in Phraates III losing Gordyene, which was restored to Tigranes by the Romans.

Phraates III protested against the Romans for the second time—again to no avail. After the Roman forces pulled out of Mesopotamia in the winter of 65/4 BC, and Pompey resumed his war against Mithridates VI, Phraates III took advantage of the situation and invaded Armenia at the start of 64 BC. Phraates III ultimately reached an accord with Pompey and Tigranes; Mesopotamia and Adiabene were confirmed as Parthian territory, while Gordyene was confirmed as Armenian. Furthermore, a peace treaty was established between Phraates III and Tigranes.

== Coinage and Imperial ideology ==
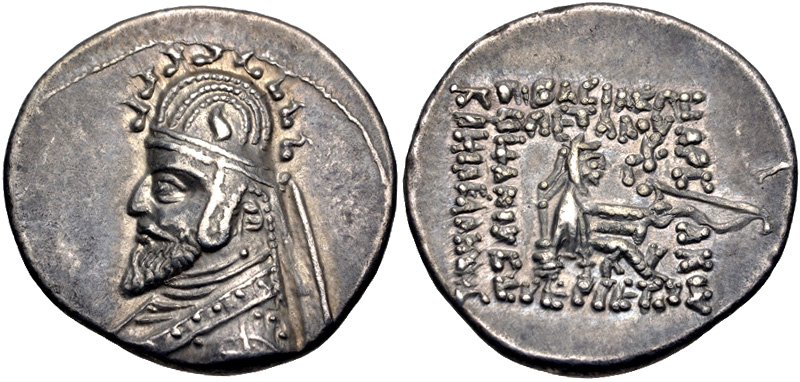
Coin of Phraates III wearing a tiara

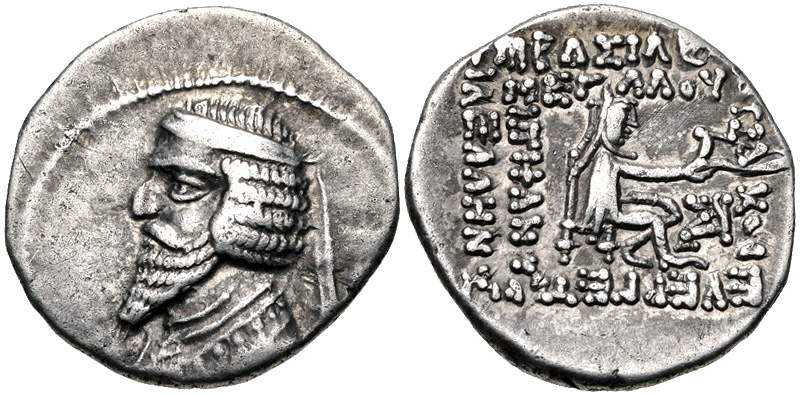
Coin of Phraates III wearing a diadem

Phraates III was the penultimate Parthian king to use the legend of "King, God" in his coinage (the first Parthian to use it being Mithridates I), an uncommon title amongst the Parthian monarchs. The last Parthian ruler to use the title was Mithridates IV. Other titles used by Phraates III were Epiphanes, Theopator and Eupator. According to the modern historian Edward Dąbrowa, these titles were seemingly used by the Parthians as a method to back their claims to the throne, "through their close relation to the divine ancestor, or by their own divine status." Phraates III also used the titles of King of Kings and Great King. (Note: However, the regular usage of the title of King of Kings began once again under Phraates IV (r. 37–2 BC); the last Parthian monarch to use it regularly was Mithridates II (r. 124–91 BC).) Like the rest of the Parthian kings, he used the title of Arsaces—the name of the first Parthian ruler Arsaces I (r. 247 – 217 BC)—on his coinage. This had become a royal honorific among the Parthian monarchs out of their admiration for his achievements.

On the obverse of his coins, Phraates III used two types of headgear; a tiara decorated with a line of stags, (Note: Phraates III's father and predecessor, Sinatruces, also portrayed himself with the same tiara on his coinage.) and a unique diadem inspired by the Hellenistic diadem. After his death, the tiara does not appear on Parthian coinage for some time. The coinage of Phraates III influenced the Parthian vassal kingdom of Persis; its king, Pakor I, adopted the same hairstyle used on the obverse of Phraates III's coins.

On the reverse of Phraates III's tetradrachms, an altered version of the traditional seated archer-figure is depicted; instead of a sleeved coat, he is now wearing the same open-necked tunic worn by Phraates III on the obverse of his coins. According to the modern historian Vesta Sarkhosh Curtis, "The archer on the reverse is now clearly the same person as the king on the obverse." A bird similar to the eagle of the Greek god Zeus has also been added on the hand of the seated figure. In the Parthian era, Iranians used Hellenistic iconography to portray their divine figures, thus the eagle can be associated with the Avestan Verethragna, the royal falcon.

== Death and succession ==
In c. 57 BC, Phraates III was murdered by his two sons, Orodes II and Mithridates IV. Orodes II at first supported his elder brother Mithridates IV, but eventually decided to revolt. With the support of the Suren clan, Orodes II defeated his brother and established himself as the sole ruler of the Parthian Empire in 55 BC.

== Legacy ==
Phraates III was the first Parthian monarch who vigorously attempted to restore the Parthian realm to its former international position after the death of Mithridates II in 91 BC—an attempt that would take up much of his reign. He was partially successful in his efforts to regain lost land, such as northern Mesopotamia and Adiabene. He was unsuccessful in his ambitions towards Armenia, which would be continued by his son Orodes II after the death of Tigranes and the succession of the latter's son Artavasdes II in 55 BC.

== Family ==
=== Marriages ===
Phraates III's wives are all known from records on Babylonian tablets:

- Piriustana
- Teleuniqe

=== Issue ===
- Mithridates IV, eldest son and Parthian king from 57 to 54 BC.
- Orodes II, Parthian king from 57 to 37 BC.
- Unnamed daughter, married Tigranes the Great's son, Tigranes the Younger.

== Sources ==
- Boyce, Mary (1984). Zoroastrians: Their Religious Beliefs and Practices. Psychology Press. pp. 1–252. ISBN 9780415239028.
- Curtis, Vesta Sarkhosh (2007). "Religious iconography on ancient Iranian coins". Journal of Late Antiquity. London: 413–434.
- Curtis, Vesta Sarkhosh (2012). "Parthian coins: Kingship and Divine Glory". The Parthian Empire and its Religions. Computus Druck Satz & Verlag. pp. 67–83. ISBN 9783940598134.
- Dąbrowa, Edward (2007). "The Parthian Kingship". History of the Ancient Near East / Monographs. XI: 123–134.
- Dąbrowa, Edward (2010). "Arsakes Epiphanes. Were the Arsacids Deities 'Revealed'?". Studi Ellenistici. XXIV: 223–231.
- Dąbrowa, Edward (2012). "The Arsacid Empire". In Daryaee, Touraj (ed.). The Oxford Handbook of Iranian History. Oxford University Press. pp. 1–432. ISBN 978-0-19-987575-7.
- Dąbrowa, Edward (2013). "The Parthian Aristocracy: its Social Position and Political Activity". Parthica. 15: 53–62.
- Dąbrowa, Edward (2018). "Arsacid Dynastic Marriages". Electrum. 25: 73–83. doi:10.4467/20800909EL.18.005.8925.
- Garsoian, Nina (2005). "Tigran II". Encyclopaedia Iranica.
- Kia, Mehrdad (2016). The Persian Empire: A Historical Encyclopedia [2 volumes]. ABC-CLIO. ISBN 978-1610693912.
- Marciak, Michał (2017). Sophene, Gordyene, and Adiabene: Three Regna Minora of Northern Mesopotamia Between East and West. BRILL. ISBN 9789004350724.
- Olbrycht, Marek Jan (1997). "Parthian King's tiara - Numismatic evidence and some aspects of Arsacid political ideology". Notae Numismaticae. 2: 27–61.
- Olbrycht, Marek Jan (2015). "Arsacid Iran and the nomads of Central Asia – Ways of cultural transfer". Complexity of Interaction along the Eurasian Steppe Zone in the First Millenium CE. Bonn Contributions to Asian Archaeology. Vol. 7. Bonn. pp. 333–390.
- Olbrycht, Marek Jan (2016). "Dynastic Connections in the Arsacid Empire and the Origins of the House of Sāsān". In Curtis, Vesta Sarkhosh; Pendleton, Elizabeth J.; Alram, Michael; Daryaee, Touraj (eds.). The Parthian and Early Sasanian Empires: Adaptation and Expansion. Oxbow Books. ISBN 9781785702082.
- Rezakhani, Khodadad (2013). "Arsacid, Elymaean, and Persid Coinage". In Potts, Daniel T. (ed.). The Oxford Handbook of Ancient Iran. Oxford University Press. ISBN 978-0199733309.
- Schmitt, Rüdiger (2005). "Personal Names, Iranian iv. Parthian Period". Encyclopaedia Iranica.
- Shayegan, M. Rahim (2011). Arsacids and Sasanians: Political Ideology in Post-Hellenistic and Late Antique Persia. Cambridge University Press. pp. 1–539. ISBN 9780521766418.

Phraates III Arsacid dynasty Died: 57 BC
Preceded by Sinatruces	King of the Parthian Empire; 69–57 BC	Succeeded by Mithridates IV
