= Arkathias =

2nd century BC King of Sophene

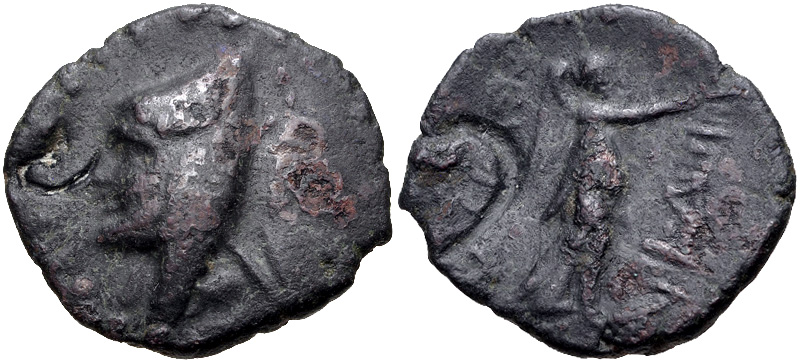
Coin of Arkathias, possible Carcathiocerta mint

Arkathias was the Orontid king of Sophene in the second half of the 2nd-century BC. His name (Ἀρκαθίας) is of Iranian origin, although its etymology remains uncertain. The Polish historian Michał Marciak suggests that Arkathias was the founder of the royal city of Carcathiocerta. Present scholarship maintain that Arkathias ruled after Mithrobouzanes and before Artanes, however, this is subject to further confirmation.

== Sources ==
- Marciak, Michał (2017). Sophene, Gordyene, and Adiabene: Three Regna Minora of Northern Mesopotamia Between East and West. BRILL. ISBN 978-9004350700.
