= Teghut =

Teghut may refer to:

- Teghut, Lori, Lori Province, Armenia
- Teghut, Tavush, Tavush Province, Armenia
- Teghut Mine, Lori Province, Armenia
