= Zariadres =

King of Sophene from 190 to 188 BC

Strategos of Sophene
- Reign: c. 200-190

Basileus of Sophene
- Reign: c. 190BC-163 BC
- Predecessor: Xerxes
- Successor: Mithrobouzanes
- Issue: Mithrobouzanes; Artaxias I (possibly)
- Dynasty: Orontid

Zariadres was an Orontid ruler of Sophene in the early 2nd century BC. According to Strabo, he was a general of the Seleucid ruler Antiochus III who was made ruler of Sophene, although most scholars believe that he was a member of the Orontid dynasty, which ruled Armenia and Sophene. After the Seleucids were defeated by the Romans in 190 BC, Zariadres and his ally Artaxias I of Greater Armenia (possibly also Zariadres' son) revolted against the Seleucids, became independent kings and expanded their territories. The last information about Zariadres' reign dates to 188 BC. He was succeeded as king by Mithrobouzanes, possibly his son.

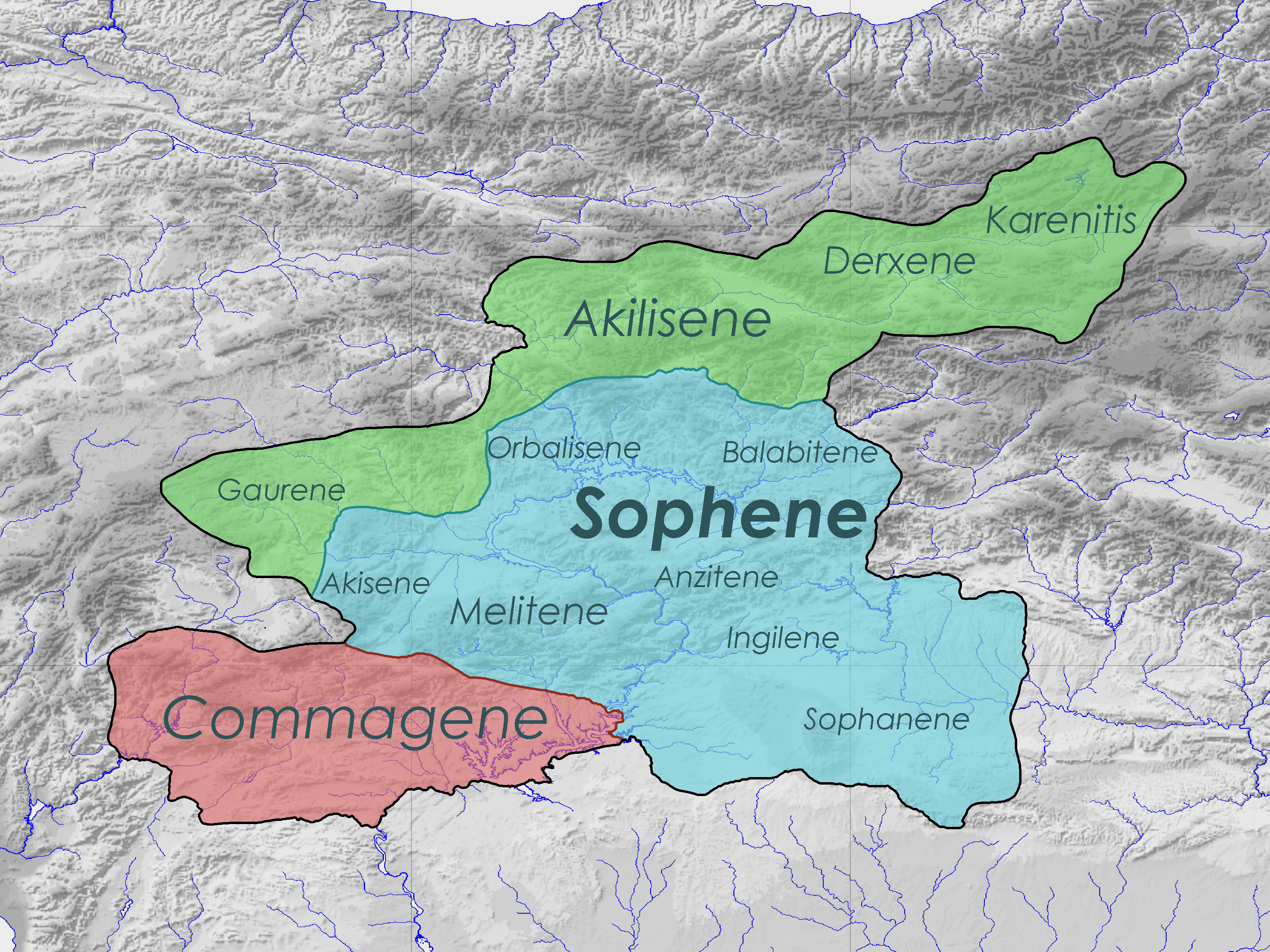
Sophene at Zariadres' independence (c. 190 BC) Territories conquered during the reign of Zariadres (c. 190–163 BC) Commagene, formerly a part of Sophene, detached prior to the Roman–Seleucid War

== Name ==
Zariadres (Ζαριάδρης) is the Greek rendering of an Iranian name, attested as zrytr/zryhr in the Aramaic inscriptions of Artaxias I in Sevan and Siwnik, and as Zareh in Armenian sources. The name derives from Old Iranian *Zari āθra ('with golden fire').

== Biography ==
Strabo writes that Sophene was taken over by a "general [strategos]" of King Antiochus III (r. 222–187 BC) called Zariadres. Simultaneously, Artaxias I took over Greater Armenia. According to David Marshall Lang, this event occurred in 200 BC. Most scholars believe that Zariadres was a member of the Orontid dynasty, which ruled Armenia and Sophene. The preceding Orontid ruler of Sophene, Xerxes, was poisoned on Antiochus III's orders in approximately 212 BC, or later, in 202/201 BC. Different views exist on the question of whether the Zareh mentioned in Artaxias I's Aramaic inscriptions is identical with the Zariadres who became ruler of Sophene according to Strabo. Michał Marciak argues that identifying Zariadres of Sophene with the Zareh of the inscriptions seems to be "the most straightforward interpretation." Marciak further notes that if the two figures are not to be identified, then there is no evidence that Zariadres was a member of the Orontid dynasty. He concludes that Zariadres belonged to a different branch of the Orontid dynasty than the preceding kings of Sophene.

Coin attributed to Zariadres by Y. T. Nercessian, described as a fantasy piece by Frank L. Kovacs, who argues no authentic example exists.

Following the defeat of Antiochus III by the Romans at the Battle of Magnesia in 190 BC, Zariadres and Artaxias revolted and with Roman consent began to reign as kings under the terms of the Treaty of Apamea in 188 BC—Zariadres over Sophene and Artaxias over Greater Armenia. Zariadres and Artaxias then expanded their kingdoms. Zariadres conquered Acilisene and possibly also Xerxene (likely a scribal corruption of *Derzene, corresponding to Armenian Derjan) and Karenitis (around modern-day Erzurum) in succession․ Another territory mentioned by Strabo, read as either Taronitis (i.e., Taron) or Tamonitis (either Tman or Tmorik), was conquered either by Zariadres or Artaxias. (Note: If the reading Tamonitis and its identification with Tmorik are correct, then a conquest by Artaxias is more likely, as this territory was located further east.) Zariadres may have later recognized the suzerainty of Antiochus IV Epiphanes in order to be allowed to remain as king of Sophene, rechristening the royal city of Arcathiocerta as Epiphaneia in the Seleucid king's honor.

He was succeeded by Mithrobouzanes, who may have been his son. Zariadres appears to have sent Mithrobouzanes to the court of Ariarathes IV of Cappadocia, which suggests the existence of an alliance between the two kings.

According to Diodorus 31.21-2, shortly after Ariarathes V Philopator came to power, he resolved a succession crisis in Sophene by installing Mithrobouzanes as king (c. 163 BC), rebuffing an attempt by Artaxias I to partition Sophene. However, due to the fragmentary nature of Diodorus 31, it cannot be ruled out that the chapters are not in their original order, and thus, the "Ariarathes, surnamed Philopator" of 31.21 may not be the same as the "Ariarathes" of 31.22. If the chapters are indeed disordered, there is no means to date the end of Zariadres' reign and the ascension of Mithrobouzanes with any precision.
