= Tigranes the Younger =

Artaxiad prince who briefly ruled the Kingdom of Sophene in 65 BC

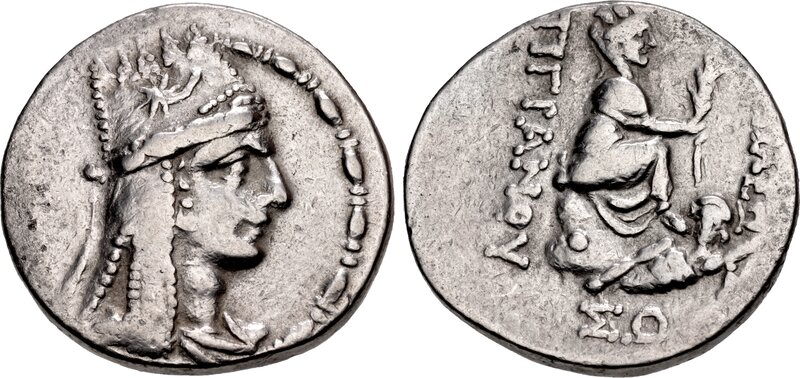
- Coin of Tigranes the Younger

King of Sophene
- Reign: 65 BC
- Predecessor: Tigranes the Great (Kingdom of Armenia)
- Successor: Tigranes the Great (Kingdom of Armenia)
- Died: after 65 BC
- Spouse: Daughter of Phraates III
- Dynasty: Artaxiad
- Father: Tigranes the Great
- Mother: Cleopatra of Pontus
- Religion: Zoroastrianism

Tigranes the Younger was an Artaxiad prince, who briefly ruled the Kingdom of Sophene in 65 BC.

== Biography ==
Tigranes the Younger was the son and heir of the Artaxiad king of Armenia, Tigranes the Elder (r. 95–55 BC). His mother was Cleopatra of Pontus, a daughter of Mithridates VI Eupator (r. 120–63 BC), the king of Pontus. In c. 66 BC, Tigranes the Younger fell out with his father and fled to the court of the Parthian monarch Phraates III (r. 69–57 BC). He agreed to help Phraates III take the Armenian throne in return for marrying his daughter. This marriage, which took place in 66/65 BC, gave Phraates III the opportunity to involve himself in the affairs of Armenia, including preventing the Roman commander Pompey from putting Parthian interests in jeopardy. Phraates III, together with Tigranes the Younger, led an expedition into Armenia. Initially successful, their efforts were halted by a long siege at Artaxata, which led Phraates III to put Tigranes the Younger in charge of the expedition, leaving him with some Parthian soldiers. Ultimately, Tigranes the Younger was defeated by his father, however, leading him to join Pompey instead. Tigranes the Elder soon surrendered to Pompey, who chose to allow him to retain his crown. Instead, Tigranes the Younger was made the ruler of Sophene with the assurance that he would ascend to the Armenian throne after his father's death.

However, after a brief reign Tigranes the Younger was imprisoned and deported to Rome. The reason behind this is disputed. According to M. Rahim Shayegan, it was because he remained an ally of Phraates III, with whom he still conspired with to overthrow Tigranes the Elder, whilst Michał Marciak states it was due to his dispute with Pompey over Sophene's treasury. In the spring of 65 BC, Phraates III protested the arrest of his son-in-law but to no avail.

== Sources ==
- Dąbrowa, Edward (2018). "Arsacid Dynastic Marriages". Electrum. 25: 73–83. doi:10.4467/20800909EL.18.005.8925.
- Marciak, Michał (2017). Sophene, Gordyene, and Adiabene: Three Regna Minora of Northern Mesopotamia Between East and West. BRILL. ISBN 9789004350724.
- Shayegan, M. Rahim (2011). Arsacids and Sasanians: Political Ideology in Post-Hellenistic and Late Antique Persia. Cambridge University Press. pp. 1–539. ISBN 9780521766418.
- Toumanoff, Cyrille (1990). Les dynasties de la Caucasie Chrétienne: de l'Antiquité jusqu'au XIXe siècle : tables généalogiques et chronologiques. Roma.

Regnal titles
Preceded by Tigranes the Great (Kingdom of Armenia)	King of Sophene; 65 BC	Succeeded by Tigranes the Great (Kingdom of Armenia)
