= Kingdom of Sophene =

Ancient kingdom between Armenia and Syria, ruled by Iranians

- 3rd century BC–95 BC
- Map of Sophene as a vassal state of the Kingdom of Armenia
- Capital: Karkathiokerta; Arsamosata; 38°40′30″N 39°10′15″E
- Common languages: Imperial Aramaic (government, court); Armenian (lingua franca)
- Religion: Zoroastrianism
- Government: Monarchy
- King
  - c. 260 BC: Sames I
  - c. 95 BC: Artanes
- Historical era: Hellenistic Age
  - Established: 3rd century BC
  - Conquered by Tigranes the Great: 95 BC
Preceded by	Succeeded by
Satrapy of Armenia	Kingdom of Armenia (Antiquity); Kingdom of Commagene

The Kingdom of Sophene (Armenian: Ծոփք, romanized: Tsop’k’, Ancient Greek: Σωφηνή, romanized: Sōphēnḗ) was a Hellenistic-era political entity situated between ancient Armenia and Syria. Its territory was once a part of the Satrapy of Armenia, which was ruled by the Orontid dynasty, and it emerged as a separate kingdom in the 3rd century BCE under a branch of that dynasty. The kingdom maintained independence until c. 95 BCE when the Artaxiad king Tigranes the Great conquered the territories as part of his empire. The kingdom was culturally mixed with Greek, Armenian, Iranian, Syrian, Anatolian and Roman influences.

== Name ==
The name Sophene is thought to derive from the ethnonym Ṣuppani, a people who lived in the region in the first half of the 1st millennium BCE and appear in Hittite (as Isuwa) and Assyrian sources. According to historian Nicholas Adontz, the Ancient Greek Sōphēnḗ was coined after the Armenian Tsop’k’, which stems directly from Ṣuppani.

== History ==
=== Origin and early history ===
The Kingdom of Sophene was ruled by the Orontids, a dynasty of Iranian origin which ruled the Satrapy of Armenia under the Achaemenid Empire. They were descended from Orontes I, a Bactrian nobleman who was the son-in-law of the Achaemenid King of Kings Artaxerxes II (r. 404–358 BCE). The Orontids maintained their control over Armenia following the conquest of the Achaemenid Empire by Alexander the Great in 330 BCE, effectively ruling Armenia as kings. Most scholars concur that Sophene formed part of the Satrapy of Armenia in the Achaemenid period. In the Hellenistic period, the western regions of Armenia may have been more under the control of the Seleucids while the Orontids maintained control over the eastern regions of Armenia. The intervention of Orontes III of Armenia in the conflict between the Seleucids and Ariarathes II in Cappadocia c. 261 BCE indicates that, by this time at least, the Orontids ruled both Greater Armenia and Sophene.

According to the Geographica of the Greek writer Strabo (died 24 CE), Sophene first emerged as a distinct kingdom under Zariadres (fl. 190 BCE), who was installed as its ruler by the Seleucid king Antiochus III the Great (r. 222–187 BCE). However, evidence from epigraphic, numismatic, and literary sources suggests an earlier date for the appearance of the Kingdom of Sophene. Most likely, Sophene emerged as a distinct kingdom (perhaps spanning from Commagene to Arzanene) in the mid-3rd century BCE, during the gradual decline of Seleucid influence in the Near East and the split of the Orontid dynasty into several branches.

According to historian Michał Marciak, Xerxes is the first ruler of Sophene whose reign is unambiguously attested in ancient sources, but it is likely that he was preceded by two rulers: Samos (or Sames) and Arsames. Samos is credited with the foundation of the city of Samosata sometime before 245 BCE. Historian Margherita Facella identifies Arsames with the Armenian ruler who in 227 BCE allied with Antiochus Hierax, the younger brother and rival of Seleucus II Callinicus (r. 246–225 BCE). Arsamosata, a royal capital of Sophene, and two cities called Arsameia (one on the Euphrates and one on the Nymphaios) in Commagene were probably named after Arsames. During the reign of Xerxes, in about 212 BCE, Sophene was attacked by Antiochus III, (Note: This information comes from a fragmentary account of the Greek author Polybius (8.23). Some scholars (see Marciak 2017, p. 117, note 5) believe that the Antiochus mentioned by Polybius as attacking Xerxes was Antiochus IV Epiphanes r. 175 – 164 BCE. But Facella writes that it was Antiochus III, and Marciak states that this is the more likely version.) reportedly over Xerxes's lack of loyalty and the unpaid tribute of his father. Xerxes surrendered and was given Antiochus's sister Antiochis as a wife. According to the later history of John of Antioch, Xerxes was eventually poisoned by his wife on the orders of Antiochus III.

=== Zariadres and his successors ===
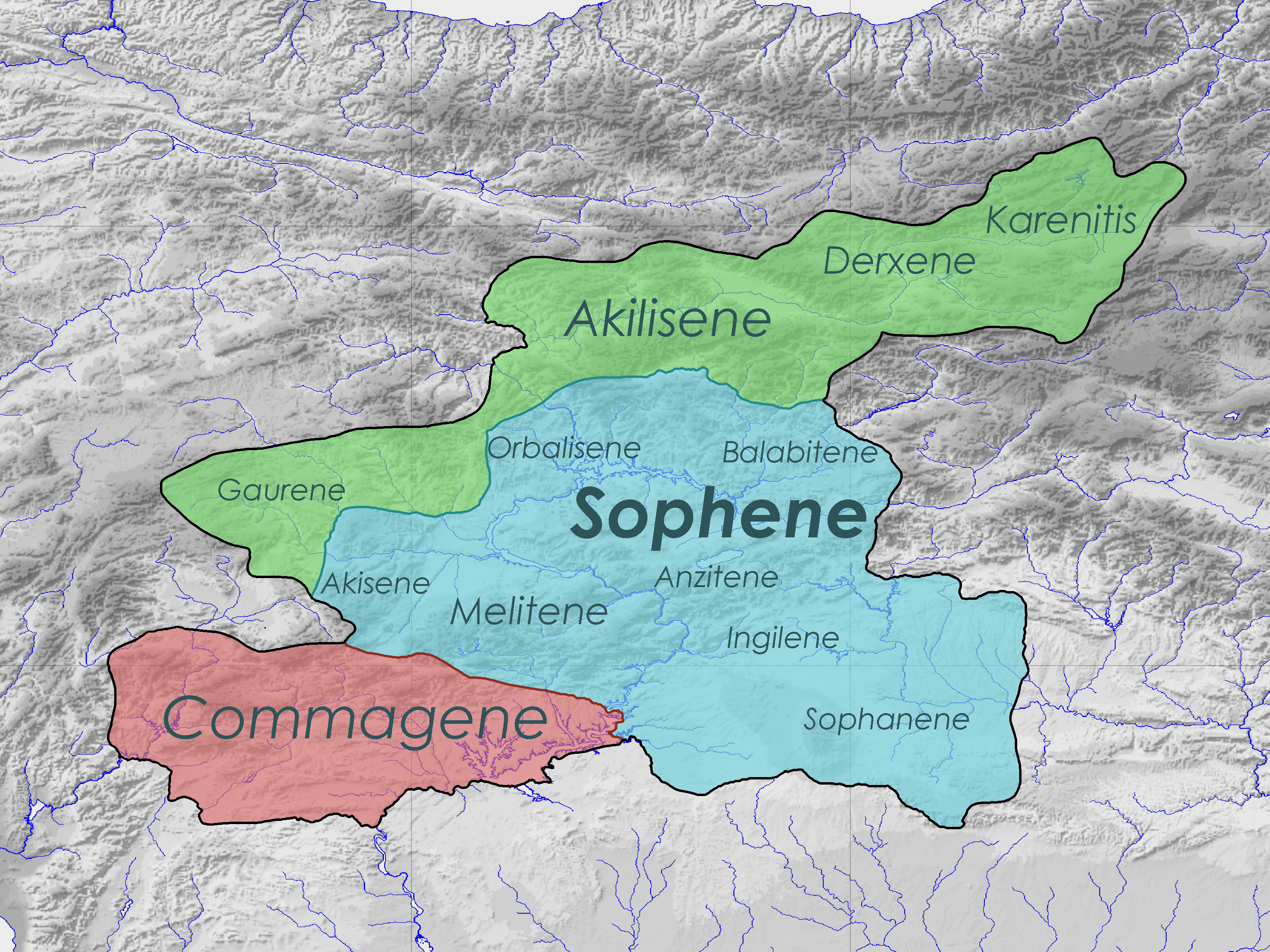
Sophene at Zariadres' independence (c. 190 BC) Territories conquered during the reign of Zariadres (c. 190–163 BC) Commagene, possibly a part of Sophene that was detached after the Roman–Seleucid War

After Xerxes, Sophene was ruled by Zariadres, who, according to Strabo, was a general and appointee of Antiochus III. Most scholars agree that Zariadres must have been of Orontid descent; according to Marciak, he belonged to a different branch of the Orontid dynasty than the previous kings of Sophene. At the same time, Greater Armenia came under the control of Artaxias I, who may have been Zariadres's son or his close relative. (Note: Scholars have expressed differing views on whether Zariadres, ruler of Sophene, should be identified with the zrytr or zryhr whom Artaxias I names as his father in his Aramaic-language inscriptions. According to Marciak, identifying Zariadres with the father of Artaxias mentioned in the inscriptions seems to be "the most straightforward interpretation". Facella writes that it is uncertain whether Zariadres should be identified with Artaxias I's father and that, if this is the case, then Zariadres "might also have claimed a kinship with the Orontid house".) After Antiochus III's defeat by the Romans in 190, Zariadres took the royal title and became entirely independent from the Seleucids, as did Artaxias in Greater Armenia. In the Peace of Apamea of 188 BCE between Rome and Antiochus III, the Seleucid ruler relinquished the territories north and west of the Taurus Mountains (i.e. Sophene and Greater Armenia). This left Commagene, which may have been part of the Kingdom of Sophene, under Seleucid control. Later in the 2nd century BCE, a separate kingdom of Commagene ruled by an Orontid line emerged.

After gaining their independence from the Seleucids, Zariadres and Artaxias allied with each other to expand their dominions. The territories they conquered are listed by Strabo, but the identification of many of the toponyms is uncertain. Zariadres conquered Acilisene to the north, the otherwise unknown Akisene to the west (possibly a corruption of Anzitene/Handzit), as well as "certain other countries", probably territories to the east of the original kingdom of Sophene. Another territory mentioned by Strabo, read as either Taronitis (i.e. Taron) or Tamonitis (either Tman or Tmorik), was conquered either by Zariadres or Artaxias. (Note: If the reading Tamonitis and its identification with Tmorik are correct, then a conquest by Artaxias is more likely, as this territory was located further east.) It is likely that some of these conquests included territories south of the Taurus, going against the territorial stipulation of the Peace of Apamea. According to several antique authors, the Seleucid king Antiochus IV Epiphanes (r. 175 – 164 BCE) fought with Artaxias I in 165 BCE and took him prisoner (he was subsequently released and returned to the Armenian throne), but nothing is said about Sophene's status during this conflict. Zariadres may have recognized Antiochus's supremacy, thus remaining on the throne of Sophene.

Following the death of Zariadres, Artaxias I apparently claimed the right to rule over Sophene based on his succession rights (primogeniture). However, the younger line in Sophene managed to preserve the independence of their kingdom, due to their diplomatic (and possibly dynastic) link with Cappadocia. Three successors of Zariadres are known: Mithrobouzanes, Arkathias, and Arsakes (or Artanes). Arkathias is known only through numismatic evidence and his dating to the second half of the 2nd century BCE is tentative. He is believed to have been the founder of Carcathiocerta, the second royal capital of Sophene, which is identified with modern-day Eğil on the Tigris River. Based on this connection with Arkathias, Carcathiocerta (as it is called by Strabo) is emended to *Arkathiokerta. However, Arsamosata, located further to the north, remained the largest settlement and only true city of the kingdom. Arsamosata survived in a contracted state until perhaps the early 13th century CE.

Sophene was autonomous for the majority of the 2nd century BCE. Change first occurred with the arrival of the Parthian Empire, which under the King of Kings Mithridates II (r. 124–91 BCE) forced Sophene to recognize its suzerainty. In about 95 BCE, Sophene was conquered by the King of Greater Armenia, Tigranes II the Great, who deposed Arsakes, the king of Sophene. However, Tigranes lost control over Sophene c. 69 BCE during his war with Rome. After Tigranes II was defeated by the Romans, Pompey installed Tigranes's son Tigranes the Younger as ruler of Sophene, then ceded the kingdom to Ariobarzanes I of Cappadocia. It is debated whether after 66 BCE Sophene came back under Greater Armenian control or became a part of Cappadocia. Around 54 CE, the Romans installed Sohaemus of Emesa as King of Sophene. After this, Sophene reverted to Armenian control and was ruled as an Armenian province. Branches of the Orontid dynasty continued to rule parts of Sophene after it was annexed by Greater Armenia.

== Religion and culture ==
The Orontid dynasty in Sophene practiced Zoroastrianism. According to modern historian Michał Marciak, the well-attested existence of Iranian culture in Sophene could be understood, as it was by Nina Garsoïan, as a derivation of Greater Armenia and indirectly from Iran. He also considers it possible that the strong existence of Iranian culture might have influenced Roman and Greek writers to regard the region as Armenian. The Orontids of Sophene "engaged or reinvigorated certain regional traditions of their Persian satrapal ancestors to give their fledgling kingdom the perception of depth." Furthermore, with the names of the royal members of the family including the names of their newfound cities, the Orontids emphasized their Achaemenid and Orontid royal dynastic aspirations, and also their Iranian cultural background. This included names such as Xerxes and Arsames, common amongst the Achaemenid dynasty and the Persian elite. The name of "Sames" is possibly derived from the Avestan name Sāma, the father of the Avestan hero Garshasp, which would indicate some sort of custom of Iranian religious or epic lore amongst the Orontids.

Iranian cults were popular in Sophene amongst the nobility, who gave themselves theophoric Iranian names, and the peasantry, who sacrificed horses in the name of the goddess Anahita. Anahita was highly popular in the country, with animals such as cows and horses being regularly sacrificed in her name. The coins minted in Sophene depicted several figures, such as Herakles, winged thunderbolts and eagles. The iconography of Herakles may have been used as a representation of the Zoroastrian gods Verethragna or Ahura Mazda, similar to the Parthian Empire.

The Kingdom of Sophene is described in several sources as an Armenian kingdom or state, and Sophene has long been seen as an "integral part of the Armenian world" in scholarship. Some Greek and Roman geographers viewed the region as a distinctive part of Greater Armenia. Per Everett L. Wheeler, "ancient sources often distinguished the people of Sophene from the Armenians of Armenia Maior." For example, in the legend recorded by Strabo about the foundation of Armenia by the argonaut Armenus, the followers of Armenus seize Acilsene from the "Sopheni", suggesting a Greek belief in the separate origin of the people of Sophene. According to Marciak, there is plentiful evidence of Armenian influence in Sophene, but, "remarkably, evidence of Armenian culture in the archaeological record is […] minimal." T. A. Sinclair discusses Sophene's archaeological landscape together with that of Armenia and states that the material culture of Armenia was Hellenistic. Hellenistic culture had a powerful presence in Sophene, especially in the economic sphere. Archaeological digs have yielded a significant number of common objects of Hellenistic origin. As in other parts of the Near East during the Hellenistic age, Greek names, language, and writing became fashionable in Sophene. Wheeler argues that Sophene was more frequently a part of Mesopotamia than of Armenia in geographical, political, and cultural terms and emphasizes its role as a Hellenistic polity. Marciak argues that Sophene was neither mainly Armenian nor mainly Syrian-Mesopotamian but rather occupied a place in between Greater Armenia and Mesopotamia in terms of its geographical and cultural associations.

Sophene's population in antiquity was diverse, including both Armenians and Syrians. Strabo indicates that the conquests of Zariadres and Artaxias in the 2nd century BC caused the population of Sophene and Greater Armenia to "speak the same language", i.e. Armenian. The 6th-century author John of Ephesus attests to the presence in Sophene of a people called Urta who spoke neither Armenian nor Aramaic. (Note: Joseph Markwart thought that this group was a remnant of the Urartians, but according to Marciak this is "very unclear".) Marciak writes that there is evidence, especially in local toponyms, of a pre-Hellenistic, Anatolian cultural element in Sophene and that the population of the area in Hellenistic and Roman times could have been, "to some extent", a continuation of the pre-Hellenistic element. (Note: According to Igor M. Diakonoff, the Upper Euphrates valley, where Sophene was located, was inhabited by a "mixed Proto-Armenian-Luwian-Hurrian population" in the 8th century BCE, which by that time was already speaking Proto-Armenian as a second or possibly main language.) Against the view that the population of Sophene was ethnically Armenian, Marciak cites Plutarch's report that the population of Sophene reacted positively to the arrival of the Romans who were campaigning against Tigranes II in 69 BCE.

== Architecture ==
The Orontids founded cities such as Samosata and Arsamosata. They were named the "joy of" or "happiness of" their founders, which was an Orontid (and later Artaxiad) practice that recalled the Achaemenid royal discourse. Although the settlements founded by the Orontids demonstrate their Persian cultural and dynastic connection, they did not reuse Achaemenid or Seleucid sites.

The royal tombs erected by the Orontids played a role in the evolution of several Middle Iranian traditions. They created them in the style of a rock-cut tomb, thus greatly stressing their Persian royal connection, as well as recalling the stories of the Achaemenid necropolis near Persepolis.

== Coinage ==
Similar to the early Arsacids of Parthia and Frataraka of Persis, the Orontids of Sophene experimented with images of Iranian royal power. On his coins, Sames I (fl. 260 BCE) is shown as clean-shaven and wearing the kyrbasia, a type of headgear originally worn by the satraps of the Achaemenid Empire. The tip of Sames's kyrbasia is more prominent, similar to that of the headgear worn by the early Ariarathids of Cappadocia. On the coins of Xerxes (fl. 220 BCE), he is shown bearded and wearing a diademed kyrbasia, which represented a new imagery of Iranian royal power.

== Language ==
Armenian was the common language spoken by the people of Sophene. However, as late as the first half of the 2nd century BCE, Imperial Aramaic (with a fairly strong admixture of Persian terms), was used in governmental and court proceedings, which was rooted in Achaemenid practices from Armenia.

== Kings of Sophene ==
- Sames I (c. 260 BCE)
- Arsames I (c. 240 BCE)
- Xerxes (c. 220 BCE)
- Zariadres (c. 190 BCE)
- Mithrobouzanes (c. 188–163 BCE)
- Arkathias (second half of the 2nd century BCE)
- Artanes (or Arsakes) (reign ended c. 95 BCE)
- Tigranes the Younger 65 BCE
