= Mithridates IV of Parthia =

Parthian king from to 57 to 54 BC

Mithridates IV 𐭌𐭄𐭓𐭃𐭕
- Great King, King of Kings, Arsaces
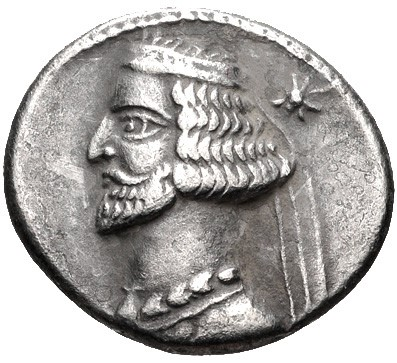
- Coin of Mithridates IV

King of the Parthian Empire
- Reign: 57 – 54 BC
- Predecessor: Phraates III
- Successor: Orodes II
- Died: 54 BC
- Dynasty: Arsacid dynasty
- Father: Phraates III
- Religion: Zoroastrianism

Mithridates IV (also spelled Mithradates IV; Parthian: 𐭌𐭄𐭓𐭃𐭕 Mihrdāt) was a Parthian king from to 57 to 54 BC. He was the son and successor of Phraates III (r. 69–57 BC). Mithridates IV's reign was marked by a dynastic struggle with his younger brother, Orodes II, who eventually emerged victorious and had Mithridates IV executed, thus succeeding him.

== Etymology ==
Mithridates is the Greek attestation of the Iranian name Mihrdāt, meaning "given by Mithra", the name of the ancient Iranian sun god. The name itself is derived from Old Iranian Miθra-dāta-.

== Biography ==
Mithridates IV was a son of Phraates III (r. 69–57 BC), under whom he served as the ruler of the central province of Media. In 57 BC, Mithridates murdered his father with the assistance of his younger brother Orodes. However, the two brothers quickly fell out, and Orodes revolted with the support of the Suren clan. They both assumed the title of King of Kings to demonstrate their claims of superiority over each other. (Note: Besides the title of King of Kings, Mithridates IV also used the titles of Arsaces and Great King.)

This changed the meaning of the title; originally being used as a symbol of political dominance over other realms, the title became known as a symbol of power and legitimacy for contenders in a royal family. Mithridates IV was forced to flee from Parthia to Roman Syria. He took refuge with Aulus Gabinius, the Roman proconsul and governor of Syria. Mithridates IV then returned to invade Parthia with Gabinius in support. The Roman proconsul marched with Mithridates IV to the Euphrates, but turned back to restore another ruler, Ptolemy XII Auletes of Egypt, to his throne. Despite losing his Roman support, Mithridates IV advanced into Mesopotamia and managed to conquer Babylonia. He ousted Orodes and briefly restored his reign as king in 55 BC, minting coins in Seleucia until 54 BC.

However, king Mithridates IV was besieged by Orodes' general, Surena, in Seleucia, and after a prolonged resistance, offered battle to Orodes' forces and was defeated. Mithridates IV was afterwards executed in 54 BC by Orodes.

== Sources ==
- Bivar, A.D.H. (1968). "The Political History of Iran Under the Arsacids". In Fischer, William B. (ed.). The Cambridge History of Iran. Vol. 3a. Cambridge: Cambridge University Press. pp. 21–99. ISBN 0-521-06935-1..
- Dąbrowa, Edward (2012). "The Arsacid Empire". In Daryaee, Touraj (ed.). The Oxford Handbook of Iranian History. Oxford University Press. pp. 1–432. ISBN 978-0-19-987575-7. Archived from the original on 2019-01-01.
- Kia, Mehrdad (2016). The Persian Empire: A Historical Encyclopedia [2 volumes]. ABC-CLIO. ISBN 978-1610693912.
- Mayor, Adrienne (2009). The Poison King: The Life and Legend of Mithradates, Rome's Deadliest Enemy. Princeton University Press. pp. 1–448. ISBN 9780691150260.
- Olbrycht, Marek Jan (2016). "Dynastic Connections in the Arsacid Empire and the Origins of the House of Sāsān". In Curtis, Vesta Sarkhosh; Pendleton, Elizabeth J.; Alram, Michael; Daryaee, Touraj (eds.). The Parthian and Early Sasanian Empires: Adaptation and Expansion. Oxbow Books. ISBN 9781785702082.
- Olbrycht, Marek (2021). "Orodes II". In Yarshater, Ehsan (ed.). Encyclopædia Iranica (Online ed.). Encyclopædia Iranica Foundation.
- Schmitt, Rüdiger (2005). "Personal Names, Iranian iv. Parthian Period". Encyclopaedia Iranica.
- Shayegan, M. Rahim (2011). Arsacids and Sasanians: Political Ideology in Post-Hellenistic and Late Antique Persia. Cambridge University Press. pp. 1–539. ISBN 9780521766418.

Mithridates IV of Parthia Arsacid dynasty Died: 54 BC
Preceded by Phraates III	King of the Parthian Empire; 57–54 BC	Succeeded by Orodes II
