= Mithrobouzanes of Sophene =

2nd-century BC King of Sophene

Mithrobouzanes was the Orontid king of Sophene in the second half of the 2nd-century BC. His name (Μιθροβουζάνης) is the Greek transliteration of the Iranian name *MiΘra-bauǰ-ana-, meaning "Delighting Mithra." The Armenian equivalent to the name would be Me(h)ruzhan (Մեհրուժան). He was the son and successor of Zariadres.

== Reign ==
His reigning period is uncertain; he is attested between 188 and 163 BC. Following Mithrobouzanes' succession, his rule was contested by his brother Artaxias I, who claimed the right to rule over Sophene based on his succession rights (primogeniture). However, Mithrobouzanes managed to preserve the independence of their kingdom, due to their diplomatic (and possibly dynastic) link with Cappadocia. The next known successor of Mithrobouzane was Arkathias.

== Sources ==
- Marciak, Michał (2017). Sophene, Gordyene, and Adiabene: Three Regna Minora of Northern Mesopotamia Between East and West. BRILL. ISBN 9789004350724.
- Schmitt, Rüdiger (2005). "Personal Names, Iranian iv. Parthian Period". Encyclopædia Iranica, online edition. New York.
