= Tmorik =

Historical region of Armenia

Tmorik (Old Armenian: Տմորիք, romanized: Tmorikʼ) was a region and system of defenses in the south of the Kingdom of Armenia. It was named after its main fortress, which was also known as Alki. It was built in ancient times (2nd millennium BCE) as a bulwark against threats coming from Mesopotamia. Once a district (gawaṙ) of its own the province of Korchayk, it was later attached to the district of Kordrik, probably under the Arsacid dynasty. It is identified with the Tume or Tumurru mentioned in 13th–7th-century BCE Assyrian cuneiform inscriptions as one of the Nairi lands. It may be one of the lands mentioned by Strabo which were conquered by Artaxias I in the 2nd century BCE. Strabo refers to a land called Taronitis, which has alternatively been read as *Tamonitis and identified with Tmorik.

Robert Hewsen identifies Tmorik as the region surrounding the fortress of Tman on the slopes of Mt. Sararad/Ararad (modern-day Mount Judi in southeastern Turkey). However, this is disputed by Michał Marciak, who, following Heinrich Hübschmann, identified the fortress of Tmorik/Alki with the town of Elki (modern-day Beytüşşebap, Turkey) on the east bank of the Khabur River (a tributary of the Tigris).

== See also ==
- List of regions of ancient Armenia
