= Giusto Traina =

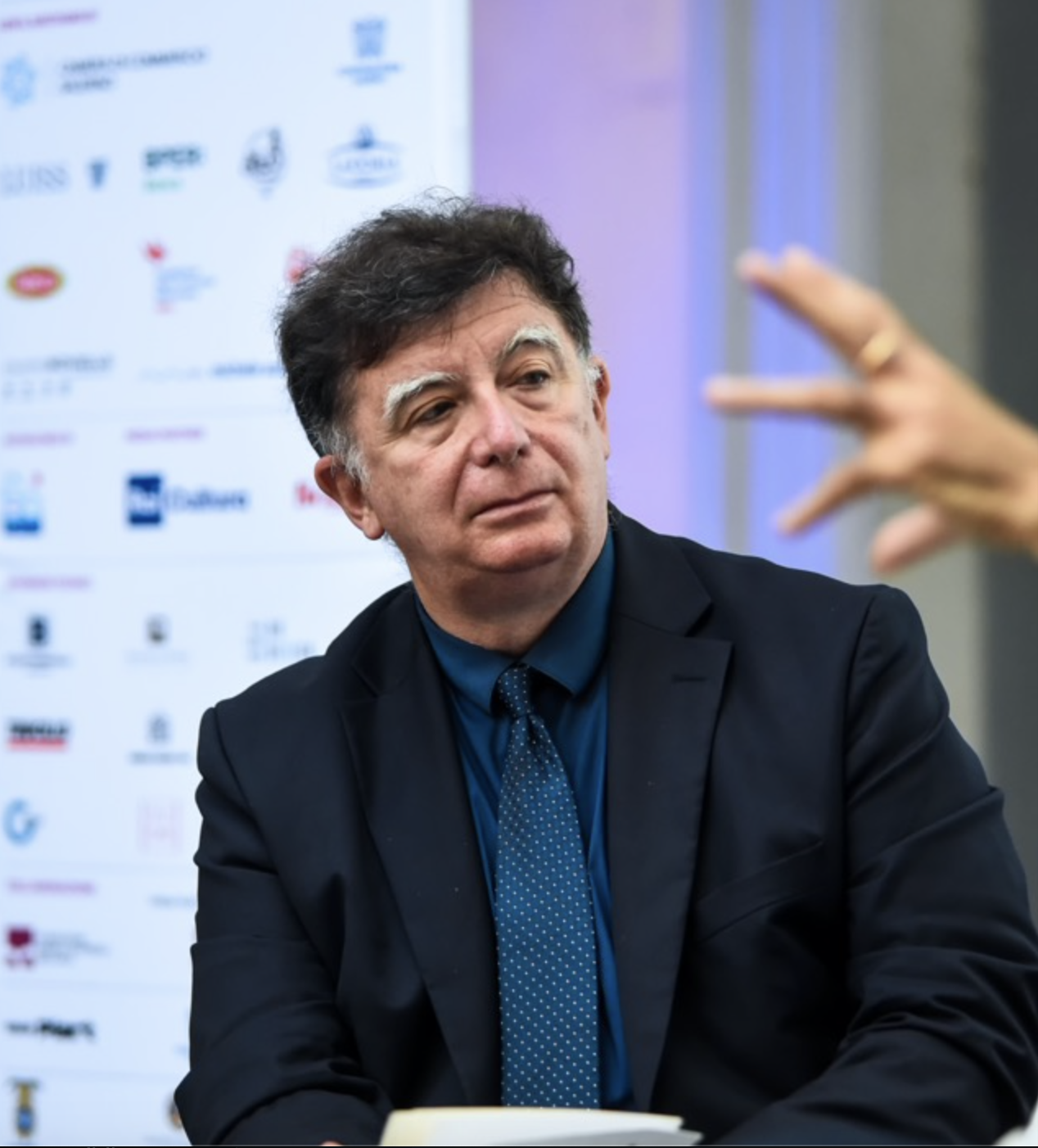
Giusto Traina, Salerno, June 2023

Giusto Traina (born 1959) is a prominent Italian ancient historian and Byzantinist. Since 2011 he has been a professor of Roman history at Sorbonne Université and, since 2023, also at the Università del Salento. He is a former senior member of the Institut Universitaire de France (2014-2019). He is the author of numerous books and articles. Formerly interested in ancient landscapes and techniques, he is currently involved in a long-term research about ancient Armenia.

== Life ==
Traina was born in Palermo. He was awarded the Premio Nazionale 'Cherasco Storia' (2011) for his book La resa di Roma. Battaglia a Carre, 9 giugno 53 a.C. (Laterza 2010).

He is a member of the Conseil Scientifique de la recherche historique de la Défense.

He was recently Fellow of the Berliner Antike-Kolleg (Summer 2014), of the Bogliasco Foundation (February 2016), and of the Topoi Excellence Cluster at Berlin (Spring 2016; Summer 2017). He was Dumanian Visiting Professor at the University of Chicago (Spring term 2017). He is presently visiting professor at the Westfälische Wilhelms-Universität Münster.

In the Anglophone world he is most noted for his book 428 AD : An Ordinary Year at the End of the Roman Empire (Princeton, 2009), in which he which gives a panoramic view across the geographical extents of the Roman Empire in a single year.
