= Ilya Shifman =

Ilya Sholeimovich Shifman (Russian: Илья́ Шо́леймович Ши́фман, pseudonym Кораблёв Korablyov; 1 June 1930 – 4 March 1990) was a Soviet historian, Orientalist and Classics scholar. He was awarded the degree Doctor of Historical Sciences in 1973. He worked at the Leningrad department of the Institute of Oriental Studies of the Russian Academy of Sciences.

Ilya Shifman studied at the faculty of Oriental studies at Leningrad State University but, after closure of that faculty, moved to the faculty of history. From 1959 to 1960 he did post-graduate studies at the department of Ancient Greece and Rome of the faculty of history of the Leningrad State University, concentrating on the Phoenician colonization of the Western Mediterranean area. Thereafter he worked at the Institute of Oriental Manuscripts of the Russian Academy of Sciences as well as at the Leningrad State University. He mainly published works on Carthage and Phoenicia. Nevertheless, as Aleksandr Grushevoy notes, Oriental studies remained closer to Shifman's heart than Classics.

From 1989 to 1990 he served as the first chairman of the Jewish cultural society in Leningrad.

== Scientific works ==
Shifman authored more than 100 works.

=== Dissertations ===
- Финикийская колонизация Западного Средиземноморья и возникновение Карфагенской державы. Автореф. дисс. … к. и. н. Л., Ин-т археологии. 1961.
- Социальные и экономические отношения в Сирии в I—III вв. н. э. Автореф. дисс. … д. и. н. М., 1971.

=== Selected monographs ===
- Возникновение Карфагенской державы. («Палестинский сборник». Вып. 12 (75). — М.-Л.: Издательство АН СССР, 1963. — 105 стр.
- Финикийский язык. (Серия «Языки народов Азии и Африки»). — М.: ИВЛ, 1963. — 68 стр. 1200 экз. (2-е изд. М., УРСС. 2003)
- Набатейское государство и его культура. Из истории культуры доисламской Аравии. (Серия «Культура народов Востока. Материалы и исследования»). — М.: Наука, 1976. — 163 стр. 3000 экз. (2-е изд. СПб, Издательство СПбГУ. 2007)
- Сирийское общество эпохи принципата (1-3 вв. н. э.). — М.: Наука, 1977. — 310 стр. 2400 экз.
- Угаритское общество (XIV—XIII вв. до н. э.) — М.: Наука, 1982. — 392 стр. 1000 экз.
- Ilya Schiffmann. Phönizisch-Punische Mythologie und geschichtliche Überliefering in der Widerspiegelung der antiken Geschichtssreibung. Roma, 1986.
- Культура древнего Угарита (XIV—XIII вв. до н. э.). — М., Наука, 1987. — 236 стр. 2000 экз.
- Ветхий завет и его мир: (Ветхий завет как памятник литературной и общественной мысли древней Передней Азии). — М.: Политиздат, 1987. — 240 стр. 200000 экз. (2-е изд. СПб, Издательство СПбГУ. 2007)
- Карфаген. / Сост. и автор вступ. ст. И. Р. Тантлевский. — СПб.: Издательство СПбГУ, 2006. — 518 стр.
