= Gagik Sargsyan =

Armenian historian

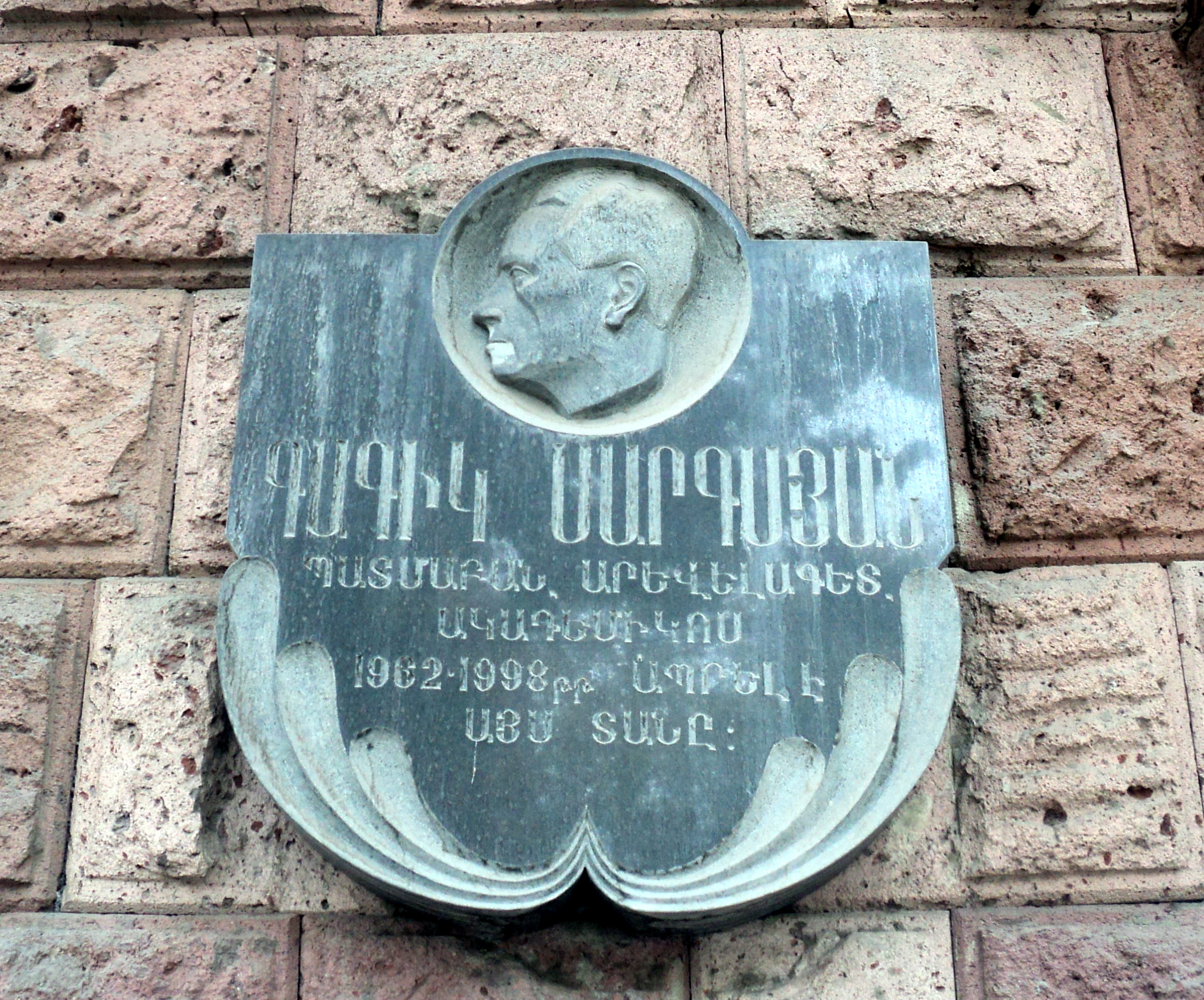
- Gagik Sargsyan's plaque in Yerevan
- Born: 6 April 1926; Yerevan, Transcaucasian Socialist Federative Soviet Republic
- Died: 25 August 1998 (aged 72); Yerevan, Armenia
- Education: Yerevan State University Leningrad State University (1950)
- Known for: Vice-president of the Armenian Academy of Sciences
- Scientific career
- Fields: Historian, academic
- Workplaces: Institute of History of the Armenian Academy of Sciences (1954-1962); ِDeputy Director (1962-1966); Director of the Institute of Oriental Studies of the Armenian Academy of Sciences; Professor of Yerevan State University; Academic-secretary of Humanitarian branch of the Armenian Academy of Sciences

Gagik Sargsyan (Armenian: Գագիկ Խորենի Սարգսյան; 6 April 1926, in Yerevan – 25 August 1998, in Yerevan) was an Armenian historian, who was the vice president of the Armenian Academy of Sciences.

== Biography ==
Sarkisyan studied at Yerevan State University, then finished Leningrad State University in 1950. From 1954 to 1962, he worked at the Institute of History of the Armenian Academy of Sciences, and was deputy director of the Institute of History of the Armenian Academy of Sciences (1962-1966). He was the director of the Institute of Oriental Studies of the Armenian Academy of Sciences and a professor at Yerevan State University. He was academic-secretary of the humanitarian branch of the Armenian Academy of Sciences.

He is known for his works dedicated to Armenian and Oriental history, including the academic work dedicated to the Armenian historian Movses Khorenatsi.

== Honors and awards ==
- Honorary member of Syrian Historical Society (1985)
- State Prize of the Armenian SSR (1985)
