= Teghut, Tavush =

Village in Tavush, Armenia

Teghut Թեղուտ
- Location within Armenia Location within Tavush
- Coordinates: 40°46′40″N 44°56′06″E
- Country: Armenia
- Province: Tavush
- Municipality: Dilijan

Population (2011)
  - Total: 1,342
- Time zone: UTC+4 (AMT)

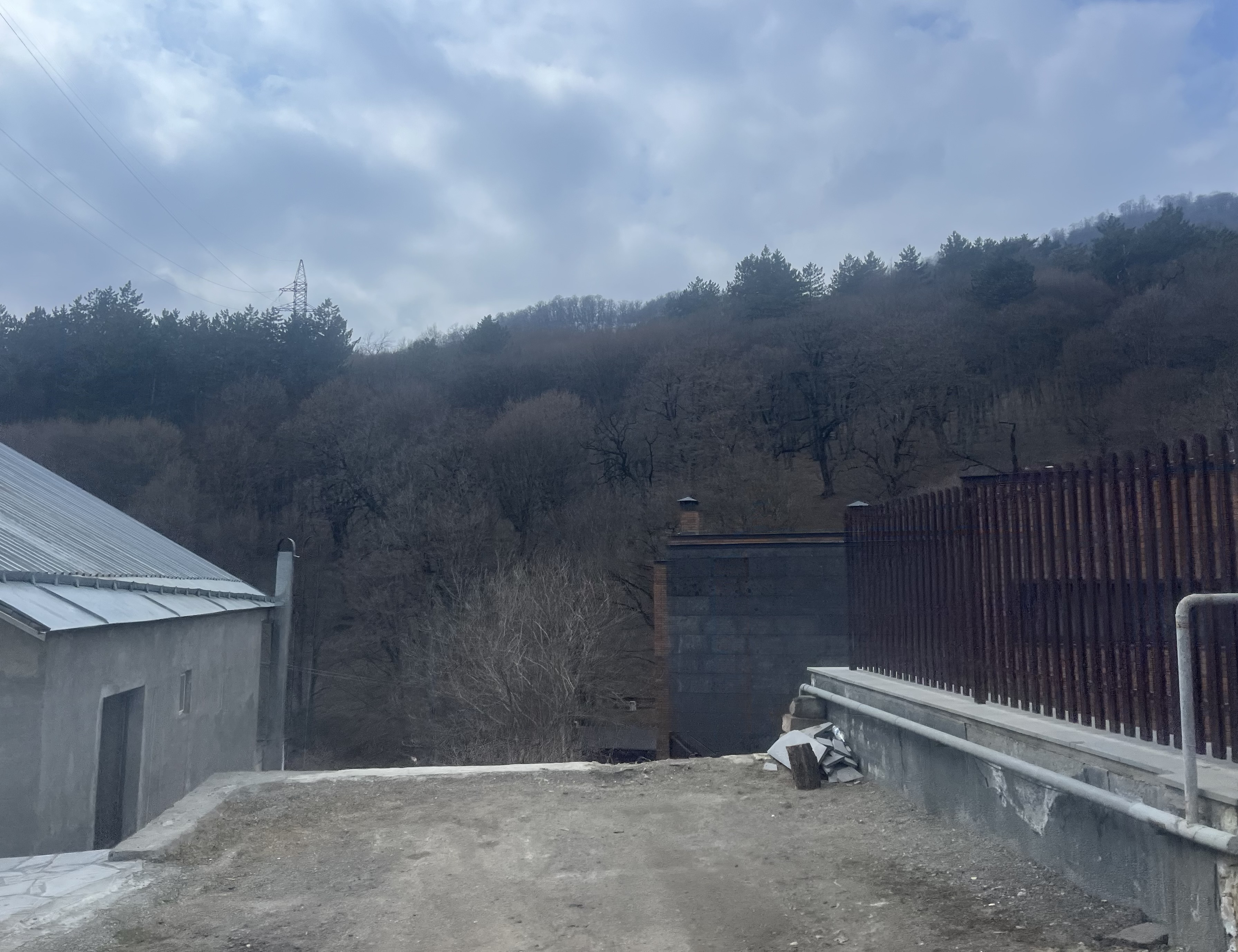
Teghut, Tavush

Teghut (Armenian: Թեղուտ) is a village in the Dilijan Municipality of the Tavush Province of Armenia.
