= Michał Marciak =

Michał Marciak (born 16 March 1981 in Kraków) is Associate Professor of History at Jagiellonian University since 2018, specializing in the historical geography of the ancient Near East. He has a MA in history (2007), a MA in theology (2007), and received his PhD in 2012 from the Faculty of Humanities of the University of Leiden.

== Selected publications ==
A selection of Marciak's works:

- Marciak, M.; Szypuła, B.; Sobiech, M.; Pirowski, T. (2021). "The Battle of Gaugamela and the Question of Visibility on the Battlefield". Iraq. 83: 87–103. doi:10.1017/irq.2021.11. S2CID 240824299.
- Pirowski, Tomasz, Michał Marciak, and Marcin Sobiech. 2021. "Potentialities and Limitations of Research on VHRS Data: Alexander the Great’s Military Camp at Gaugamela on the Navkur Plain in Kurdish Iraq as a Test Case" Remote Sensing 13, no. 5: 904. https://doi.org/10.3390/rs13050904
- MARCIAK, Michał. The Upper Tigris Region between Rome, Iran, and Armenia. ELECTRUM, 2021, Volume 28, p. 151-161, lip. 2021. ISSN 2084-3909. Available at: <https://www.ejournals.eu/electrum/2021/Volume-28/art/19458/>. Date accessed: 02 lip. 2021 doi:https://doi.org/10.4467/20800909EL.21.011.13369.
- Marciak, M. (2019): Idumea and the Idumeans in Josephus’ Retelling of the Bible, Revue Biblique 126, 235-253
- Comfort, A., Marciak, M. (2018): How did the Persian king of kings get his wine? The upper Tigris in antiquity (700 BCE to 636 CE), Archaeopress Publishing Ltd., Oxford, UK, pp. IV, 147.
- Marciak, M. (2018): Roman Adiabene? Concerning the Origin of a Historical and Cultural Misconception, in: C.S. Sommer, S. Matešic (eds.), Limes XXIII. Proceedings of the 23rd International Congress of Roman Frontier Studies Ingolstadt 2015. Akten des 23. Internationalen Limeskongresses in Ingolstadt 2015. Beiträge zum Welterbe Limes Sonderband 4 (Bad Homburg v.d.H. 2018), 668-671.
- Marciak, M.(2017): Sophene, Gordyene, and Adiabene: The Three Regna Minora of Northern Mesopotamia between East and West, Brill Publishers: Impact of Empire 26, Leiden – Boston.
- Marciak, M. 2016: The Site of Tigranokerta. Status Quaestionis, Acta Antiqua Academiae Scientiarum Hungaricae 56, 293-314.
- Marciak, M., Wójcikowski, R. (2016): Images of Kings of Adiabene: Numismatic and Sculptural Evidence, Iraq [Journal of the British Institute for the Study of Iraq] 78, 79-101
- Marciak, M. (2014): Izates, Helena, and Monobazos of Adiabene. A Study on Literary Traditions and History, Harrassowitz: Philippika 66, Wiesbaden
