= Sames I =

3rd-century BC Near Eastern king

- Rey De Sofene
- Coin of Sames I

King of Sophene and Commagene
- Reign: c. 260 BC
- Predecessor: Orontes III
- Successor: Arsames I
- Issue: Arsames I
- Dynasty: Orontid dynasty

Sames I (also spelled Samos I) was the Orontid king of Sophene, Armenia and Commagene, ruling around 260 BC.

== Name ==
The name Samos possibly derives from the Avestan name Sāma, the grandfather of the Avestan hero Garshasp, which would indicate some sort of custom of Iranian religious or epic lore amongst the Orontids.

== Biography ==
The Kingdom of Sophene was ruled by the Orontid dynasty, a dynasty of Iranian origin which ruled the Satrapy of Armenia under the Achaemenid Empire. The Orontids were descended from Orontes I, a Bactrian nobleman who was the son-in-law of the Achaemenid King of Kings Artaxerxes II (r. 404–358 BC). According to the Greek writer Strabo (died 24 AD) in his Geographica, Sophene first emerged as a distinct kingdom under Zariadres (fl. 190 BC), who was installed as its ruler by the Seleucid king Antiochus III the Great (r. 222–187 BC). He further adds that following the defeat of Antiochus III against the Romans, Zariadres declared independence. However this report is strongly contradicted by epigraphic and numismatic evidence. Sophene most likely emerged as a distinct kingdom in the 3rd-century BC, during the gradual decline of Seleucid influence in the Near East and the split of the Orontid dynasty into several branches. Three rulers belonging to a different Orontid branch, Sames I, Arsames I and Xerxes ruled the western part of Greater Armenia, perhaps from Commagene to Arzanene.

== Building activity ==
Sometime before 245 BC, Sames I refounded the city of Samosata on the previous Neo-Hittite site of Kummuh. He may have refounded the city in order to assert his claim over the area, a common practice amongst Iranian and Hellenistic dynasties, such as Cappadocia, Pontus, Parthia and Armenia. The city was built in a "sub-Achaemenid" Persian architectural form, similar to the rest of Orontid buildings in Greater Armenia. Naming cities such as Samosata (Middle Persian *Sāmašād; Old Persian *Sāmašiyāti-) the "joy of" or "happiness of" was an Orontid (and later Artaxiad) practice that recalled the Achaemenid royal discourse. Samosata served as one of the most important royal residences of the Orontid kings of Sophene.

== Coinage ==
Similar to the early Arsacids of Parthia and Frataraka of Persis, the Orontids of Sophene experimented with images of Iranian royal power. On his coins, Sames I is shown as clean-shaven and wearing the kyrbasia, a type of headgear originally worn by the satraps of the Achaemenid Empire. The tip of Sames I's kyrbasia is more prominent, similar to that of the headgear worn by the early Ariarathids of Cappadocia.

== Sources ==
- Canepa, Matthew (2018). The Iranian Expanse: Transforming Royal Identity Through Architecture, Landscape, and the Built Environment, 550 BCE–642 CE. Oakland: University of California Press. ISBN 9780520379206.
- Canepa, Matthew (2021). "Commagene Before and Beyond Antiochos I". Common Dwelling Place of all the Gods: Commagene in its Local, Regional, and Global Context. Franz Steiner Verlag. pp. 71–103. ISBN 978-3515129251.
- Canepa, Matthew P. (2017). "Rival Images of Iranian Kingship and Persian Identity in Post-Achaemenid Western Asia". In Strootman, Rolf; Versluys, Miguel John (eds.). Persianism in Antiquity. Franz Steiner Verlag. pp. 201–223. ISBN 978-3515113823.
- Facella, Margherita (2021). "Orontids". In Yarshater, Ehsan (ed.). Encyclopædia Iranica (Online ed.). Encyclopædia Iranica Foundation.
- Marciak, Michał (2017). Sophene, Gordyene, and Adiabene: Three Regna Minora of Northern Mesopotamia Between East and West. BRILL. ISBN 9789004350724.
- Michels, Christoph (2021). "'Achaemenid' and 'Hellenistic' Strands of Representation in the Minor Kingdoms of Asia Minor". Common Dwelling Place of all the Gods: Commagene in its Local, Regional, and Global Context. Franz Steiner Verlag. pp. 475–496. ISBN 978-3515129251.
