= Arsames (disambiguation) =

Arsames (died c. 520 BC) was the son of Ariaramnes and possibly a King of Persia. The name means "having a hero's strength".

Arsames may also refer to:

- Arsames (satrap of Cilicia), 4th-century BCE Persian general defeated by Alexander the Great at Granicus
- Arsames (satrap of Egypt), 5th-century BCE Persian ruler of Egypt
- Arsames I, king of Sophene (reigned 260 BCE-228 BCE)
- Arsames II, a later King of Sophene - or possibly the same as Arsames I (born c. 230 BCE)
- Arsames (band), a Persian melodic death metal band from Mashhad, Iran
