= Orontes II =

Satrap of Armenia from 336 to 301 BC

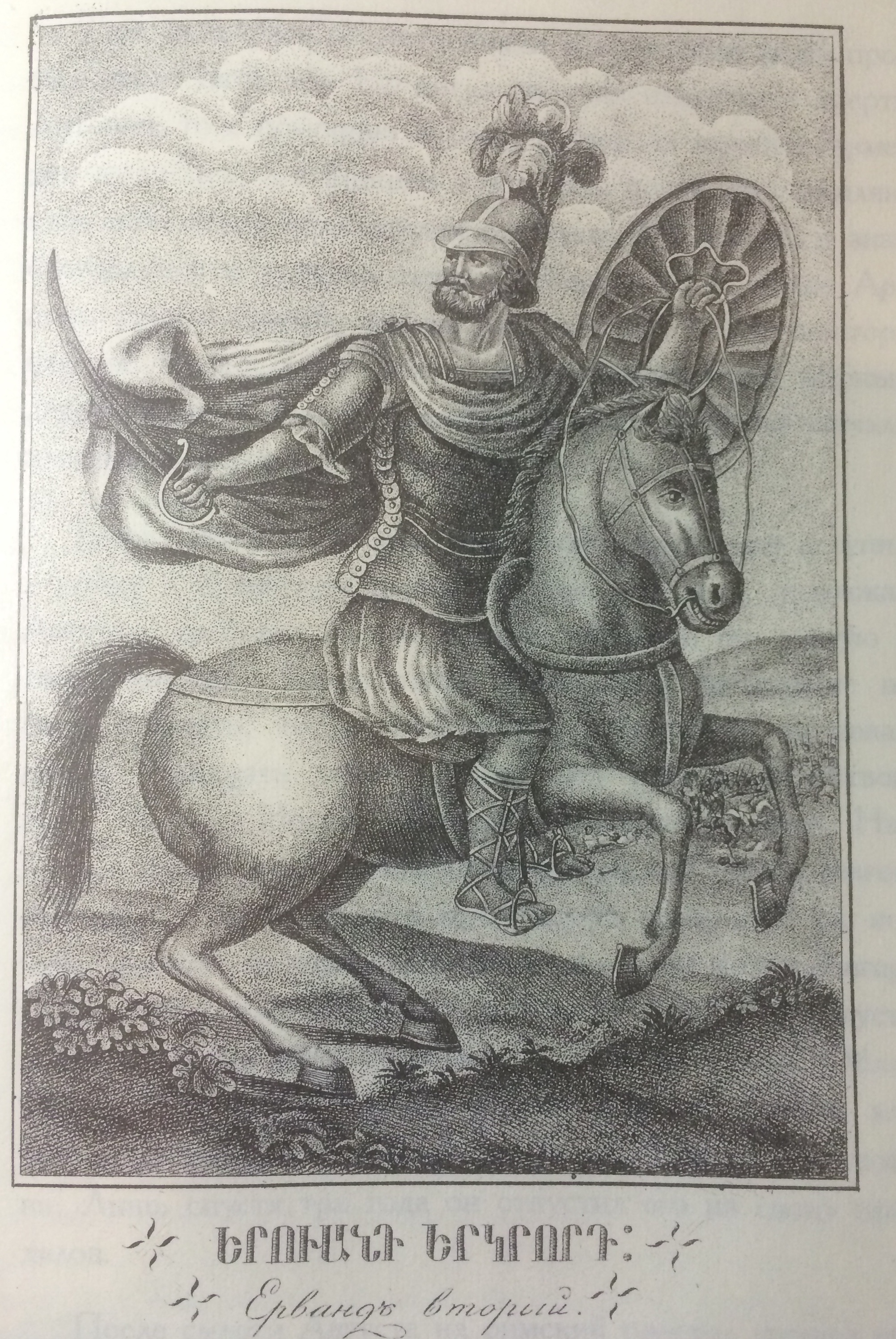
- 19th-century imaginary illustration of Orontes II

Satrap of Armenia
- Reign: 336–331 BC
- Predecessor: Darius III

King of Armenia
- Reign: 331 BC
- Successor: Mithrenes (?)
- Died: 331 BC; Gaugamela
- Issue: Mithrenes (?)
- Dynasty: Orontid dynasty
- Father: Orontes I (?)
- Mother: Rhodogune (?)
- Religion: Zoroastrianism

Orontes II (Old Persian: *Arvanta-) was a Persian noble living in the 4th century BC. He is probably to be identified as the satrap of Armenia under Darius III, and may in fact have succeeded Darius in this position when Darius ascended the throne of Persia in 336 BC.

== Name ==
"Orontes" (Ancient Greek: Ὀρόντης) is the Greek transliteration of the Old Persian name *Arvanta, which continued in Middle and New Persian as Arvand. The name is related to the Avestan word auruuaṇt- ("swift, vigorous, brave"), which itself may be an abbreviated version of the Avestan name Auruuaṱ.aspa- ("having swift horses").

== Biography ==
Arrian lists Orontes and a certain Mithraustes as two commanders of Armenian forces in the Battle of Gaugamela in 331 BC. The interpretation of this passage is controversial, with different historians interpreting it as indicating that Mithraustes commanded the infantry, or that there were two different contingents of Armenian cavalry in this battle, or even that Armenia was divided into two parts ruled by two satraps.

Orontes fought at the Battle of Gaugamela on the Persian right flank with 40,000 units of infantry and 7,000 of cavalry under his command, where he died. His son, Mithrenes, Satrap of Lydia, had joined Alexander the Great after being defeated at Sardis in 334 BC, and fought at Gaugamela on the side of Alexander. After the battle, Mithrenes was made Satrap of Armenia by Alexander.

Orontes dying at Gaugamela has been contested; Diodorus and Polyaenus mention a man named Orontes, who was a Satrap of Armenia during the Second War of the Diadochi; Diodorus adds that this Orontes was a friend of Peucestas. Andrew Burn, Edward Anson and Waldemar Heckel consider this satrap to be the same Orontes who fought for Darius III in the Battle of Gaugamela; Anson and Heckel state that Mithrenes may have perished in an unsuccessful attempt to wrest Armenia from Orontes. Heckel stated that in all likelihood Armenia, which was bypassed by the Macedonian army, was never part of Alexander's empire. Anson, on the other hand, considered it likely that at some point after the Battle of Gaugamela Orontes made his submission to Alexander, who later put him in charge of the Greater Armenia. N. G. L. Hammond interpreted the sources as indicating that Armenia was already in submission when Mithrenes was sent there from Babylon late in 331 BC, that Mithrenes took it over as satrap ruling on behalf of the new Macedonian regime, and that he was left as satrap in 323 BC when Perdiccas let some satrapies remain under the existing satraps; in 317 BC Mithrenes was no longer satrap but had been replaced by Orontes.

One of the inscriptions from the Mount Nemrut detailing the ancestry of Antiochus I Theos of Commagene mentions an ancestor whose name was incompletely preserved, and who was a son of Aroandas. This Aroandas (Orontes) is inferred to be the second ancestor of Antiochus listed in the inscriptions from Mount Nemrut who bore that name, succeeding the first Aroandas, who in turn was the son of Artasyrus and who married Rhodogune, the daughter of Artaxerxes II of Persia. Friedrich Karl Dörner and John H. Young (1996) interpreted the first preserved letter of the name of the son of Aroandas II as a delta, so that the name ended with -δανης, -danes. The authors considered this reading to be important, because it settled the proposal of Ernst Honigmann's ([Mιθρ]άνην), as well as one of the suggestions presented by Salomon Reinach ([Όστ]άνην). Brijder (2014) also interpreted the inscription as indicating that name of the son of Orontes II ended with -danes.

Aroandas II mentioned in an inscription from Mount Nemrut was identified with the Orontes who was a commander in the Battle of Gaugamela by Karl Julius Beloch and Herman Brijder. This Orontes was also inferred to be a descendant of Orontes I and his wife Rhodogune, possibly their son or grandson. On the other hand, Friedrich Karl Dörner was unsure whether ancient citations of connections of the bearers of the name Aroandas/Orontes with Armenia or their status as leaders of Armenian military units are compelling reasons for assuming that they were relatives. Dörner considered it very questionable whether Aroandas II mentioned in an inscription from Mount Nemrut is identical with the Orontes of Alexander's time; the author stressed the need to consider that in the course of the 4th century BC, besides the two ancestors of Antiochus I of Commagene, other bearers of the same name may have played a part in Persian politics.

== Bibliography ==
=== Ancient works ===
- Arrian, The Anabasis of Alexander
- Diodorus Siculus, Bibliotheca historica
- Quintus Curtius Rufus, Histories of Alexander the Great

=== Modern works ===
- Boyce, Mary; Grenet, Frantz (1991). Beck, Roger (ed.). A History of Zoroastrianism, Zoroastrianism under Macedonian and Roman Rule. Leiden: Brill. ISBN 978-9004293915.
- Brijder, Herman (2014). Nemrud Dağı: Recent Archaeological Research and Conservation Activities in the Tomb Sanctuary on Mount Nemrud. Walter de Gruyter. ISBN 978-1-61451-713-9.
- Burn, A. R. (1985). "Persia and the Greeks". In Gershevitch, Ilya (ed.). The Cambridge History of Iran: The Median and Achaemenian Periods. Vol. 2. Cambridge: Cambridge University Press. pp. 292–391. ISBN 0-521-20091-1.
- Chaumont, M. L. (1986). "Armenia and Iran ii. The pre-Islamic period". In Yarshater, Ehsan (ed.). Encyclopædia Iranica. Vol. II/4: Architecture IV–Armenia and Iran IV. London and New York: Routledge & Kegan Paul. pp. 418–438. ISBN 978-0-71009-104-8.
- Hammond, N. G. L. (1996). "Alexander and Armenia". Phoenix. 50 (2): 130–137. doi:10.2307/1192698. JSTOR 1192698. (registration required)
- Heckel, Waldemar (2006). Who's Who in the Age of Alexander the Great: Prosopography of Alexander's Empire. Blackwell Publishing.
- Lang, David M. (1983). "Iran, Armenia and Georgia". In Yarshater, Ehsan (ed.). The Cambridge History of Iran: The Seleucid, Parthian and Sasanian Periods. Vol. 3(1). Cambridge: Cambridge University Press. pp. 505–536. ISBN 0-521-20092-X.
- Marciak, Michał (2017). Sophene, Gordyene, and Adiabene: Three Regna Minora of Northern Mesopotamia Between East and West. BRILL. ISBN 9789004350724.
- Osborne, Michael J. (1973). "Orontes". Historia: Zeitschrift für Alte Geschichte. 22 (4): 515–551. ISSN 0018-2311. JSTOR 4435366.
- Schmitt, Rüdiger (2002). "Orontes". In Yarshater, Ehsan (ed.). Encyclopædia Iranica (Online ed.). Encyclopædia Iranica Foundation.
