= Antiochis (sister of Antiochus III) =

Queen consort of Sophene and Commagene
- Reign: 212 BC – c. 204/202 BC
- Born: c. 244/243 BC
- Spouse: Arsames I (possibly); Xerxes of Sophene
- Issue: Mithridates
- Dynasty: Seleucid dynasty
- Father: Seleucus II Callinicus
- Mother: Laodice II

Antiochis (Ancient Greek: Ἀντιοχίς; fl. 3rd–2nd century BC) was a princess of the Seleucid dynasty, daughter of Seleucus II Callinicus and Laodice II and sister of Antiochus III the Great. She may have been born in 244/243 BC as the twin sister of Seleucus III Ceraunus. In 212 BC, following his siege of Arsamosata, Antiochus III gave her in marriage to Xerxes of Sophene, making her queen consort of Sophene.

== Biography ==
Antiochis was a daughter of Seleucus II Callinicus and his wife Laodice III. She may have been born in 244/243 BC as the twin sister of the future Seleucus III Ceraunus.

Antiochis may have married Arsames I, king of Sophene, before c. 227 BC, when Arsames is attested as an ally of Antiochus Hierax, the rebellious brother of Seleucus II. From this marriage Mithridates was possibly born, who is described in Polybius 8.23.3 as "[Antiochus III's] sister’s son" and was proposed by some of the king's advisors as a candidate for the throne of Sophene in 212 BC.

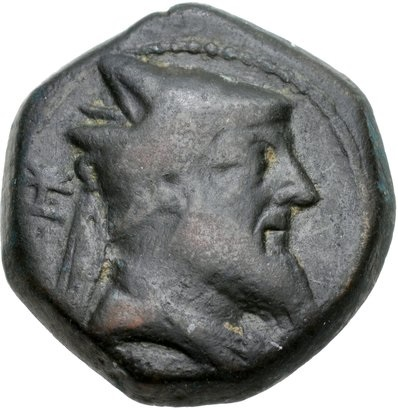
Coin of Xerxes of Armenia (220 BC), King of Sophene and Commagene, Antiochis' husband

In 212 BC, following his siege of Arsamosata, Antiochus III settled his differences with Xerxes, king of Sophene, remitting the greater part of the tribute owed and accepting a payment of 300 talents, 1,000 horses, and 1,000 mules. Xerxes was restored to his position as king and given Antiochis as his wife.

Xerxes died c. 204-202 BC. John of Antioch, a late source, reports that he was poisoned by Antiochis on instructions from her brother. Grainger judges this account unreliable, noting that poisoning was frequently alleged in cases of politically convenient death in the ancient world, and that neither Antiochus nor Antiochis had any obvious motive for such an act: Sophene was vulnerable, Antiochus was not under pressure of time, and Antiochis, having been queen for approximately a decade, had no evident reason to act against her husband. Grainger concludes that Xerxes most likely died a natural death, and that Antiochis subsequently returned to her brother's court in Syria, where Antiochus would have resumed his role as her legal guardian.

If Mithridates was indeed the son of Antiochis and Arsames, he may eventually have succeeded to the kingship that had been proposed for him in 212 BC. Mithridates, identified as satrap of Armenia in Polybius 25.2.11, is identified by some scholars as the same person as Antiochus III's nephew mentioned in Polybius 8.23.3. Lucherini further proposes that Seleucus IV Philopator imposed Mithridates on the throne of Sophene after the battle of Magnesia, possibly with the support of Pharnaces I of Pontus. As ruler of Sophene, Antiochis's son may have participated in the Anatolian war of 183–179 BC.
