= Tigranes (legendary) =

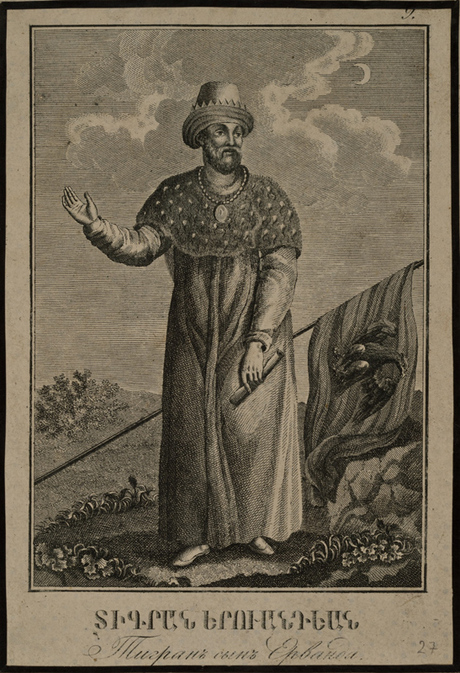
19th-century imaginary rendition of Tigranes

Tigranes (Armenian: Տիգրան) was a legendary Armenian prince, who was a contemporary of the Achaemenid ruler Cyrus the Great (r. 550–530 BC).

He appears in both the Cyropaedia of the Greek soldier and historian Xenophon (died 354 BC) and the History of Armenia of the 5th-century Armenian historian Movses Khorenatsi (died 490s AD). In the former, he is based on the Persian hyparch Tigranes, while in the latter he was further altered, becoming an Armenian hero, who was the embodiment of the Armenian king Tigranes the Great (r. 95–55 BC) and the Iranian hero Fereydun.

== In historiography ==
Tigranes appears in both the Cyropaedia of the Greek soldier and historian Xenophon (died 354 BC) and the History of Armenia of the 5th-century Armenian historian Movses Khorenatsi (died 490s AD). The Iranian name of "Tigranes", which was theophoric in nature, was uncommon during the Achaemenid era (550 BC–330 BC). Only two historical figures are known to bear the name during that period.

=== Xenophon ===
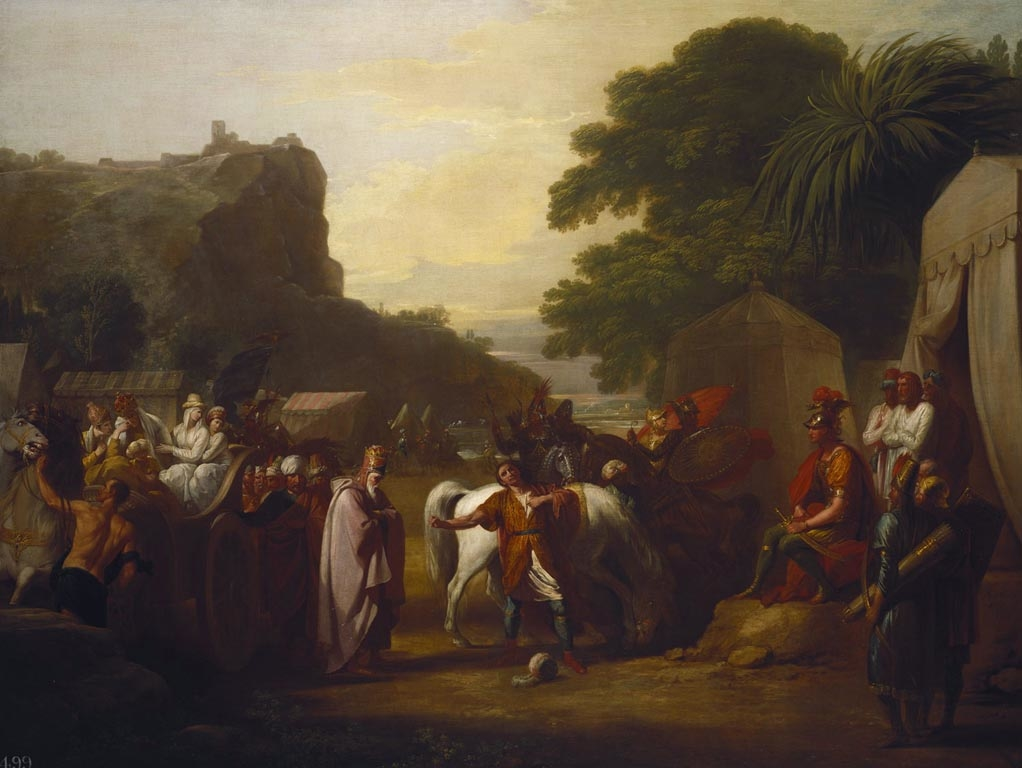
The Family of the King of Armenia before Cyrus by Benjamin West

According to the Cyropaedia of Xenophon, Tigranes was the son of an unnamed "king of Armenia" who had agreed to provide troops and pay a yearly tribute to the Median king Astyages after being defeated by him. When Media was invaded by the Chaldaeans during the reign of Astyages' son and successor Cyaxares, the "king of Armenia" refused to help him as he was obliged. As a result, Cyrus, who was the son of Astyages' daughter Mandana, quickly led an expedition into Armenia. The "king of Armenia" sent his family, including his younger son Sabaris as well as the treasury to the mountains. They were, however, captured by the Persian commander Chrysantas. The Armenians panicked at the approach of Cyrus, who captured their "king". Tigranes, the elder son of the "king" and "who had been Cyrus' companion once on a hunt" returned from a journey abroad and convinced Cyrus to pardon the "king" and reinstall him.

Tigranes served Cyrus faithfully, aiding him in his attack on Assyria, where the spoils were shared between the parties. He also took part in Cyrus' campaign into Babylonia. This account of Tigranes by Xenophon, which was not mentioned by Herodotus (died 425 BC), was considered "pure fabrication" by the Iranologist Alireza Shapur Shahbazi. Xenophon was known for creating ancient heroes by basing them on contemporary figures. Tigranes was most likely based on the Persian hyparch Tigranes, who was the son-in-law of Struthas and lived in the same period as Xenophon.

According to Shahbazi, the title of "king of Armenia" should not be taken seriously, as Xenophon also refers to the leader of Hyrcanians and satrap of Bactria as "kings".

=== Movses Khorenatsi ===
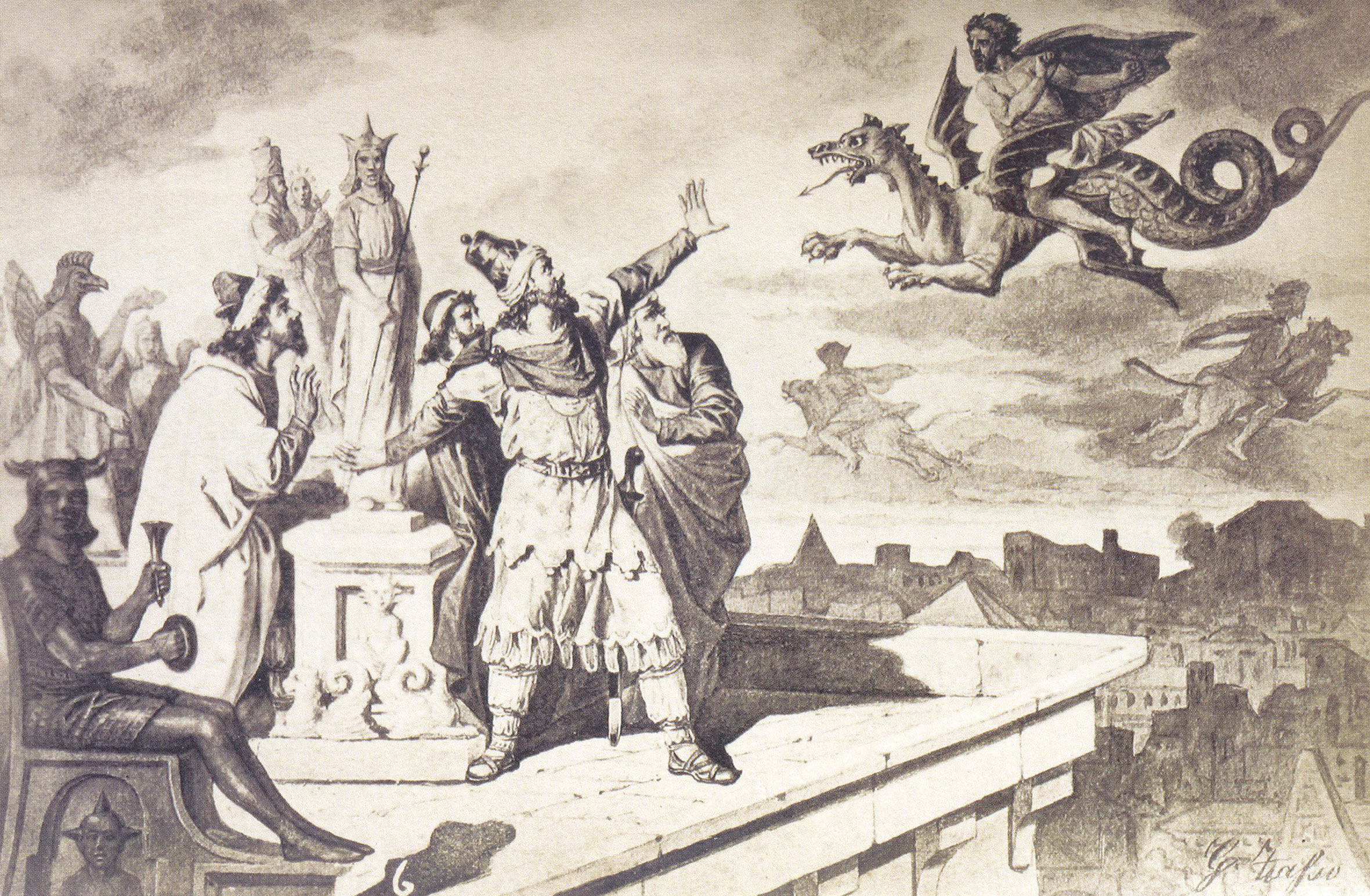
19th-century illustration of the dream of Azhdahak

The History of Armenia of Movses Khorenatsi was composed to serve as a "national" history of Armenia from the era of the giants to Arsacid rule. According to the book, Tigranes was the son of Eruand (Orontas/Aroandes/Orontes) "the Short-lived". The Median king Azhdahak was afraid of the power of Tigranes and his alliance with Cyrus. This was further reinforced by his dream of a woman on the top of a mountain which represented Armenia. There she birthed three giants, one of whom rode on "a monstrous dragon" and attacked Media, and thus foreshadowing Tigranes' attack on the country. In order to prevent this, Azhdahak married Tigranuhi, the prominent sister of Tigranes. He planned to use her to befriend Tigranes, invite him to Media and then kill him. Informed of the plot by his sister, Tigranes marched against Media at the head of a large force assembled from Cappadocia, Georgia, Caucasian Albania, and Greater and Lesser Armenia. There he freed Tigranuhi, and personally killed Azhdahak at a battle.

Tigranes afterwards had his sister sent to the city of Tigranakert, which he had founded and named after himself. He also had the family of Azhdahak and 10,000 Medes deported to the city of Azhdanakan in Armenia. Subsequently, Tigranes "with the willing help and encouragement of Cyrus, seized for himself the Empire of the Medes and Persians." He was survived by his sons Pap, Tiran and Vahagn. Vahe, who was a descendant of Vahagn, rebelled against Alexander of Macedon, who as a result killed him. This led to turmoil in Armenia until Arshak the Great (Vologases I of Parthia) installed his brother Valarshak (Tiridates I of Armenia) on the Armenian throne.

Scholarship has long agreed that the story is a mixture of history and various legends. Vahe is possibly an echo of Mithrenes, who along with Orontes II led the Armenian contingent at the Battle of Gaugamela in 331 BC. Eruand "the Short-lived" was a personification of the Orontid dynasty, the predecessors of the Artaxiad dynasty, whose most distinguished ruler was Tigranes the Great (r. 95–55 BC).

== Sources ==
- Marciak, Michał (2017). Sophene, Gordyene, and Adiabene: Three Regna Minora of Northern Mesopotamia Between East and West. BRILL. ISBN 978-9004350700.
- Shahbazi, A. Shapur (2017). Badian, Ernst (ed.). "Irano-Hellenic Notes: 1. The Three Faces of Tigranes". American Journal of Ancient History. 2 (2). De Gruyter: 124–136. doi:10.31826/9781463237547-002.
