= Orontes I =

Bactrian nobleman, military officer and satrap (died 344 BC)

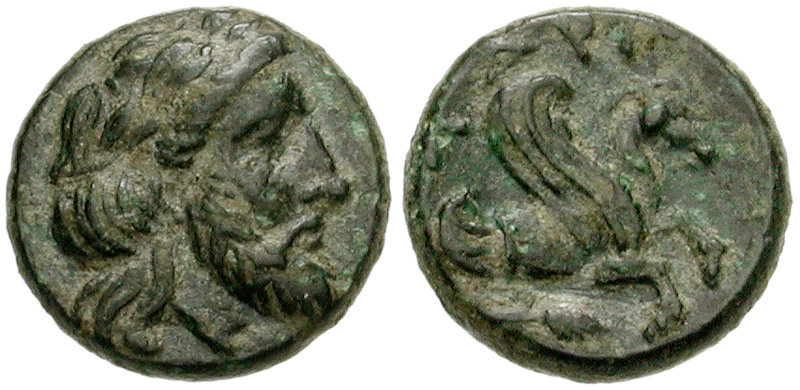
- Bronze coin of Orontes I, minted at Adramyteion between 357–352 BC
- Died: 344 BC
- Spouse: Rhodogune
- Relatives: Artasyrus (father); Orontes II (son or grandson)
- Military career
- Allegiance: Achaemenid Empire
- Conflicts: Battle of Cunaxa

Orontes I (Old Persian: *Arvanta-; died 344 BC) was a military officer of the Achaemenid Empire and satrap of Armenia at the end of the 5th-century BC and first half of the 4th-century BC. He is notable for having led the unsuccessful Great Satraps' Revolt in Asia Minor against the Achaemenids from 362/1 BC to 360/359 BC.

He was the son of Artasyrus, a high-ranking Bactrian nobleman. Through his maternal line, Orontes traced his descent back to the Persian magnate Hydarnes, one of the six companions of the King of Kings Darius the Great (r. 522–486 BC). Orontes first appears in records in 401 BC as the satrap of Armenia. There he participated in the Battle of Cunaxa, where he pursued the Ten Thousand following their retreat. In the same year, he married Rhodogune, a daughter of Artaxerxes II (r. 404–358 BC).

In the 380s BC, Orontes along with the satrap Tiribazus were assigned to lead the campaign against Evagoras I (r. 411–374 BC), the king of Salamis in Cyprus. The campaign was initially successful, with Evagoras offering to make peace. However, after the negotiations between him and Tiribazus failed, Orontes accused the latter of deliberately prolonging the war and planning to declare independence. This led to Tiribazus' dismissal and imprisonment, triggering a chain of events which ultimately weakened the Persian forces, forcing Orontes to make peace with Evagoras in 380 BC. Artaxerxes II did not deem the conclusion of the war satisfactory, and as a result Orontes fell into disfavour.

Orontes later reappears in 362/1 BC, as the hyparch (governor) of Mysia and the leader of the revolting satraps of Asia Minor. The revolt was shortlived, as Orontes betrayed his allies and shifted his allegiance back to Artaxerxes II. Orontes reportedly thought that he would be greatly rewarded if he did so at such a critical point. Since he was in possession of the troops and money, many other rebellious satraps followed suit. By 360/359 BC, the revolt had ended. Orontes revolted a second time in 354/3 BC, most likely due to his disappointment with the rewards he received by the king. He seized the town of Pergamon, but eventually reconciled with Artaxerxes II's son and successor Artaxerxes III (r. 358–338 BC) and gave him back the town. Orontes later died in 344 BC.

Orontes is regarded as the ancestor of the Orontid dynasty, which established itself in Armenia, Sophene, and Commagene during the Achaemenid and Hellenistic period. Orontes II, who was the satrap of Armenia and led the Armenian contingent (together with Mithrenes) at the Battle of Gaugamela in 331 BC, was either a son or grandson of Orontes.

== Name ==
"Orontes" is the Greek transliteration of the Old Persian name *Arvanta, which continued in Middle and New Persian as Arvand. The name is related to the Avestan word auruuaṇt- ("swift, vigorous, brave"), which itself may be an abbreviated version of the Avestan name Auruuaṱ.aspa- ("having swift horses").

== Background ==
Orontes was the son of Artasyrus, a Bactrian nobleman, who occupied the high-ranking office of the "King's Eye", and has been suggested be the same person as the namesake Iranian noble who participated in the Battle of Cunaxa in 401 BC. Orontes has therefore sometimes been referred to as "Orontes the Bactrian". He and his father are the only Bactrians who are known to have occupied high offices under the Achaemenid Empire. Bactrians that settled in other parts of the empire either did so by their own will or as garrison-colonists.

Orontes claimed descent from the Persian magnate Hydarnes, one of the six companions of Darius the Great (r. 522–486 BC). This claim is supported by Orontes' later marriage in 401 BC to Rhodogune, a daughter of Artaxerxes II (r. 404–358 BC). Since Orontes' paternal line was Bactrian, it was likely through his maternal line that his ancestry went back to Hydarnes. The Achaemenid satrapy of Armenia seems to have been a semi-hereditary fief of Hydarnes, due to his descendants governing it until the Hellenistic period. From his maternal side, Orontes may have been related to two Persian noblemen also named Orontes, whom were prominent figures at the end of the 5th-century BC. One of them had deserted Cyrus the Younger (died 401 BC) during his attempt to take the throne from Artaxerxes II, and as a result was executed. The other Orontes reportedly had bad relations with Artaxerxes II's mother Parysatis, eventually being executed at her behest.

According to the classical Greek author Plutarch (died after 119 AD), Orontes' appearance was similar to that of the Greek mythological figure Alcmaeon.

== Expedition to Cyprus ==
Map of ancient Cyprus and its city-kingdoms

Orontes first appears in records in 401 BC, when he as satrap of Armenia pursued the Ten Thousand following their retreat at Cunaxa. Armenia was divided into two separate satrapies, with the smaller, western part being governed by a hyparch, who was subordinate to the satrap of the rest of Armenia (referred to as "Armina" in the Behistun Inscription), which was Orontes. In 386/385 BC, Orontes was made joint commander of the Persian expedition against Evagoras I (r. 411–374 BC), the king of Salamis in Cyprus. He was assigned to the lead the Persian land forces, while Tiribazus, the satrap of Ionia, led the navy. Tiribazus had also participated in battle at Cunaxa, and reportedly knew Orontes from his early days in Armenia, as Tiribazus had served as the hyparch of its western part till 395 BC.

Evagoras had previously been a vassal of the Persian king, but had started to act more independently. Initially only ruling over Salamis, he had now gained control over several cities of Cyprus, despite Artaxerxes II's demand to refrain from doing so. Normally the Persian kings were little interested in the affairs of Cyprus, and would not interfere in the affairs of its kings. However, the conflict between Evagoras and the cities of Cyprus had caused instability. This disrupted Artaxerxes II's plans to attack Egypt, as Cyprus would also have to play a part in his expedition. As a result, Artaxerxes II sought to establish direct control over the island.

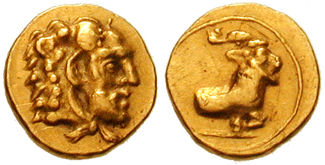
Coin minted by Evagoras I at Salamis

By 382 BC, preparations for the campaign had been made, with a battle taking place the following year near the Cyprian city of Kition, where the Persians emerged victorious due to their larger fleet. Evagoras withdrew to Salamis, which was soon besieged by the Persians. Failing to gain help from the Egypt pharaoh Hakor (r. 392/1–379/8 BC), Evagoras started to negotiate a peace treaty with Tiribazus, offering to withdraw from all the cities of Cyprus except Salamis, and pay a fixed yearly tribute to the Persian crown. Tiribazus was inclined to accept the offer, but the negotiations failed after Evagoras refused to also cede his status as king.

The negotiations made Orontes fear that Tiribazus would reap all the honor and rewards if he also finished the Cypriot War just after having led the reconquest of the eastern Mediterranean lands. As a result he sent a number of accusations to Artaxerxes II, which mentioned that Tiribazus was deliberately prolonging the war and planning to declare independence. Artaxerxes II was unable to make a proper assessment due to his distance, but could not risk Tiribazus ruin the recent Persian accomplishments, and as a result had him jailed in Susa.

Glos, who was the father-in-law of Tiribazus and commander of the fleet, feared that he might be accused of cooperating with him. As a result he returned to western Asia Minor, taking with him much of the Greek unit of the Persian forces. This heavily weakened the strength of the campaign force, as most of it was composed of Greeks. When the news reached the Asian Greek cities, some of them—mostly Ionian cities—attempted to gain independence. With the remaining forces, Orontes resumed the siege of Salamis, and launched an attack which was repelled. Moreover, he also faced insubordination and indifference from his troops, as a result of Tiribazus' arrest. Due to his weakened position, Orontes was forced to make peace with Evagoras in 380 BC. The terms of the treaty was that Evagoras was obligated to pay tribute to the Persian king, but as a subordinate king rather than a slave. Artaxerxes III did not deem the conclusion of the war satisfactory, as it had cost 15,000 talents, and as a result Orontes fell into disfavour. It may have been after this event that Orontes was dismissed as satrap of Armenia and sent to the distant region of Mysia. Meanwhile, Tiribazus was pardoned and restored to his former position.

== Activity in Asia Minor ==
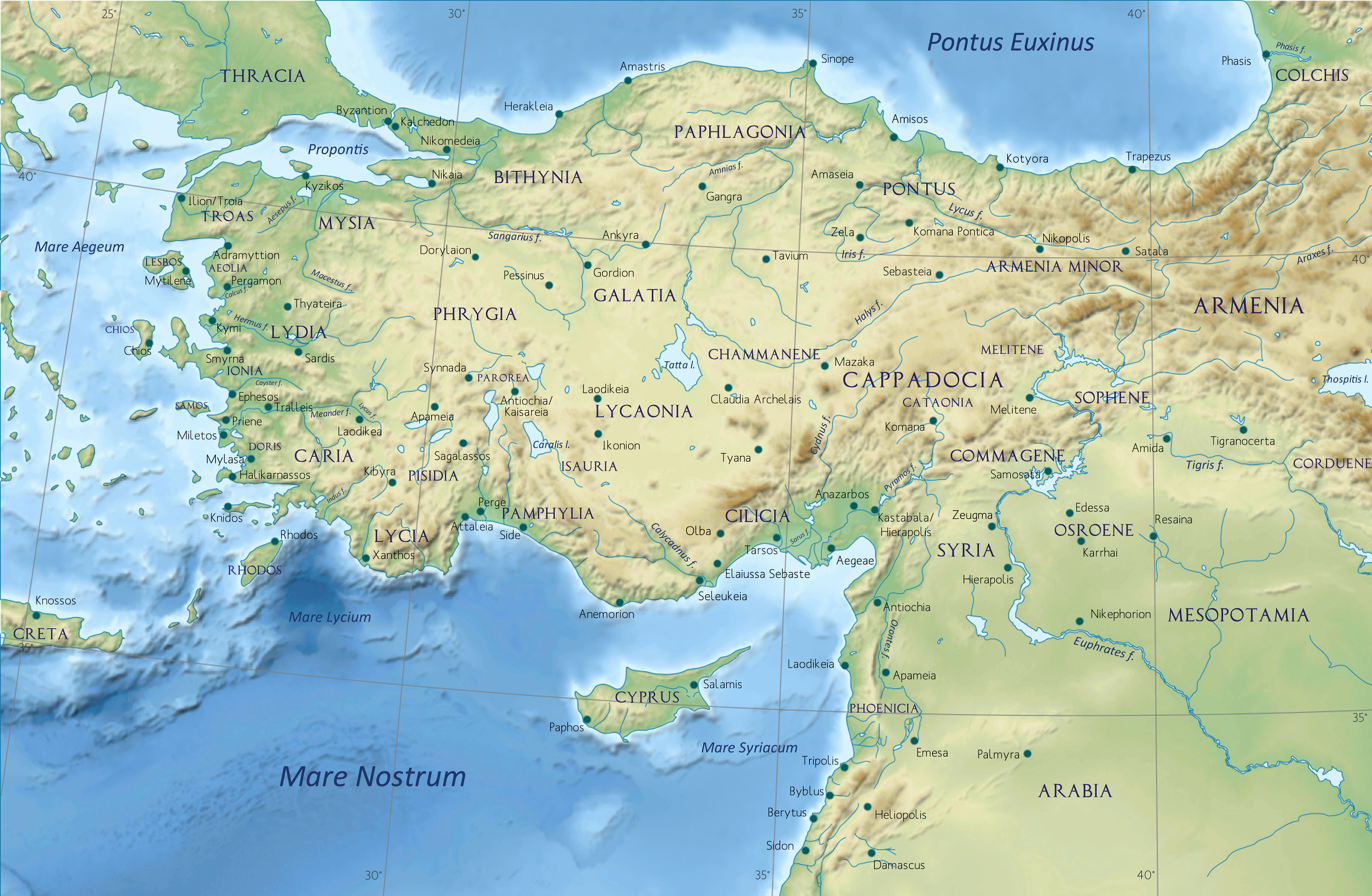
Map of Asia Minor

In 362/1 BC, Orontes reappears in sources as the hyparch of Mysia, subordinate to the satrap Autophradates at Sardis. Before that period, Orontes was attempting to expand his domain. As demonstrated by his coinage at Adramyttium and Cisthenes, he recruited mercenaries, who helped him capture the city of Cyme and defeat the cavalry forces sent there by Autophradates to stop him. In 362/1 BC, Orontes was chosen as the leader of the revolting satraps of Asia Minor due to his aristocratic background, his kinship with Artaxerxes II, as well as his hostility towards the latter. The revolt was a culmination of a series of revolts led by other satraps, starting from 366 BC. The details of Orontes' revolt are obscure. He may have reached as far as Syria, but this remains disputed. The revolt was shortlived, as Orontes betrayed his allies and shifted his allegiance back to Artaxerxes II. According to the classical Greek historian Diodorus Siculus (died c. 30 BC), Orontes thought that he would be greatly rewarded if he did so at such a critical point. Since Orontes was in possession of the troops and money, many other rebellious satraps followed suit. By 360/359 BC, the revolt had ended.

Orontes revolted a second time in 354/3 BC, most likely due to his disappointment with the rewards he received by the king. He seized the town of Pergamon, but eventually reconciled with Artaxerxes II's son and successor Artaxerxes III (r. 358–338 BC) and gave him back the town. Orontes later died in 344 BC.

== Legacy ==
Orontes is regarded as the ancestor of the Orontid dynasty, which established itself in Armenia, Sophene, and Commagene during the Achaemenid and Hellenistic period. Orontes II, who was the satrap of Armenia and led the Armenian contingent (together with Mithrenes) at the Battle of Gaugamela in 331 BC, was either a son or grandson of Orontes.

Orontes is mentioned in one of the stelae (monument containing information) of Mount Nemrut, erected by his descendant Antiochus I of Commagene (r. 70–31 BC). The inscription of the stelae places Orontes as the founder of the Orontid dynasty, and mentions his marriage with Rhodogune, in order to highlight the Commagenian claim to Achaemenid ancestry. A relief of Orontes was also erected on the stelae, which, however, has been destroyed.

== Coinage ==
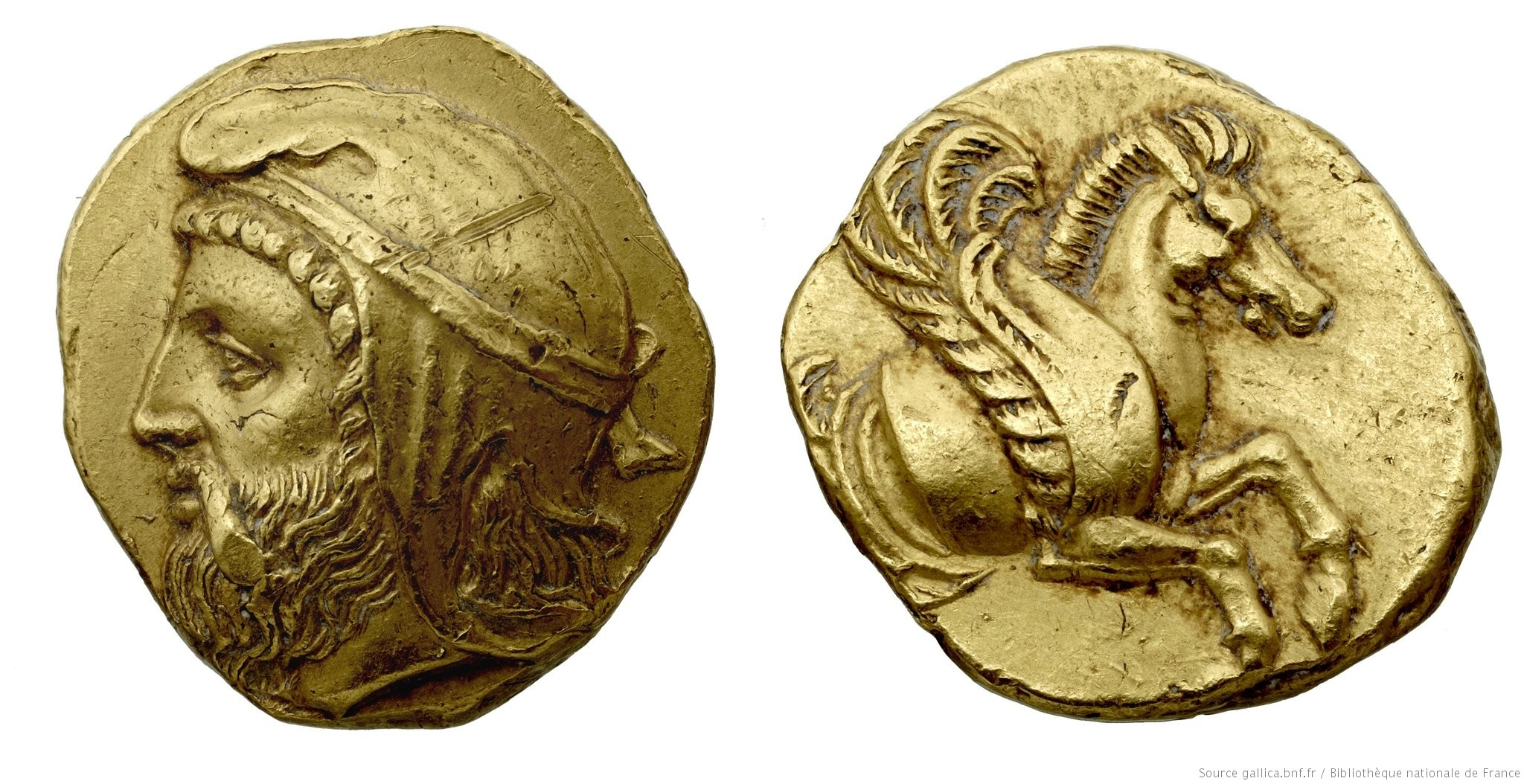
The gold coin attributed to Orontes I by some numismatists, minted at Lampsacus

Some numismatics have attributed the gold coins minted at Lampsacus to Orontes due to two reasons. The first reason was that they have the same mint location and reverse side as the bronze and silver coins of Orontes. However, it has now been the discovered that they did not share the same mint site, as the bronze and silver coins of Orontes were in reality minted at Adramyteion and Cisthene instead. The second reason was that these coins were all minted during the same period, between 387–330 BC according to the American numismatist Agnes Baldwin.

According to the numismatist Hyla A. Troxell, there is nothing that suggests Orontes controlled Lampsacus. When the satrap Artabazus rebelled against Artaxerxes III in 356 BC, he hired the Athenian military commander Chares. The latter inflicted a heavy defeat on the king's forces, and retook Sigeum and Lampsacus for Artabazus. Troxell argues that Orontes had already started his second revolt by then, due to his correspondence with the Athenians, who awarded him Athenian citizenship. He further adds that Chares would not have taken Lampsacus from Orontes, due to the latter being a relative of Artabazus (Note: Artabazus's mother was Apama, a daughter of Artaxerxes II.) and also being in rebellion against the king at the time. In 352 BC, Lampsacus was once again under the king's control. Troxell suggests that the gold coins may have instead been minted by Artabazus, or even an unknown satrap loyal to the king.

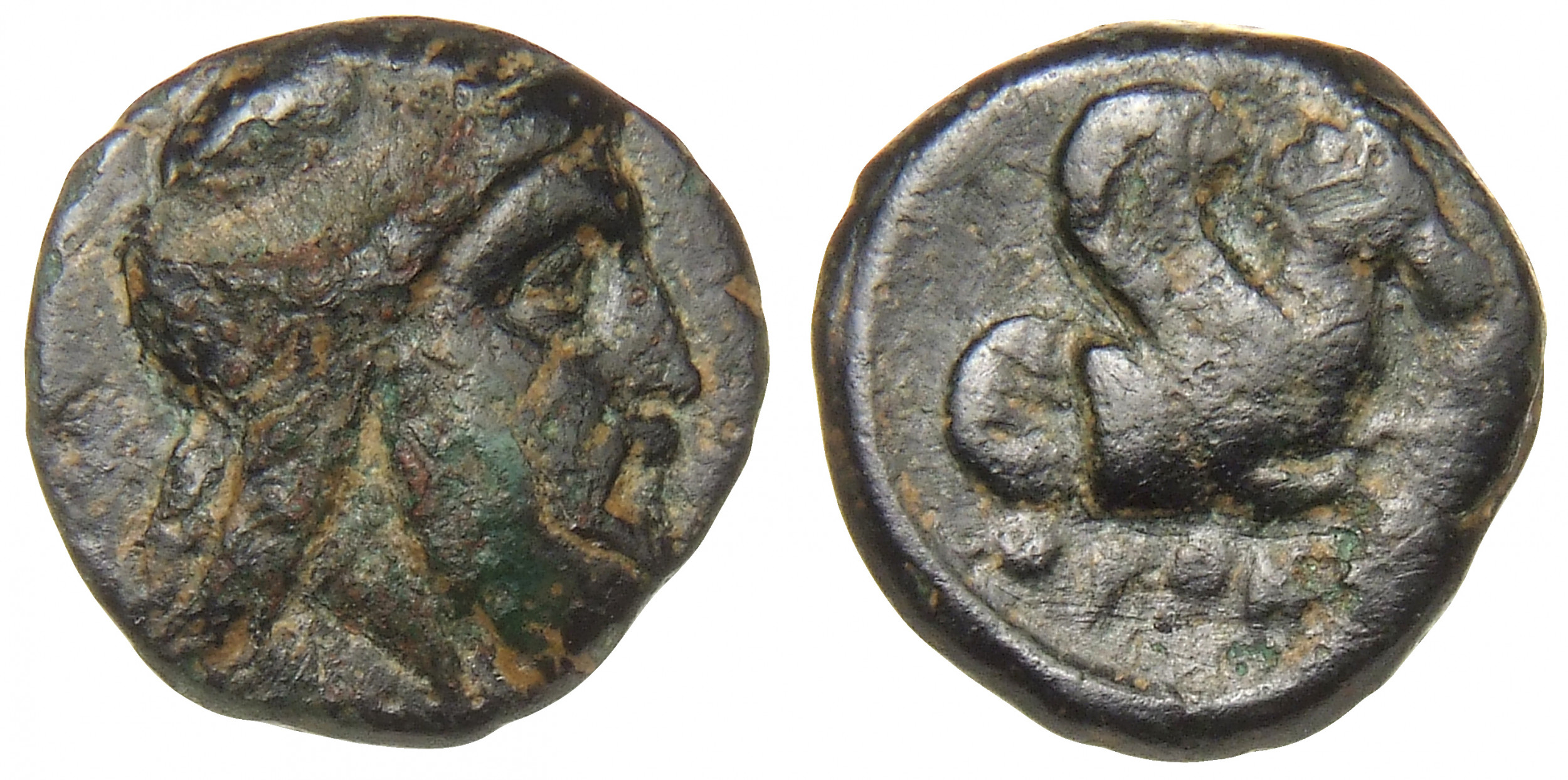
Bronze coin of Orontes I, minted at Adramyteion between 362–348 BC

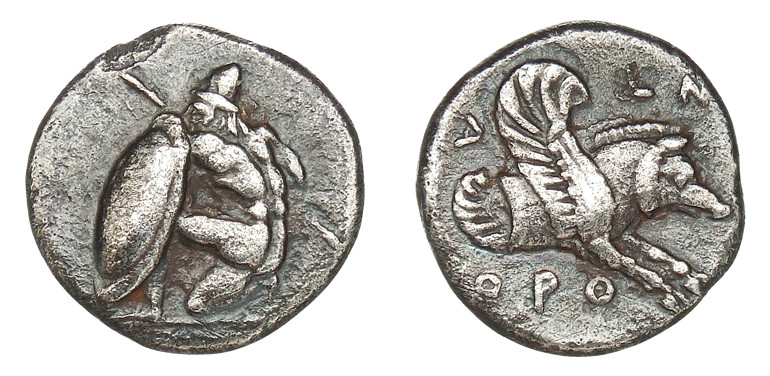
Silver coin of Orontes I, minted at Cisthene between 362–348 BC

== Sources ==
- Boyce, Mary; Grenet, Frantz (1991). Beck, Roger (ed.). A History of Zoroastrianism, Zoroastrianism under Macedonian and Roman Rule. Leiden: Brill. ISBN 978-9004293915.
- Briant, Pierre (2002). From Cyrus to Alexander: A History of the Persian Empire. Eisenbrauns. ISBN 978-1575060316.
- Brijder, Herman (2014). Nemrud Dağı: Recent Archaeological Research and Conservation Activities in the Tomb Sanctuary on Mount Nemrud. Walter de Gruyter. ISBN 978-1-61451-713-9.
- Brosius, Maria (2020). A History of Ancient Persia: The Achaemenid Empire. Wiley-Blackwell. ISBN 978-1-444-35092-0.
- Chahin, M. (2001). The Kingdom of Armenia: A History. Psychology Press. ISBN 978-0700714520.
- Clark, Jessica H.; Turner, Brian (2018). Brill's Companion to Military Defeat in Ancient Mediterranean Society. Brill. ISBN 978-9004298583.
- Dandamaev, Muhammad A. (1989). A Political History of the Achaemenid Empire. Brill. ISBN 978-9004091726.
- Facella, Margherita (2021). "Orontids". In Yarshater, Ehsan (ed.). Encyclopædia Iranica (Online ed.). Encyclopædia Iranica Foundation.
- Gershevitch, Ilya, ed. (1985). The Cambridge History of Iran, Volume 2: The Median and Achaemenian periods. Cambridge University Press. ISBN 978-0521200912.
- Jacobs, Bruno; Rollinger, Robert (2021). A Companion to the Achaemenid Persian Empire. John Wiley & Sons. ISBN 978-1119174288.
- Marek, Christian (2016). In the Land of a Thousand Gods: A History of Asia Minor in the Ancient World. Princeton University Press. ISBN 978-0691159799.
- Osborne, Michael J. (1973). "Orontes". Historia: Zeitschrift für Alte Geschichte. 22 (4): 515–551. ISSN 0018-2311. JSTOR 4435366.
- Osborne, Michael J. (1971). "Athens and Orontes". Annual of the British School at Athens. 66: 297–321. doi:10.1017/S0068245400019213. ISSN 2045-2403. JSTOR 30103238. S2CID 163834297.
- Russell, James R. (1987). Zoroastrianism in Armenia. Harvard University, Department of Near Eastern Languages and Civilizations and National Association for Armenian Studies and Research. ISBN 978-0674968509.
- Ruzicka, Stephen (2012). Trouble in the West: Egypt and the Persian Empire, 525–332 BC. Oxford University Press. pp. 1–311. ISBN 9780199766628.
- Schmitt, Rüdiger (1986). "Armenia and Iran i. Armina, Achaemenid province". In Yarshater, Ehsan (ed.). Encyclopædia Iranica. Vol. II/4: Architecture IV–Armenia and Iran IV. London and New York: Routledge & Kegan Paul. pp. 417–418. ISBN 978-0-71009-104-8.
- Schmitt, Rüdiger (2002). "Orontes". In Yarshater, Ehsan (ed.). Encyclopædia Iranica (Online ed.). Encyclopædia Iranica Foundation.
- Schmitt, Rüdiger (2004). "Hydarnes". In Yarshater, Ehsan (ed.). Encyclopædia Iranica. Vol. XII/6: Human migration II–Illuminationism. London and New York: Routledge & Kegan Paul. pp. 588–590. ISBN 978-0-933273-80-1.
- Shayegan, M. Rahim (2016). "The Arsacids and Commagene". In Curtis, Vesta Sarkhosh; Pendleton, Elizabeth J.; Alram, Michael; Daryaee, Touraj (eds.). The Parthian and Early Sasanian Empires: Adaptation and Expansion. Oxbow Books. ISBN 978-1-78570-208-2.
- Stylianou, P.J. (1998). "Commentary". A Historical Commentary on Diodorus Siculus, Book 15. Oxford University Press. ISBN 978-0-19-815239-2.
- Troxell, Hyla A. (1981). "Orontes, Satrap of Mysia". Schweizerische Numismatische Rundschau. 60: 27–41. ISSN 0035-4163.
