= Mithrenes II =

- High Priest of Armenia
- Reign: 212 – 200 BC
- Dynasty: Orontid dynasty
- Father: Arsames I

Mithrenes (Armenian: Միհրան) is also mentioned as Mithras, High Priest of the temple to the Sun at Armavir. Whether he ever ruled as a king is not known, although later kings such as Tigran were both high priest and king.
