= Orontes I Sakavakyats =

Legendary King of Armenia from 570 to 560 BC

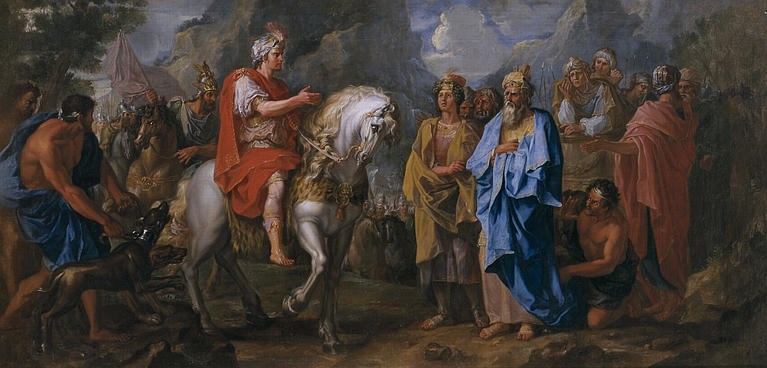
"Cyrus interrogates the king of Armenia", painting by Noël Coypel, Museum of Grenoble.

Orontes I Sakavakyats (Armenian: Երվանդ Ա Սակավակյաց) was a legendary king of Armenia, who was the personification of the Orontid dynasty.

== In historiography ==
Orontes appears in both in the Cyropaedia of the Greek soldier and historian Xenophon (died 354 BC) and the History of Armenia of the 5th-century Armenian historian Movses Khorenatsi (died 490s AD). In the Cyropaedia Orontes is unnamed, whilst in the History of Armenia he is given the name of Orontes.

=== Xenophon ===
According to the Cyropaedia of Xenophon, the unnamed "king of Armenia" had agreed to provide troops and pay yearly tribute to the Median king Astyages after being defeated by him. When Media was invaded by the Chaldaeans during the reign of Astyages' son and successor Cyaxares, the "king of Armenia" refused to help to him as he was obliged. As a result, Cyrus, who was the son of Astyages' daughter Mandana, quickly led an expedition into Armenia. The "king of Armenia" sent his family, including his younger son Sabaris as well as the treasury to the mountains. They were, however, captured by the Persian commander Chrysantas. The Armenians panicked at the approach of Cyrus, who captured their "king". Tigranes, the elder son of the "king" and "who had been Cyrus' companion once on a hunt" returned from a journey abroad and convinced Cyrus to pardon the "king" and reinstall him.

This account by Xenophon, which was not mentioned by Herodotus (died 425 BC), was considered "pure fabrication" by the Iranologist Alireza Shapur Shahbazi. Xenophon was known for creating ancient heroes by basing them on contemporary figures. Tigranes was most likely based on the Persian hyparch Tigranes, who was the son-in-law of Struthas and lived in the same period as Xenophon.

According to Shahbazi, the title of "king of Armenia" should not be taken seriously, as Xenophon also refers to the leader of Hyrcanians and satrap of Bactria as "kings".

=== Movses Khorenatsi ===
The History of Armenia of Movses Khorenatsi was composed to serve as a "national" history of Armenia from the era of the giants to Arsacid rule. According to the book, Eruand (Orontas/Aroandes/Orontes) "the Short-lived" was the father and predecessor of Tigranes.

Scholarship has long agreed that the story is a mixture of history and various legends. Eruand "the Short-lived" was a personification of the Orontid dynasty, the predecessors of the Artaxiad dynasty, whose most distinguished ruler was Tigranes the Great (r. 95–55 BC).

== Sources ==
- Shahbazi, A. Shapur (2017). Badian, Ernst (ed.). "Irano-Hellenic Notes: 1. The Three Faces of Tigranes". American Journal of Ancient History. 2 (2). De Gruyter: 124–136. doi:10.31826/9781463237547-002.
