= Orontid dynasty =

Kings of Armenia and later Sophene and Commagene

- Country: Kingdom of Armenia; Kingdom of Sophene; Kingdom of Commagene
- Founded: 6th century BC (Armenia); 260 BC (Sophene); 163 BC (Commagene)
- Founder: Orontes I Sakavakyats (legendary); Orontes I (historical)
- Current head: Extinct
- Final ruler: Orontes IV (Armenia); Mithrobazane II (Sophene); Antiochus IV (Commagene)
- Titles: King of Greater Armenia
- Dissolution: 200 BC (Armenia); 95 BC (Sophene); 72 AD (Commagene)
- Cadet branches: Artaxiad dynasty (Note: "However, the recent discovery in Armenia of boundary stones with Aramaic inscriptions, in which the ruler Artašēs proclaims himself 'the son of Zareh' and an 'Eruandid king' (Perikhanian, 1966), demonstrates that both 'generals' [Artaxias and Zariadris], far from being Macedonians, belonged in fact to the earlier native dynasty, albeit probably to collateral branches, and that the Eruandids, or Artaxiad/Artašēsids as they came to be known, with their Iranian antecedents, continued to rule Armenia as before. An unexpected corroboration of this dynastic continuity is also provided by Xenophon’s much earlier choice of the name 'Tigranes' for the crown prince of Armenia in his historical romance, the Cyropaedia (Xen., Cyr. 3.1.7). (...) Except for the occasional princes imposed by the Romans, none of whom succeeded in consolidating himself on the throne, all the dynasties to rule pre-Islamic Armenia were of Iranian stock."); Artsruni dynasty Bagratuni dynasty (potentially); Gnuni dynasty

The Orontid dynasty, also known as the Eruandids or Eruandunis, ruled the Satrapy of Armenia until 330 BC and the Kingdom of Armenia from 321 BC to 200 BC. The Orontids ruled first as client kings or satraps of the Achaemenid Empire and after the collapse of the Achaemenid Empire established an independent kingdom. Later, a branch of the Orontids ruled as kings of Sophene and Commagene. They are the first of the three royal dynasties that successively ruled the ancient Kingdom of Armenia (321 BC–428 AD). Although the overthrow of Orontes IV and the accession of Artaxias I to the throne of Armenia in the early 2nd century BC is traditionally treated as the start of a new dynasty, Artaxias probably belonged to a branch of the Orontid dynasty. His descendants ruled Armenia until the 1st century AD.

== Historical background ==
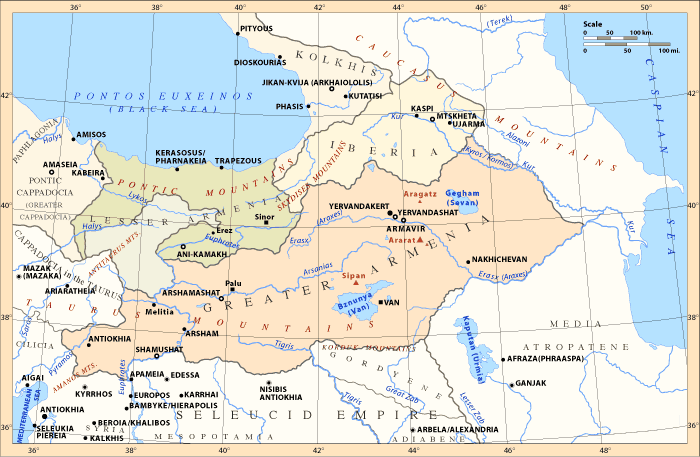
The Satrapy of Armenia under the Orontid dynasty.

Most historians state that the Orontids were of Iranian origin, and suggest that it held dynastic familial linkages to the ruling Achaemenid dynasty. Throughout their existence, the Orontids stressed their lineage from the Achaemenids in order to strengthen their political legitimacy. Their presence in Armenia is traced back to Orontes I, Satrap of Armenia in 401 BC, or further back to his ancestor Hydarnes, in the last quarter of the 6th century BC (see below). (Note: J.R. Russell states, "According to Strabo, the Orontids traced their descent from Aroandes, whose ancestor was Hydarnes, one of the companions of Darius I and the head of one of the seven great noble clans of the Persians.")

Other historians state the Orontids were of Armenian origin, while according to Razmik Panossian, the Orontids probably had marriage links to the rulers of Persia and other leading noble houses in Armenia, and states their Armenian ethnicity is uncertain. Soviet Armenian historian Suren Yeremian writes that the Orontids were an Armenian dynasty based in the area around Lake Van, the former center of the Kingdom of Urartu. (Note: He cites as evidence a number of placenames in the area containing the name Eruand (the Armenian equivalent of Orontes); for example, the district of Hayots Dzor south of Lake Van was also known as Aruantunik or Eruandunik, and in some medieval Armenian sources the city of Van (the old Urartian capital Tushpa) is called Eruandavan.) He argues that the Orontids established their rule in the Urartian capital Tushpa in the 6th century BC, as that kingdom was collapsing. They expanded to other parts of Armenia to form the first Armenian kingdom. Per Yeremian, the Orontids originally came from the vicinity of Musasir (in modern-day northern Iraq), (Note: Yeremian cites as evidence a passage from Pliny the Elder's Natural History (6.30) in which a tribe called the Orontes, who live east of Gaugamela, are mentioned.) but because of the forced relocation policies of the Urartians, they came to form an Armenian enclave in the Hurro-Urartian-populated region around Lake Van.

The name Orontes is the Hellenized form of a masculine name of Iranian origin, rendered Eruand (Երուանդ) in Old Armenian (Yervand in Modern Armenian). The name is only attested in Greek (Gr.:Ὀρόντης). Its cognates are Avestan Auruuant ('brave, hero') and Middle Persian Arwand (Modern Persian Arvand). Various Greek versions of the name appear in classical sources, such as Orontas, Aroandes and Oruandes.

== Language ==
Despite Alexander the Great's invasion of Persia, Persian and local Armenian culture remained the strongest element within society and the elites. The imperial administration used Aramaic, where it was used in official documents for centuries. Whereas most inscriptions used Old Persian cuneiform. Xenophon used an interpreter to speak to Armenians, while some Armenian villages were conversant in Persian.

The Greek inscriptions at Armavir indicate that the upper classes used Greek as one of their languages. Under Ervand the Last (r. ca. 210–200 BC), the structure of government had begun to resemble Greek institutions, and Greek was used as the language of the royal court. Ervand had surrounded himself by the Hellenized nobility and sponsored the establishment of a Greek school in Armavir, the capital of the Ervanduni kingdom.

== Religion ==
While there is no direct evidence of the Orontids' religion prior to Antiochus I of Commagene, their Iranian background and connection to the Achaemenid dynasty make it highly plausible that they followed some form of Zoroastrianism. James R. Russell contends the Armenians likely embraced Zoroastrianism during the Achaemenid era while integrating it with regional traditions.

== Orontid satraps and kings of Armenia ==
Orontid Armenia in 250 BC

Information about the Orontids is fragmentary, and historians' reconstruction of their history and genealogy is tentative and mainly based on evidence from inscriptions and coins. In particular, the inscriptions left by the Orontid king Antiochus I of Commagene (r. 70–31 BC) at Mount Nemrut contain the most information about the genealogy of the Orontids. Their presence as a ruling dynasty in Armenia can be traced back to at least 400 BC, at which time Orontes I appears as the Satrap of Armenia under the Achaemenid Empire.

In his largely fictional Cyropaedia, the Greek author Xenophon (died c. 354/355 BC) mentions Tigranes, the son of an unnamed king of Armenia, who was a friend of Cyrus the Great (r. 550–530 BC), the founder of the Achaemenid Empire. Tigranes was the name of later Armenian monarchs of the Artaxiad dynasty (probably a branch of the Orontids). The later Armenian historian Movses Khorenatsi, possibly drawing from a common tradition as Xenophon, writes of an Armenian king named Tigran (Tigranes), the son of King Eruand (Orontes) the Short-Lived. (Note: In Khorenatsi's history, these are members of the line of Armenian kings going back to the legendary progenitor of the Armenian people, Hayk.) Khorenatsi's Tigran allies with Cyrus the Great against the Median king Astyages. According to A. Shapour Shahbazi, Xenophon's account of Tigranes is fictional, and Xenophon based Tigranes on a contemporary of the same name who was a son-in-law of the Achaemenid satrap Struthas. Suren Yeremian used Xenophon's and Khorenatsi's accounts to argue that Eruand the Short-Lived and his son Tigran were actual Orontid kings of Armenia in the 6th century BC. In Cyril Toumanoff's view, the succession of Tigran after Eruand in Khorenatsi's version allegorically represents the Artaxiad dynasty succeeding the Orontids. Commenting on Khorenatsi's account, Igor M. Diakonoff did not rule out that the Orontids had married into a pre-existing Armenian royal house.

Xenophon's contemporary Orontes I, satrap of Armenia, is regarded as the ancestor of the later Orontid rulers; it is possible that the Orontids were already established in Armenia before him. Orontes was the son of a Bactrian nobleman, Artasyrus, and claimed descent from Hydarnes, presumably through the maternal line. Hydarnes was one of the "Seven Persians" who overthrew Bardiya and placed Darius the Great on the Achaemenid throne in 522 BC. After Darius's takeover, Armenia revolted and was subdued after three Persian campaigns, led by the Armenian Dadarshish. Hydarnes may have been granted the Satrapy of Armenia as a quasi-hereditary office. A later Hydarnes, who married his daughter to Artaxerxes II (r. 405/404–359/358 BC), may have been a descendant of the first Hydarnes and served as Satrap of Armenia. In 401 BC, Orontes I appears as the Satrap of Armenia and the son-in-law of Artaxerxes II, having married the latter's daughter Rhodogune. This Orontes is frequently mentioned in accounts of Persian affairs in the first half of the 4th century BC. He fought against the Ten Thousand Greeks during their escape through Armenia. At this time, Armenia was organized into two satrapies, divided by the Teleboas River: one ruled by Orontes, and another, distinguished as "Western" Armenia, ruled by Tiribazus. Orontes led the Persian infantry against Evagoras, the King of Salamis on Cyprus, after which he lost Artaxerxes's favor. He later reappears as the subordinate governor of a coastal province. He led revolt against the king but ultimately made peace with him. He died c. 344 BC.

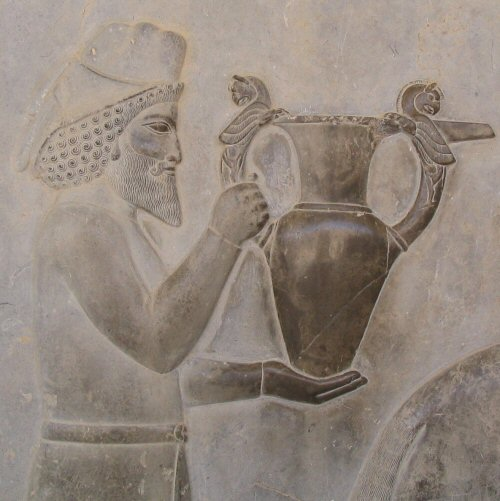
An Armenian tribute bearer carrying a metal vessel with griffin handles. 5th century BC.

During the reign of Artaxerxes III, the Satrapy of Armenia was granted to Artashata, a member of the Achaemenid dynasty who later ruled the empire as Darius III. The next known Orontid satrap of Armenia is Orontes II, a son or grandson of Orontes I. He led the Armenian contingent in Darius III's army at the Battle of Gaugamela. Another Armenian commander is mentioned is mentioned in this context, Mithraustes, who may have been the satrap of another part of Armenia. After conquering the Achaemenid Empire, Alexander the Great appointed as Satrap of Armenia Mithrenes, a satrap of Sardis who had defected to his side. Some historians doubt whether Mithrenes ever actually ruled in Armenia, as the Macedonians never established firm control over the country. In Cyril Toumanoff's view, Mithrenes was actually a member of the Orontid dynasty. The Mount Nemrut inscriptions bear a partially legible name following that of Orontes II, which one scholar read as Mithranes. More recent studies have identified the name as ending in -danes (perhaps Bardanes), referring to a son of Orontes II. An Orontes (III) is mentioned by Diodorus Siculus as ruling Armenia in about 316 BC. The Macedonian general Neoptolemus is mentioned as Satrap of Armenia not long after the death of Alexander the Great, but he seems to have failed to take control of the country, possibly because of Orontes's resistance. Diodorus also refers to Ardoates, whom he calls King of Armenia, and who helped Ariarathes II of Cappadocia break away from the Seleucids. This probably happened after the Battle of Corupedium. According to Toumanoff, this "Ardoates" is identical with Orontes III. Regardless of their formal submission to more powerful rulers, the Orontids ruled as kings in practice and presented themselves as kings.

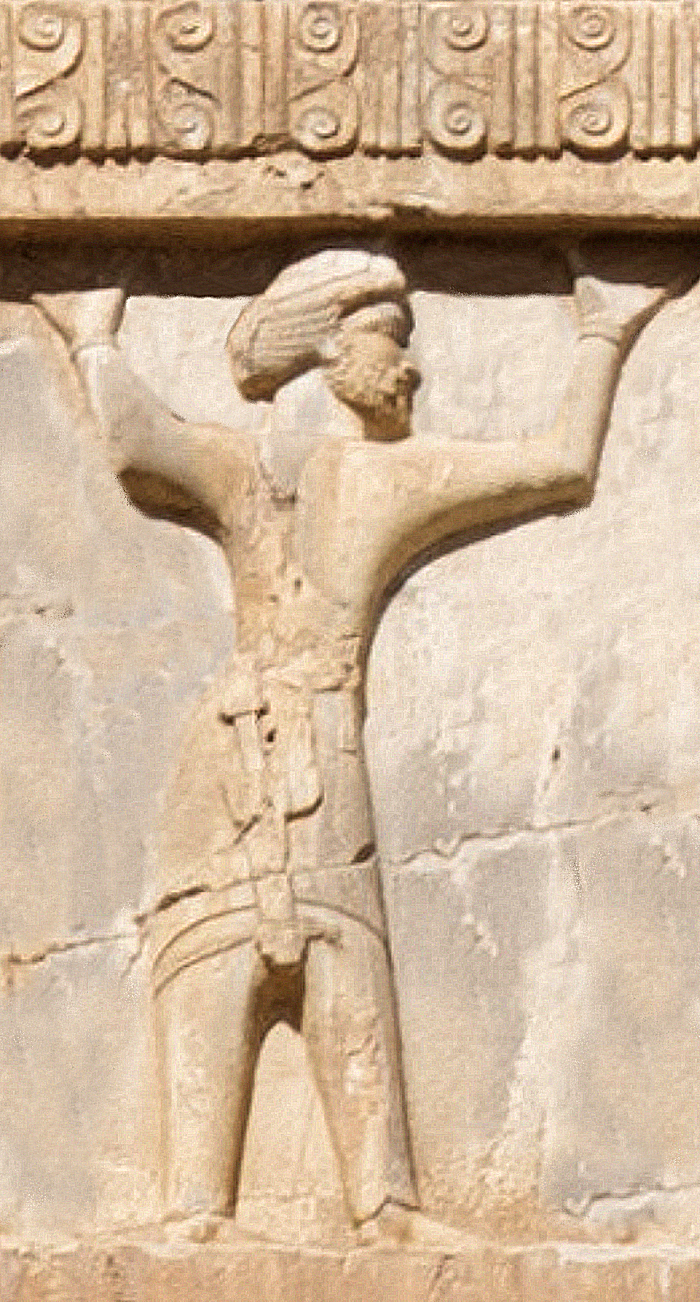
Armenian soldier of the Achaemenid army, circa 470 BC. Xerxes I tomb relief.

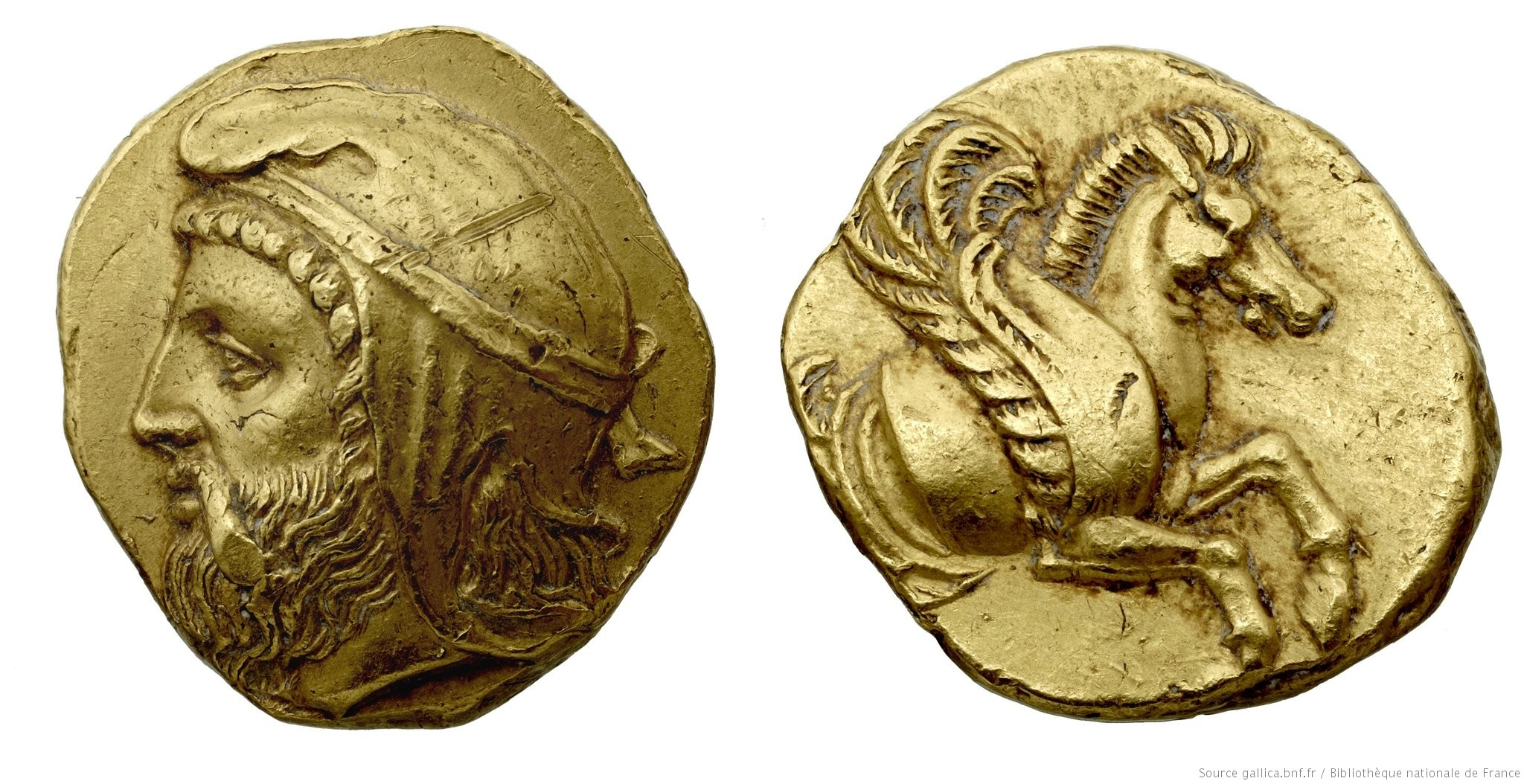
Gold coin of Orontes I held at the National Library, Paris, dated to 362 BC.

Starting from 301 BC Armenia is included within the sphere of influence of the Seleucid Empire, but it maintained a considerable degree of autonomy, retaining its native rulers. According to Polyaenus, in 227 BC the Seleucid rebel king Antiochus Hierax took refuge in Armenian territory governed by King Arsames, founder of the city Arsamosata. Towards the end of 212 BC the country was divided into two kingdoms, both vassal states of the Seleucids: Greater Armenia and Armenia Sophene, including Commagene or Armenia Minor. Antiochus III the Great decided to suppress the local dynasties, and besieged Arsamosata. Xerxes, the satrap of Sophene and Commagene, surrendered and implored the clemency of the king, whom he accepted as his sovereign. Antiochus gave his sister Antiochis as a wife to Xerxes; she would later murder him. Greater Armenia was ruled by an Orontid descendant of Hydarnes, the last Orontid ruler of Greater Armenia (Strabo xi.14.15); he was apparently subdued by Antiochus III the Great, who then divided the land between his generals Artaxias (Artashes) and Zariadres (Zareh), both of whom would claim descent from the Orontid family.

== Orontids of Commagene ==
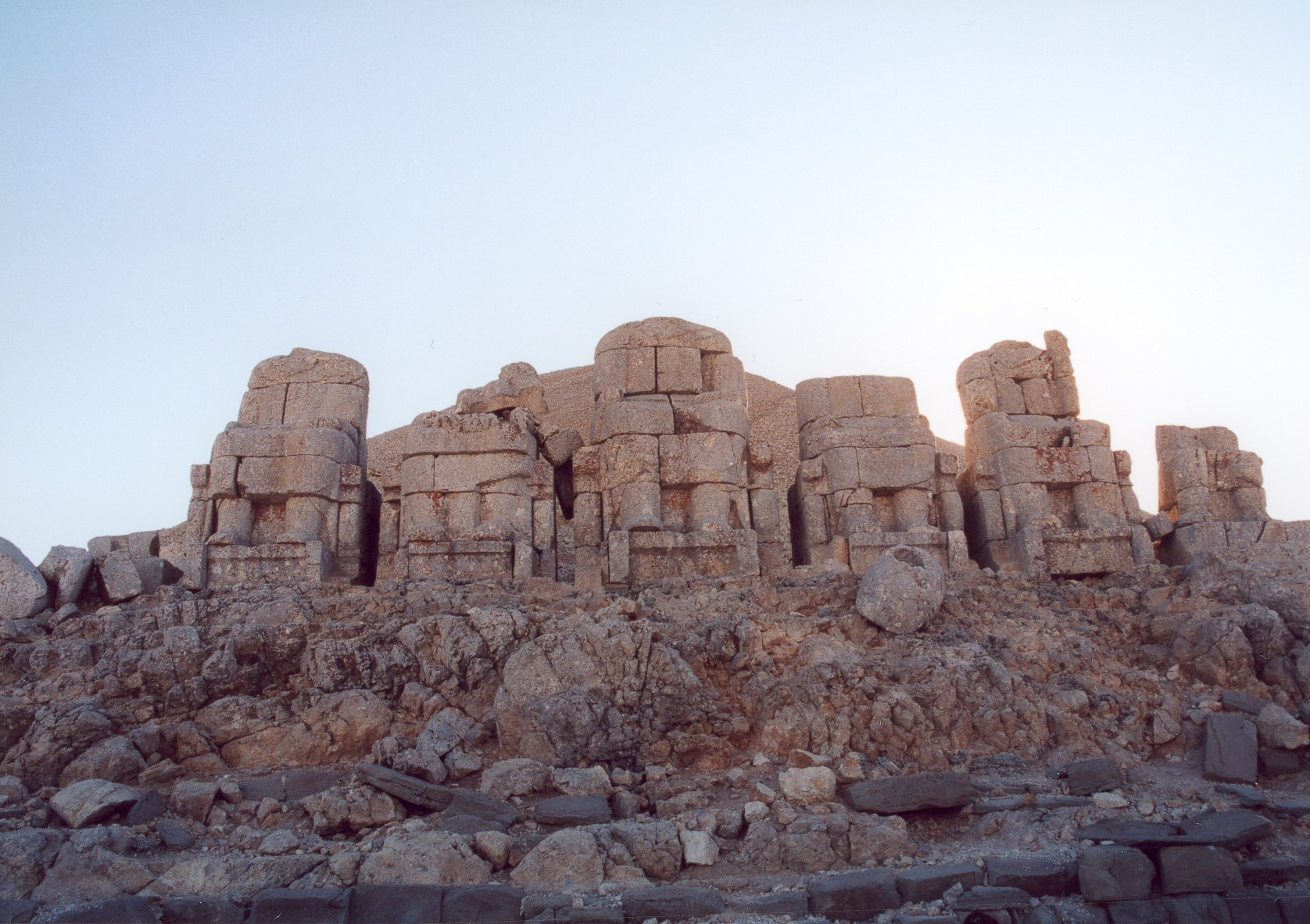
Nemrut Dağı, Statues at East Terrace

In Nemrut Dagi, opposite the statues of Gods there are a long row of pedestals, on which stood the steles of the Greek ancestors of Antiochos. At a right angle to this row stood another row of steles, depicting his Orontid and Achaemenid ancestors. From these steles the ones of Darius and Xerxes are well preserved. In front of each stele is a small altar. Inscriptions have been found on two of those altars. Antiochos expended great effort to ensure that everyone was aware that he was related to the dynasty of the King of Kings, Darius I, by the marriage of princess Rhodogune to his ancestor Orontes. The father of Rhodogune was the Persian king, Artaxerxes. In 401 BC Artaxerxes defeated his younger brother, who tried to depose him. Because of the help Artaxerxes received from Orontes—his military commander and satrap of Armenia—he gave his daughter in marriage to him. Their descendant, the Orontid Mithridates I Callinicus married Seleucid Princess Laodice VII Thea.

== Genealogy ==
Family tree of the Orontid dynasty according to Cyril Toumanoff:

Bagabigna
Hydarnes I Persian nobleman (521)	Sisamnes
Hydarnes II chiliarch of Iran (480–428)	Sisamnes (480)	Otanes
Hydarnes III; Satrap of Armenia († 410)	Orontes	?	Gobryas gouv. of Akkad
Amestris; Daughter of Darius II	Teritouchmes; Satrap of Armenia († 410)	Roxane († 410)	Tissaphernes satrap of Sardes († 396)	several princes and princesses executed in 410	Stateira († 400) ep. Artaxerxes II	Artasyrus satrap of Hyrcany
a prince († 404)	Mazeus satrap of Babylone († 328)	Rhodogune	Orontes I satrap of Armenia (401–361)
Hydarnes satrap of Ionie (ca.334)	Orontes II satrap of Armenia (361–331)
Mithrenes king of Armenia (331-ca.317)
Orontes III king of Armenia (ca.317-ca.260)
Sames I king of Armenia (ca.260)
Arsames I king of Armenia (ap.260-ap.228)

== Orontid kings in Armenian tradition ==
In the Armenian tradition recorded by Movses Khorenatsi, Eruand (Orontes) the Short-Lived is one of the kings in the line of the legendary Armenian patriarch Hayk, separated from the latter by 43 generations. He is made a contemporary of Cyrus the Great, and Khorenatsi's account of Tigran, son of Eruand, helping Cyrus against the Medes may derive from the same tradition as Xenophon's account of Tigranes, a companion of Cyrus. Starting with Eruand, Khorenatsi lists the following succession:

- Eruand the Short-Lived
- Tigran
- Vahagn (Khorenatsi believed that this Armenian god was a deified king)
- Aravan (possibly another version of the name Orontes)
- Nerseh
- Zareh (equivalent to Zariadres)
- Armog
- Bagan
- Van
- Vahe, died fighting Alexander the Great; end of the Haykid line.

Memory of the real conflict between the Orontid king Orontes IV and Artaxias I is also preserved in Khorenatsi's account of Artashes, a member of the royal family, overthrowing King Eruand. Khorenatsi makes Eruand and Artashes members of the Arsacid dynasty and contemporaries of the Roman emperors Vespasian and Titus (1st century AD).

== Kings and satraps ==
(Note: Some dates are approximate or doubtful).

- Orontes (401–344 BC)
- Darius Codomannus (non-dynastic) (344–336 BC)
- Orontes II (336–331 BC)
- Mithranes (331–323 BC)
- Perdiccas (non-dynastic) (323 BC)
- Neoptolemus (non-dynastic) (323–321 BC)
- Eumenes (non-dynastic) (321 BC)
- Mihran (321–317 BC)
- Orontes III (317–260 BC)
- Sames of Sophene (Armenia and Sophene c. 260 BC, unknown previous tenure as Satrap of Sophene)
- Arsames I (260–228 BC) (Armenia, Sophene, and Commagene)
- Charaspes (doubtful)
- Arsames II (Sophene c. 230 BC, possibly same person as Arsames I)
- Xerxes (228–212 BC) (Sophene and Commagene)
- Abdissares (212–200 BC) (Sophene and Commagene)
- Orontes IV (228–200 BC) (Armenia)
- Ptolemaeus (201 BC–163 BC) (Commagene)
- Seleucid rule (200–189 BC)
- Artaxiad rule (189–163 BC)

== Orontid kings of Commagene ==
- Ptolemaeus 163–130 BC
- Sames II Theosebes Dikaios 130–109 BC
- Mithridates I Callinicus 109–70 BC
- Antiochus I Theos 70–38 BC
- Mithridates II 38–20 BC
- Mithridates III 20–12 BC
- Antiochus III 12 BC–17 AD
- Ruled by Rome 17–38 AD
- Antiochus IV 38–72 AD and wife, Iotapa

== See also ==
- List of rulers of Commagene

== Sources ==
- Adontz, Nicholas (1970). Armenia in the Period of Justinian: The Political Conditions Based on the Naxarar System. Translated by Nina G. Garsoïan. Lisbon: Calouste Gulbenkian Foundation.
- Bournoutian, George (1995). A History of the Armenian People: Pre-history to 1500 A.D. ISBN 978-0-939214-96-9.
- Brijder, Herman (2014). Nemrud Dağı: Recent Archaeological Research and Conservation Activities in the Tomb Sanctuary on Mount Nemrud. Walter de Gruyter. ISBN 978-1-61451-713-9.
- Maranci, Christina (2018). The Art of Armenia: An Introduction. Oxford University Press. p. 21. ISBN 978-0-19-093588-7.
- Adrych, Philippa; Bracey, Robert; Dalglish, Dominic; Lenk, Stefanie; Wood, Rachel (2017). Elsner, Jaś (ed.). Images of Mithra. Oxford University Press. ISBN 9780192511119.
- Allsen, Thomas T. (2011). The Royal Hunt in Eurasian History. University of Pennsylvania Press. p. 37. ISBN 978-0812201079.
- Bournoutian, George (2006). A Concise History of the Armenian People. California: Mazda Publishers, Inc. p. 23. ISBN 1-56859-141-1. "Aramaic, the language of the imperial administration, was introduced into Armenia, where, for centuries, it continued to be used in official documents. Old Persian cuneiform, meanwhile, was used in most inscriptions. Xenophon mentions that he used a Persian interpreter to converse with Armenians and in some Armenian villages they responded in Persian."
- Canepa, Matthew (2010). "Achaemenid and Seleukid Royal Funerary Practices and Middle Iranian Kingship". In Börm, H.; Wiesehöfer, J. (eds.). Commutatio et Contentio. Studies in the Late Roman, Sasanian, and Early Islamic Near East in Memory of Zeev Rubin. pp. 1–21.
- Canepa, Matthew P. (2015). "Dynastic Sanctuaries and the Transformation of Iranian Kingship between Alexander and Islam". In Babaie, Sussan; Grigor, Talinn (eds.). Persian Kingship and Architecture: Strategies of Power in Iran from the Achaemenids to the Pahlavis. I.B.Tauris. p. 80. ISBN 978-1848857513. "Iranian culture deeply influenced Armenia, and Iranian dynasties ruled Armenia during several important periods, including the Orontids (c. sixth century - c. early second century BCE) and Arsacids (54-428 CE)."
- Chaumont, M. L. (1986). "Armenia and Iran ii. The pre-Islamic period". In Yarshater, Ehsan (ed.). Encyclopædia Iranica. Vol. II/4: Architecture IV–Armenia and Iran IV (Online ed.). Encyclopædia Iranica Foundation. pp. 418–438.
- Diakonoff, I. M. (1984). The Pre-History of the Armenian People. Delmar, N.Y.: Caravan Books. ISBN 9780882060392.
- Dörner, F.K.; Young, J.H. (1996). "Sculpture and inscription catalogue". In Donald H. Sanders (ed.). Nemrud Daği: The Hierothesion of Antiochus I of Commagene. Vol. 1: Text. Eisenbrauns. p. 297. ISBN 978-1-57506-015-6.
- Facella, Margherita (2021). "Orontids". In Yarshater, Ehsan (ed.). Encyclopædia Iranica (Online ed.). Encyclopædia Iranica Foundation.
- Gaggero, Gianfranco (2016). "Armenians in Xenophon". Greek Texts and Armenian Traditions: An Interdisciplinary Approach. De Gruyter. "The above mentioned Orontids..[..]..but also because the two satraps who were contemporaries of Xenophon's are explicitly stated to be Persian."
- Garsoïan, Nina (2004). "Armeno-Iranian relations in the pre-Islamic period". In Yarshater, Ehsan (ed.). Encyclopædia Iranica (Online ed.). Encyclopædia Iranica Foundation.
- Garsoïan, N. (2005). "Tigran II". In Yarshater, Ehsan (ed.). Encyclopædia Iranica (Online ed.). Encyclopædia Iranica Foundation. "Tigran (Tigranes) II was the most distinguished member of the so-called Artašēsid/Artaxiad dynasty, which has now been identified as a branch of the earlier Eruandid [Orontid] dynasty of Iranian origin attested as ruling in Armenia from at least the 5th century B.C.E."
- Ghafurov, Bobojon (1971). История иранского государства и культуры [History of the Iranian State and Culture] (PDF) (in Russian). Moscow: Nauka: Chief Editorial Office of Eastern Literature. OCLC 8240688.
- Garsoïan, Nina (1997). "The Emergence of Armenia". In Hovannisian, Richard G. (ed.). The Armenian People from Ancient to Modern Times. Vol. I: The Dynastic Periods: From Antiquity to the Fourteenth Century. New York: St. Martin's Press. pp. 37–62. ISBN 0-312-10169-4. "..but the existence of a local Armenian dynasty, probably of Iranian origin.."
- Jacobs, Bruno (2006). "Achaemenid Satrapies". In Yarshater, Ehsan (ed.). Encyclopædia Iranica (Online ed.). Encyclopædia Iranica Foundation.
- Jacobs, Bruno; Rollinger, Robert (2021). A Companion to the Achaemenid Persian Empire. John Wiley & Sons. ISBN 978-1119174288.
- Kouymjian, Dickran (2019). "Illustrations of the Armenian Alexander Romance and Motifs from Christian Iconography". In Bläsing, Uwe; Dum-Tragut, Jasmine; van Lint, Theo Maarten (eds.). Armenian, Hittite, and Indo-European Studies: A Commemoration Volume for Jos J.S. Weitenberg. Peeters. pp. 149–182. "The Orontid kings of Armenia were descended from the Achaemenid line.."
- Lang, David M. (2000). "Iran, Armenia and Georgia". In Yarshater, Ehsan (ed.). The Cambridge History of Iran, Volume 3: The Seleucid, Parthian and Sasanid Periods. Cambridge University Press. p. 535. ISBN 0-521-20092-X. "The most striking example of the syncretism of gods in ancient Parthia actually occurs in a former Armenian satellite kingdom, namely Commagene, the modern Malatya district. Here a scion of the Armenian Orontid house, King Antiochus I (69 — 38 B.C.) built himself a funeral hill at Nimrud Dagh.(..) We see the king's paternal ancestors, traced back to the Achaemenian monarch Darius, son of Hystaspes, while Greek inscriptions record the dead ruler's connections with the Armenian dynasty of the Orontids."
- Manandian, Hagop (1965). The Trade and Cities of Armenia in Relation to Ancient World Trade. Armenian library of the Calouste Gulbenkian Foundation. p. 37.
- Moses Khorenatsʻi (2006) [Orig. published 1978]. History of the Armenians. Translation and commentary by Robert W. Thomson (Revised ed.). Ann Arbor: Caravan Books. ISBN 978-0-88206-111-5.
- Nichols, Andrew G. (2016). "The Iranian Concept Asa and Greek views of the Persians". Studi Classici e Orientali. 62: 61–86.
- Osborne, Michael J. (1973). "Orontes". Historia: Zeitschrift für Alte Geschichte. 22 (4): 515–551. ISSN 0018-2311. JSTOR 4435366.
- Panossian, Razmik (2006). The Armenians From Kings and Priests to Merchants and Commissars. United Kingdom: Columbia University Press. pp. 35. ISBN 9781850657880. "It is not known whether the Yervandunis were ethnically Armenian. They probably had marriage links to the rulers of Persia and other leading noble houses in Armenia."
- Payaslian, Simon (2007). The History of Armenia: From the Origins to the Present (1st ed.). New York: Palgrave Macmillan. pp. 8–9. ISBN 978-1403974679.
- Russell, J. R. (1986). "Armenia and Iran iii. Armenian Religion". In Yarshater, Ehsan (ed.). Encyclopædia Iranica. Vol. II/4: Architecture IV–Armenia and Iran IV (Online ed.). Encyclopædia Iranica Foundation. pp. 438–444. "Iran, however, was to be the dominant influence in Armenian spiritual culture. The Orontid, Artaxiad, and Arsacid dynasties were all Iranian in origin, and the greater part of the Armenian vocabulary consists of Mid. Ir. loanwords. The Armenians preserved strong regional traditions which appear to have been incorporated into Zoroastrianism, a religion adopted by them probably in the Achaemenid period."
- Russell, James (1987). Frye, Richard N. (ed.). Zoroastrianism in Armenia. Harvard University Press. ISBN 0-674-96850-6.
- Russell, James (1997). "The Formation of the Armenian Nation". The Armenian People from Ancient to Modern Times. Vol. I: The Dynastic Periods: From Antiquity to the Fourteenth Century. New York: St. Martin's Press. pp. 19–36. ISBN 0-312-10169-4.
- Sartre, Maurice (2005). The Middle East Under Rome. Harvard University Press. p. 23. ISBN 978-0674016835. "The Commagene kings claimed to be descended from the Orontids, a powerful Iranian family that had ruled the area during the Achaemenid period. They were related to the Achaemenids who had built a kingdom (...)"
- Schmitt, Rüdiger (2004). "Hydarnes". In Yarshater, Ehsan (ed.). Encyclopædia Iranica. Vol. XII/6: Human migration II–Illuminationism (Online ed.). Encyclopædia Iranica Foundation. pp. 588–590.
- Schmitt, Rüdiger (2002). "Orontes". In Yarshater, Ehsan (ed.). Encyclopædia Iranica (Online ed.). Encyclopædia Iranica Foundation.
- Shahbazi, A. Shapur (2017). Badian, Ernst (ed.). "Irano-Hellenic Notes: 1. The Three Faces of Tigranes". American Journal of Ancient History. 2 (2). De Gruyter: 124–136. doi:10.31826/9781463237547-002.
- Toumanoff, Cyril (1961). "Introduction to Christian Caucasian History: II: States and Dynasties of the Formative Period". Traditio. 17. Cambridge University Press: 1–106. doi:10.1017/S0362152900008473. JSTOR 27830424. S2CID 151524770.
- Toumanoff, Cyril (1963). Studies in Christian Caucasian History. Washington D.C.: Georgetown University Press. p. 278. "The eponym's praenomen Orontes is as Iranian as the dynasty itself."
- Yarshater, Ehsan, ed. (1994). "Darius v. Darius III". Encyclopædia Iranica. Vol. VI/1: Coffeehouse–Communism IV (Online ed.). Encyclopædia Iranica Foundation. pp. 51–54.
- Yeremian, Suren (1971). "Hay zhoghovrdi kazmavorman avartě ev haykakan aṛajin petakan kazmavorumnerě" Հայ ժողովրդի կազմավորման ավարտը և հայկական առաջին պետական կազմավորումները [The completion of the formation of the Armenian people and the first Armenian state formations]. In Yeremian, Suren; et al. (eds.). Hay zhoghovrdi patmutʻyun Հայ ժողովրդի պատմություն [History of the Armenian People] (in Armenian). Vol. 1. Erevan: Armenian SSR Academy of Sciences. pp. 423–443.
- Young, J. H. (1996). Donald H. Sanders (ed.). Nemrud Daği: The Hierothesion of Antiochus I of Commagene. Vol. 1: Text. Eisenbrauns. ISBN 978-1-57506-015-6.
