= Artasyrus =

Bactrian nobleman

Artasyrus (also spelled Artasouras; Old Iranian: Arta-sūra) was a Bactrian nobleman in the Achaemenid Empire, who was the father of Orontes I (died 344 BC), the satrap of the Armenia and ancestor of the Orontid dynasty. The career of Artasyrus is obscure. According to the Greek historian Plutarch, he held the high-ranking office of the "King's Eye". He has been suggested to be the same person as the namesake Iranian noble who participated in the Battle of Cunaxa in 401 BC. He and Orontes I are the only Bactrians who are known to have occupied high offices under the Achaemenid Empire. Bactrians that settled in other parts of the empire either did so by their own will or as garrison-colonists.

== Sources ==
- Boyce, Mary; Grenet, Frantz (1991). Beck, Roger (ed.). A History of Zoroastrianism, Zoroastrianism under Macedonian and Roman Rule. Leiden: Brill. ISBN 978-9004293915.
- Briant, Pierre (2002). From Cyrus to Alexander: A History of the Persian Empire. Eisenbrauns. ISBN 978-1575060316.
- Facella, Margherita (2021). "Orontids". In Yarshater, Ehsan (ed.). Encyclopædia Iranica (Online ed.). Encyclopædia Iranica Foundation.
- Osborne, Michael J. (1973). "Orontes". Historia: Zeitschrift für Alte Geschichte. 22 (4): 515–551. ISSN 0018-2311. JSTOR 4435366.
- Schmitt, Rüdiger (2002). "Orontes". In Yarshater, Ehsan (ed.). Encyclopædia Iranica (Online ed.). Encyclopædia Iranica Foundation.
