= Mithridates (nephew of Antiochus III) =

King of Sophene and Commagene from 228 to 212 BC

Mithridates (also spelled Mithradates; fl. 2nd century BC) was a prince connected to the Seleucid royal house, son of a sister of the Seleucid king Antiochus III the Great. He is attested in Polybius 8.23.3–5 and possibly also in Polybius 25.2.11.

== Biography ==
The only certain ancient reference to Mithridates occurs in 212 BC, when Antiochus III besieged Arsamosata in Sophene. Some of the king's advisors proposed installing Mithridates, the king's nephew, as ruler of Sophene in place of the young rebel king Xerxes. Antiochus declined, reconciling instead with Xerxes and giving him his sister Antiochis as wife.

If the identification with the figure in Polybius 25.2.11 is accepted, Mithridates was also involved in the Anatolian war of 183-79 BC, fighting alongside Pharnaces I of Pontus and attacking Ariarathes IV of Cappadocia, for which he was fined three hundred talents in the subsequent peace settlement.
