= Arsames II =

King of Sophene from 230 to 220 BC

- King
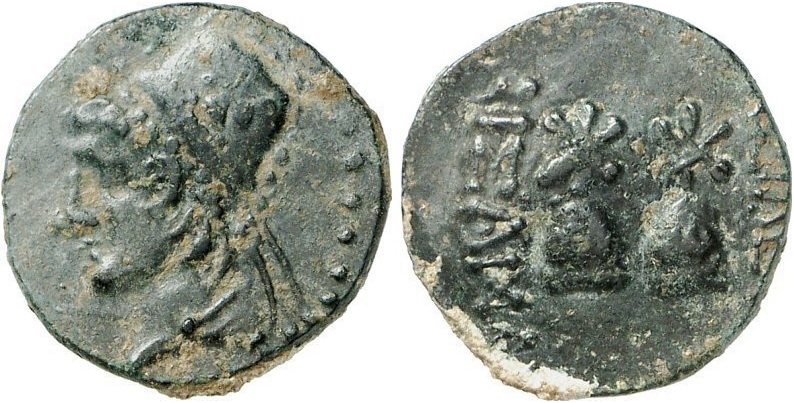
- Coin of Arsames II, 230 BCE
- Reign: 230–220 BCE
- Predecessor: Arsames I
- Successor: Xerxes
- Dynasty: Orontid
- Father: Arsames I

Arsames II was the King of Armenian kingdom of Sophene, the son of Arsames I.

Arsames II reigned from 230–220 BCE and offered asylum to Antiochus Hierax, the rebellious brother of the Seleucid king, Seleucus II.

Cyril Toumanoff considered Arsames II to be the same person as Arsames I.
