= Mithrenes =

Satrap of Armenia from 331 to 321 BC

Mithrenes I

Satrap of Armenia; King of Armenia
- Reign: 331 BC – 321?
- Coronation: 331 BC
- Predecessor: Orontes II
- Successor: Orontes III
- Issue: Orontes III?
Names
- Mithrenes
- Dynasty: Orontid dynasty?
- Father: Orontes II?

Mithrenes (Greek: Mιθρένης or Mιθρίνης) was a Persian commander of the force that garrisoned the citadel of Sardis. According to Cyril Toumanoff, he was also a member of the Orontid dynasty, of Iranian origin. Waldemar Heckel, on the other hand, considers Mithrenes to be a Persian noble of unknown family background.

== Appointment as satrap of Armenia ==
After the battle of the Granicus Mithrenes surrendered voluntarily to Alexander the Great, and was treated by him with great distinction. Mithrenes was present in the Macedonian camp after the Battle of Issus, and Alexander ordered him to visit the captured family of Darius III and assure them that Darius was alive, before changing his mind and assigning the duty to Leonnatus instead. He fought for Alexander at Gaugamela, and ironically he was fighting against an army that included his father Orontes II. Afterwards, Alexander appointed him Satrap of Armenia.

Mithrenes disappears from the historical record after this appointment, and his ultimate fate is unknown. It's not clear whether he actually managed to take control of his satrapy. According to Curtius, in his speech given at Hecatompylos in 330 BC Alexander the Great listed Armenia among lands conquered by Macedonians, implying that Mithrenes succeeded in conquering it; on the other hand, Justin reproduced Pompeius Trogus' rendition of a speech attributed to Mithridates VI of Pontus, which mentioned that Alexander did not conquer Armenia.

== Proposed different satraps of Armenia ==
Dexippus lists the satrapy of Carmania as assigned to Neoptolemus after the death of Alexander; however, Diodorus and Justin assign this satrapy to Tlepolemus instead. A. G. Roos emended the text of Dexippus to assign Carmania to Tlepolemus and Armenia to Neoptolemus. Pat Wheatley and Waldemar Heckel found this emendation to be unlikely to represent the original text, and considered it more likely that the fragment of the text of Dexippus includes a scribal error, as "Neoptolemus" is an easy corruption of "Tlepolemus". Neoptolemus apparently campaigned in Armenia after the death of Alexander, but his official status in this area is unclear; he might have been a strategos rather than a satrap. Neoptolemus managed only to create havoc in Armenia, which suggests that he wasn't cooperating with any existing satrap.

Diodorus and Polyaenus mention a man named Orontes, who was a Satrap of Armenia during the Second War of the Diadochi; Diodorus adds that this Orontes was a friend of Peucestas. Edward Anson and Waldemar Heckel consider this satrap to be the same Orontes who fought for Darius III in the Battle of Gaugamela; the authors state that Mithrenes may have perished in an unsuccessful attempt to wrest Armenia from Orontes.

== Possible role as a satrap of Armenia ==
On the other hand, N. G. L. Hammond interpreted the sources as indicating that Armenia was already in submission when Mithrenes was sent there from Babylon late in 331 BC, that Mithrenes took it over as satrap ruling on behalf of the new Macedonian regime, and that he was left as satrap in 323 BC when Perdiccas let some satrapies remain under the existing satraps; in 317 BC Mithrenes was no longer satrap but had been replaced by Orontes. Hammond noted that Strabo described the satrapy of Armenia as small compared to the size of Armenia under Artaxias I and Zariadres; on the basis of this passage Hammond suggested that Mithrenes' rule may not have extended as far as Lake Van.

After the death of Neoptolemus, and during the struggles among the Diadochi, it seems Mithrenes not only returned to his ancestral seat but declared himself king.

== Possibly listed among the ancestors of Antiochus I Theos of Commagene ==
One of the inscriptions from the Mount Nemrut detailing the ancestry of Antiochus I Theos of Commagene lists an ancestor whose name was incompletely preserved and who was a son of Aroandas, the second ancestor of Antiochus mentioned in the inscriptions from Mount Nemrut who bore that name (identified with the Orontes who was a commander in the Battle of Gaugamela by Karl Julius Beloch and Herman Brijder; Friedrich Karl Dörner found this identification questionable). Ernst Honigmann emended the name of the son of Aroandas as [Mιθρ]άνην, [Mithr]anen. However, Friedrich Karl Dörner and John H. Young (1996) interpreted the first preserved letter of the name as a delta, so that the name of the son of Aroandas ended with -δανης, -danes. Herman Brijder (2014) also interpreted the inscription as indicating that name of the son of Aroandas II ended with -danes.

== Bibliography ==
- Smith, William (editor); Dictionary of Greek and Roman Biography and Mythology, "Mithrenes", Boston, (1867)
