= Rhodogune (daughter of Artaxerxes II) =

Daughter of Artaxerxes II, wife of Orontes I

Rhodogune was a Persian princess from the Achaemenid dynasty, who was a daughter of Artaxerxes II (r. 404–358 BC).

Following the Battle of Cunaxa in 401 BC, she was given by her father in marriage to the Bactrian nobleman Orontes I, who was the satrap of Armenia. Their marriage is mentioned in one of the stelae of Mount Nemrut, erected by their descendant Antiochus I of Commagene (r. 70–31 BC) in order to highlight the Commagenian claim to Achaemenid ancestry.

== Sources ==
- Brijder, Herman (2014). Nemrud Dağı: Recent Archaeological Research and Conservation Activities in the Tomb Sanctuary on Mount Nemrud. Walter de Gruyter. ISBN 978-1-61451-713-9.
- Schmitt, Rüdiger (2002). "Orontes". In Yarshater, Ehsan (ed.). Encyclopædia Iranica (Online ed.). Encyclopædia Iranica Foundation.
- Shayegan, M. Rahim (2016). "The Arsacids and Commagene". In Curtis, Vesta Sarkhosh; Pendleton, Elizabeth J.; Alram, Michael; Daryaee, Touraj (eds.). The Parthian and Early Sasanian Empires: Adaptation and Expansion. Oxbow Books. ISBN 978-1-78570-208-2.
- Stronk, Jan (2016). Semiramis' Legacy: The History of Persia According to Diodorus of Sicily. Edinburgh Studies in Ancient Persia. Vol. 3. Edinburgh University Press. ISBN 978-1-474-41426-5.
