= Orontes III =

King of Armenia from 321 to 260 BC

King of Armenia
- Reign: 321 – 260 BC
- Coronation: 321 BC
- Predecessor: Mithrenes
- Successor: Sames
- Died: 260 BC
- Issue: Sames
- Dynasty: Orontid dynasty
- Father: Mithrenes

Orontes III (Old Persian: *Arvanta-) was King of Armenia. In his reign he struggled for control of the Kingdom of Sophene with king Antiochus II Theos until being defeated in 272 BC and was forced to pay a large tribute which included 300 talents of silver and 1,000 horses and mules. Orontes III was subsequently murdered in 260 BC, whether at the instigation of King Antiochus II is not recorded. His son, Sames, continued to rule in Sophene.

== Sources ==
- Facella, Margherita (2021). "Orontids". In Yarshater, Ehsan (ed.). Encyclopædia Iranica (Online ed.). Encyclopædia Iranica Foundation.
- Marciak, Michał (2017). Sophene, Gordyene, and Adiabene: Three Regna Minora of Northern Mesopotamia Between East and West. BRILL. ISBN 9789004350724.
