= Arsames I =

King of Armenia, Sophene and Commagene from 260 to 228 BC

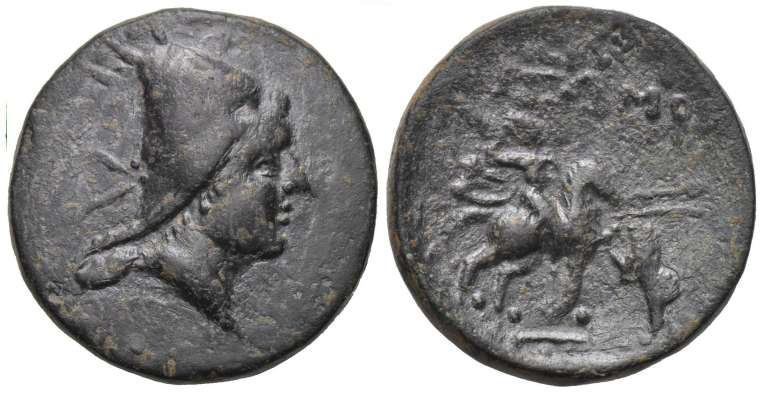
- Coinage of Arsames, King of Sophene.

King of Armenia, Sophene & Commagene
- Reign: 260 – 228 BC
- Coronation: 260 BC
- Successor: Possibly Arsames II; Xerxes, King of Sophene & Commagene
- Died: 228 BC
- Burial: Arsameia
- Issue: Xerxes; Orontes IV; Mithrenes II
Names
- Arsames I
- Dynasty: Orontid dynasty
- Father: Sames

Arsames I (Greek: Ἀρσάμης; Old Persian: 𐎠𐎼𐏁𐎠𐎶) seems to have taken control of Commagene, Sophene and Armenia in the year 260 BC after the death of his grandfather Orontes III, king of Armenia, and his father Sames, king of Commagene.

== Name ==
"Arsames" is the Hellenized form of the Old Persian name Aršāma (Note: Also spelled Ṛšāma-.) ("having a hero’s strength"), which was a common name within the Persian Achaemenid family as well as amongst the Persian elite of the Achaemenid Empire (550–330 BC). The name is a compound, composed of aršan ("male, hero") and ama ("strength"). (Note: The compound words are spelled šršan- and ama- respectively if the spelling Ṛšāma- is used.) The name is attested in Aramaic as ʾršm. The feminine form of the name, *Aršāmā (Greek Arsamē), is attested in the daughter of Darius the Great (522–486 BC).

== Reign ==
The Seleucid Empire was always trying to overthrow the Armenian dynasties who still ruled the lands their forebears had in the time of the Achaemenid Empire.

Ziaelas of Bithynia found refuge at the court of king Arsames, and upon the death of king Nicomedes I of Bithynia Ziaelas returned to take the kingdom in 254 BC.

Arsames also supported Antiochus Hierax against his brother, Seleucus II Callinicus, who was defeated at a battle against king Mithridates II of Pontus near Ankara in 239 BC, after which Seleucus lost control of any lands he had across the Taurus mountains. This was to the benefit of Arsames.

Arsames then founded the cities of Arsamosata in Sophene and Arsameia (known today as Eski Kale) in Commagene in 235 BC.

After his death his eldest son Xerxes became king of Commagene, Sophene and Armenia. Orontes IV would succeed Xerxes whilst another son known as "Mithras" (or Mithrenes II) is recorded as being the High Priest of the temple to the Sun and Moon at Armavir.

== Children ==
- Xerxes, King of Armenia and Sophene 228 – 212 BC
- Orontes IV, King of Armenia 212 – 200 BC
- Mithrenes II, High Priest of the temple to the Sun and Moon at Armavir.

== See also ==
- Commagene
- List of rulers of Commagene
