= Xerxes of Sophene =

King of Sophene and Commagene from 228 to 212 BC

Xerxes
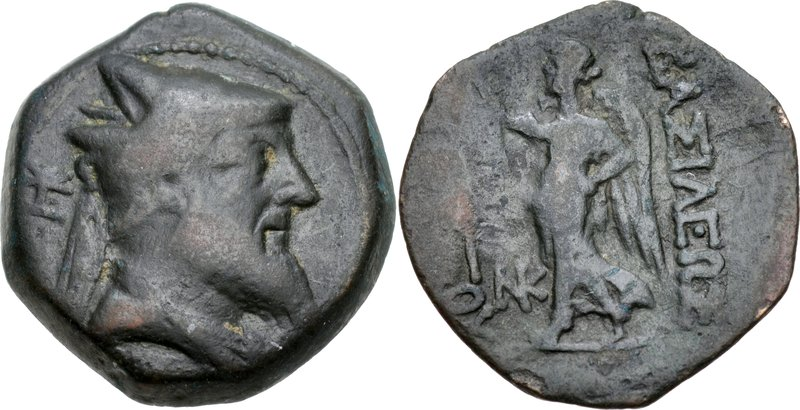
- Coin of Xerxes, from around 220 BC

King of Sophene and Commagene
- Reign: 228 – c. 204/202 BC
- Predecessor: Arsames I
- Successor: Zariadres
- Died: c. 204/202 BC
- Consort: Antiochis
- Dynasty: Orontid dynasty
- Father: Arsames I

Xerxes (Ancient Greek: Ξέρξης; Old Persian: 𐎧𐏁𐎹𐎠𐎼𐏁𐎠) was king of Sophene and Commagene from 228 BC to 212 BC. He was the son and successor of Arsames I.

== Name ==
Xérxēs (Ξέρξης) is the Greek and Latin (Xerxes, Xerses) transliteration of the Old Iranian Xšaya-ṛšā ("ruling over heroes"), a popular name amongst the rulers of the Persian Achaemenid Empire.

== Reign ==
Xerxes belonged to the Orontid dynasty of Iranian and Armenian origin. His father was Arsames I, who ruled Sophene, Commagene and possibly Armenia. Xerxes succeeded his father as the ruler of Sophene and Commagene in 228 BC, while his brother Orontes IV ruled Greater Armenia. In 223 BC, several Seleucid satraps rebelled against King Antiochus III, including Artabazanes (Upper Media), Molon (Lower Media), Alexander (Persis), and Achaeus (Asia Minor). By 220 BC Antiochus had put down most of the rebellions; however, Achaeus was not defeated until 213 BC.

These rebellions help explain Antiochus' subsequent aggressive policy toward his satrap Xerxes. By 212 BC, Antiochus III had invaded the domain of Xerxes, who had refused to pay tribute, and besieged him at Arsamosata. During the siege, some of Antiochus's advisors proposed deposing Xerxes and installing Mithridates, a nephew of Antiochus, in his place. Antiochus declined this counsel. He summoned Xerxes, waived the bulk of the tribute arrears that Xerxes' father Arsames I had accumulated, and accepted a reduced immediate settlement of 300 talents, 1,000 horses, and 1,000 mules. Xerxes was restored to his position as king and given Antiochis, sister of Antiochus III, as his wife.

Xerxes died c. 204-202 BC. John of Antioch, a late source, reports that he was poisoned by Antiochis on instructions from her brother. Grainger judges this account unreliable, noting that poisoning was frequently alleged in cases of politically convenient death in the ancient world, and that neither Antiochus nor Antiochis had any obvious motive: Sophene was vulnerable, Antiochus was not under pressure of time, and Antiochis, having been queen for approximately a decade, had no evident reason to act against her husband. Grainger concludes that Xerxes most likely died a natural death.

After the death of Xerxes, Antiochis subsequently returned to her brother's court in Syria, where Antiochus would have resumed his role as her legal guardian and Xerxes's kingdom appears to have been annexed by Antiochus. Xerxes and Antiochis had no known children, and his former kingdom was governed by an appointee of Antiochus, Zariadres, who belonged to another branch of the Orontids.

== Sources ==
- Adrych, Philippa; Bracey, Robert; Dalglish, Dominic; Lenk, Stefanie; Wood, Rachel (2017). Elsner, Jaś (ed.). Images of Mithra. Oxford University Press. ISBN 9780192511119.
- Babaie, Sussan; Grigor, Talinn (2015). Persian Kingship and Architecture: Strategies of Power in Iran from the Achaemenids to the Pahlavis. I.B.Tauris. pp. 1–288. ISBN 9780857734778.
- Ball, Warwick (2002). Rome in the East: The Transformation of an Empire. Routledge. ISBN 9781134823871.
- Canepa, Matthew P. (2015). "Dynastic Sanctuaries and the Transformation of Iranian Kingship between Alexander and Islam". In Babaie, Sussan; Grigor, Talinn (eds.). Persian Kingship and Architecture: Strategies of Power in Iran from the Achaemenids to the Pahlavis. I.B.Tauris. pp. 1–288. ISBN 9780857734778.
- Chahin, M (1987). The Kingdom of Armenia. Croom Helm.
- Drower, M; Grey, E.; Sherwin-White, S.; Wiesehöfer, J. (2021). "Armenia". Oxford Classical Dictionary. doi:10.1093/acrefore/9780199381135.013.777. ISBN 978-0-19-938113-5.
- Facella, Margherita (2021). "Orontids". In Yarshater, Ehsan (ed.). Encyclopædia Iranica (Online ed.). Encyclopædia Iranica Foundation.
- Gaggero, Gianfranco (2016). "Armenians in Xenophon". Greek Texts and Armenian Traditions: An Interdisciplinary Approach. De Gruyter. "The above mentioned Orontids..[..]..but also because the two satraps who were contemporaries of Xenophon's are explicitly stated to be Persian."
- Garsoian, Nina (2005). "Tigran II". Encyclopaedia Iranica.
- Ghafurov, Bobojon (1971). История иранского государства и культуры [History of the Iranian State and Culture] (PDF) (in Russian). Moscow: Nauka: Chief Editorial Office of Eastern Literature. OCLC 8240688.
- Marciak, Michał (2017). Sophene, Gordyene, and Adiabene: Three Regna Minora of Northern Mesopotamia Between East and West. BRILL. ISBN 9789004350724.
- Michels, Christoph (2021). "'Achaemenid' and 'Hellenistic' Strands of Representation in the Minor Kingdoms of Asia Minor". Common Dwelling Place of all the Gods: Commagene in its Local, Regional, and Global Context. Franz Steiner Verlag. pp. 475–496. ISBN 978-3515129251.
- Olbrycht, Marek Jan (2021). Early Arsakid Parthia (ca. 250-165 B.C.). Brill. ISBN 978-9004460751.
- Panossian, Razmik (2006). The Armenians From Kings and Priests to Merchants and Commissars. United Kingdom: Columbia University Press. pp. 35. ISBN 9781850657880. "It is not known whether the Yervandunis were ethnically Armenian. They probably had marriage links to the rulers of Persia and other leading noble houses in Armenia."
- Russell, J. R. (1986). "Armenia and Iran iii. Armenian Religion". Encyclopaedia Iranica, Vol. II, Fasc. 4. pp. 438–444.
- Sartre, Maurice (2005). The Middle East Under Rome. Harvard University Press. ISBN 9780674016835.
- Schmitt, Rüdiger (2000). "Xerxes i. The Name". Encyclopaedia Iranica.
- Strootman, Rolf (2020). "Hellenism and Persianism in Iran". Dabir. 7: 201–227. doi:10.1163/29497833-00701016. hdl:1874/408015.
- Diodorus Siculus (1954). Book XIX. Harvard University Press MCMLIV. p. 31. "Clarification: this source supports the Orontid Armenian descent"
- Sullivan (1977). ANRW 2:8. pp. 743–748..
- Strootman, Rolf (2021). 'Orontid kingship in its Hellenistic context: The Seleucid connections of Antiochos I of Commagene'. M. Blömer, S. Riedel, M. J. Versluys, and E. Winter eds., Common Dwelling Place of all the Gods: Commagene in its Local, Regional and Global Hellenistic Context. Oriens et Occidens: Stuttgart : Franz Steiner Verlag. pp. 296, 298–300. "His Persianism meanwhile was a constructed identity with contemporaneous aims and not a case of real 'continuity'. The historical roots of the Commagenian dynasty – whether Persian, Armenian, Macedonian or a mixture of all that – have little relevance for understanding Antiochos' dynastic policy, which can best be understood in the context of its own time rather than from the Persian 'traditions' that Antiochos presents to us but are not attested in Commagene before his reign.[...]The dual rows of stelae on both the east and west terrace (fg 2) represent Antiochos' progonoi in respectively the male and female line: the first traces his ancestry through Commagenian kings and Armenian satraps to the Achaemenid dynasty (EN I, 1–15; WS I, 1–15);[...]As regards the historicity of Antiochos' Achaemenid ancestry: a marital bond between the Orontid rulers of Armenia and the Achaemenid dynasty has indeed been attested, and is referred to on Nemrud Dağ by the mentioning of Rhodogune, daughter of Artaxerxes II, on stele 6, which is dedicated to the first of the Armenian satraps, Aroandas/Orontes I (Artaxerxes II precedes him on stele 5): "Aroandas son of Artasuras, who married Queen Rhodogune, daughter of Artaxerxes". A weak link, however, appears in the form of the first Commagenian ruler, Ptolemaios, who is supposed to be the connection between on the one hand the rulers of Commagene and on the other hand the Orontid kings of Armenia. The Armenian Orontids controlled Commagene as part of their holdings until it became a separate administrative unit or kingdom within the Seleucid Empire, perhaps in the reign of Antiochos III the Great. Next to nothing, however, is known about this Ptolemaios, who ruled as an independent Seleucid client from ca. 163 or 150 BCE. While the link between the Achaemenids and the Orontids of Armenia is indicated by the mentioning of Rhodogune, a connection between Ptolemaios and the Armenian Orontids is conspicuously absent, though a marital link is not in itself impossible."
- Toumanoff, Cyril (1963). Studies in Christian Caucasian History. Georgetown University Press.
