= Satrapy of Armenia =

Period of Yervanduni kingdom

Satrapy of Armenia 𐎠𐎼𐎷𐎡𐎴
- 570 BC–321 BC
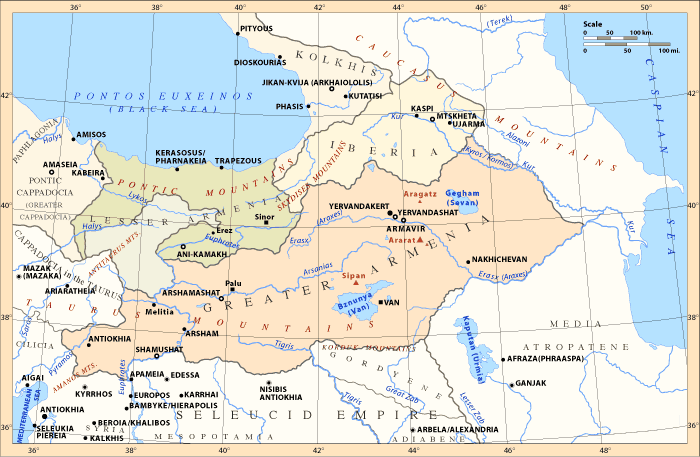
- Territory of the Orontid dynasty in IV-II BC
- Status: Satrapy
- Capital: Erebuni
- Common languages: Armenian; Aramaic (South); Median (East)
- Religion: Armenian polytheism Zoroastrianism
- Government: Monarchy
- King
- History
  - Established: 570 BC
  - Disestablished: 321 BC
- ISO 3166 code: AM
Preceded by
Urartu
Medes
Succeeded by
Kingdom of Armenia (antiquity)
Lesser Armenia
Sophene
Commagene

The Satrapy of Armenia (Old Persian: 𐎠𐎼𐎷𐎡𐎴, romanized: Armina or 𐎠𐎼𐎷𐎡𐎴𐎹, Arminiya), a region controlled by the Orontid dynasty (570–201 BC), was one of the satrapies of the Achaemenid Empire in the 6th century BC that later became an independent kingdom. Its capital were Erebuni.

== History ==
=== Orontid dynasty ===
The Orontid dynasty, or known by their native name, Eruandid or Yervanduni, was an Iranian hereditary dynasty that ruled the satrapy of Armenia, the successor state to the Iron Age kingdom of Urartu (Ararat). It is suggested that it held dynastic familial linkages to the ruling Achaemenid dynasty. (Note: It is not known whether the Yervandunis were ethnically Armenian. They probably had marriage links to the rulers of Persia and other leading noble houses in Armenia.) (Note: Although the origins of the Ervanduni [Orontid] family is not clear, historians suggest dynastic familial linkages to the ruling Achaemenid dynasty in Persia.) Throughout their existence, the Orontids stressed their lineage from the Achaemenids to strengthen their political legitimacy.

Members of the dynasty ruled Armenia intermittently during the period spanning from the 6th to at least the 2nd centuries BC, first as client kings or satraps of the Median and Achaemenid empires and later, after the collapse of the Achaemenid empire, as rulers of an independent kingdom, and later as kings of Sophene and Commagene, which eventually succumbed to the Roman Empire.

Following the demise of the Achaemenid Empire, the Satrapy of Armenia was incorporated into Alexander's empire. After Alexander's death, the Orontids gained independence from 321 BC until 301 BC when the Kingdom of Armenia fell to the Seleucid Empire. In 212 BC, Xerxes, King of Armenia revolted against the Seleucids but capitulated when besieged at his capital, Arsamasota, by Antiochus III.

== Language ==
Despite the Hellenistic invasion of Persia, Persian and local Armenian culture remained the strongest element within society and the elites. (Note: The Hellenistic invasion of Persia partially influenced Armenia as well, but Persian and local Armenian culture remained the strongest element within society and the elites.)

The Orontid administration used Aramaic, where it was used in official documents for centuries. Whereas most inscriptions used Old Persian cuneiform. Xenophon used an interpreter to speak to Armenians, while some Armenian villages were conversant in Persian.

The Greek inscriptions at Armavir indicate that the upper classes used Greek as one of their languages. Under Orontes IV (r. ca. 210–200 B.C.), the structure of government had begun to resemble Greek institutions, and Greek was used as the language of the royal court. Orontes IV had surrounded himself by the Hellenized nobility and sponsored the establishment of a Greek school in Armavir, the capital of the Armenian kingdom.

== See also ==
- Orontid dynasty
- List of Armenian monarchs
- Urartu
- Achaemenid Empire
- Kingdom of Armenia (antiquity)

== Sources ==
- Allsen, Thomas T. (2011). The Royal Hunt in Eurasian History. University of Pennsylvania Press. p. 37. ISBN 978-0812201079.
- Ball, Warwick (2002). Rome in the East: The Transformation of an Empire. Routledge. ISBN 9781134823871.
- Bournoutian, George (2006). A Concise History of the Armenian People. California: Mazda Publishers, Inc. p. 23. ISBN 1-56859-141-1. "Aramaic, the language of the imperial administration, was introduced into Armenia, where, for centuries, it continued to be used in official documents. Old Persian cuneiform, meanwhile, was used in most inscriptions. Xenophon mentions that he used a Persian interpreter to converse with Armenians and in some Armenian villages they responded in Persian."
- Canepa, Matthew (2010). "Achaemenid and Seleukid Royal Funerary Practices and Middle Iranian Kingship". In Börm, H.; Wiesehöfer, J. (eds.). Commutatio et Contentio. Studies in the Late Roman, Sasanian, and Early Islamic Near East in Memory of Zeev Rubin. pp. 1–21.
- Canepa, Matthew P. (2015). "Dynastic Sanctuaries and the Transformation of Iranian Kingship between Alexander and Islam". In Babaie, Sussan; Grigor, Talinn (eds.). Persian Kingship and Architecture: Strategies of Power in Iran from the Achaemenids to the Pahlavis. I.B.Tauris. p. 80. ISBN 978-1848857513. "Iranian culture deeply influenced Armenia, and Iranian dynasties ruled Armenia during several important periods, including the Orontids (c. sixth century - c. early second century BCE) and Arsacids (54-428 CE)."
- Chahin, M. (1987). The Kingdom of Armenia: A History. Curzon Press.
- Drower, M; Grey, E.; Sherwin-White, S.; Wiesehöfer, J. (2021). "Armenia". Oxford Classical Dictionary. doi:10.1093/acrefore/9780199381135.013.777. ISBN 978-0-19-938113-5.
- Facella, Margherita (2021). "Orontids". In Yarshater, Ehsan (ed.). Encyclopædia Iranica (Online ed.). Encyclopædia Iranica Foundation.
- Gaggero, Gianfranco (2016). "Armenians in Xenophon". Greek Texts and Armenian Traditions: An Interdisciplinary Approach. De Gruyter. "The above mentioned Orontids..[..]..but also because the two satraps who were contemporaries of Xenophon's are explicitly stated to be Persian."
- Garsoian, N. (2005). "TIGRAN II". Encyclopaedia Iranica. "Tigran (Tigranes) II was the most distinguished member of the so-called Artašēsid/Artaxiad dynasty, which has now been identified as a branch of the earlier Eruandid [Orontid] dynasty of Iranian origin attested as ruling in Armenia from at least the 5th century B.C.E"
- Hovannisian, Richard G. (1997). The Armenian People from Ancient to Modern Times. Vol. I: The Dynastic Periods: From Antiquity to the Fourteenth Century. Palgrave Macmillan. "..but the existence of a local Armenian dynasty, probably of Iranian origin.."
- Stausberg, Michael; de Jong, Albert (2015). "Armenian and Georgian Zoroastrianism". The Wiley Blackwell Companion to Zoroastrianism. John Wiley & Sons, Ltd. pp. 119–128.
- Lang, David M. (2000). "Iran, Armenia and Georgia". In Yarshater, Ehsan (ed.). The Cambridge History of Iran, Volume 3: The Seleucid, Parthian and Sasanid Periods. Cambridge University Press. p. 535. ISBN 0-521-20092-X. "The most striking example of the syncretism of gods in ancient Parthia actually occurs in a former Armenian satellite kingdom, namely Commagene, the modern Malatya district. Here a scion of the Armenian Orontid house, King Antiochus I (69 — 38 B.C.) built himself a funeral hill at Nimrud Dagh.(..) We see the king's paternal ancestors, traced back to the Achaemenian monarch Darius, son of Hystaspes, while Greek inscriptions record the dead ruler's connections with the Armenian dynasty of the Orontids."
- Manandian, Hagop (1965). The Trade and Cities of Armenia in Relation to Ancient World Trade. Armenian library of the Calouste Gulbenkian Foundation. p. 37.
- Michels, Christoph (2021). "'Achaemenid' and 'Hellenistic' Strands of Representation in the Minor Kingdoms of Asia Minor". Common Dwelling Place of all the Gods: Commagene in its Local, Regional, and Global Context. Franz Steiner Verlag. pp. 475–496. ISBN 978-3515129251.
- Olbrycht, Marek Jan (2021). Early Arsakid Parthia (ca. 250-165 B.C.). Brill. ISBN 978-9004460751.
- Panossian, Razmik (2006). The Armenians From Kings and Priests to Merchants and Commissars. United Kingdom: Columbia University Press. pp. 35. ISBN 9781850657880. "It is not known whether the Yervandunis were ethnically Armenian. They probably had marriage links to the rulers of Persia and other leading noble houses in Armenia."
- Payaslian, Simon (2007). The history of Armenia : from the origins to the present (1st ed.). New York: Palgrave Macmillan. pp. 8–9. ISBN 978-1403974679.
- Russell, J. R. (1986). "ARMENIA AND IRAN iii. Armenian Religion". In Yarshater, Ehsan (ed.). Encyclopædia Iranica. Encyclopaedia Iranica. Vol. II/4: Architecture IV–Armenia and Iran IV. London and New York: Routledge & Kegan Paul. pp. 438–444. ISBN 978-0-71009-104-8. "Iran, however, was to be the dominant influence in Armenian spiritual culture. The Orontid, Artaxiad, and Arsacid dynasties were all Iranian in origin, and the greater part of the Armenian vocabulary consists of Mid. Ir. loanwords. The Armenians preserved strong regional traditions which appear to have been incorporated into Zoroastrianism, a religion adopted by them probably in the Achaemenid period."
- Sartre, Maurice (2005). The Middle East Under Rome. Harvard University Press. p. 23. ISBN 978-0674016835. "The Commagene kings claimed to be descended from the Orontids, a powerful Iranian family that had ruled the area during the Achaemenid period. They were related to the Achaemenids who had built a kingdom (...)"
- Schmitt, Rüdiger (2002). "ORONTES". Encyclopaedia Iranica.
- Strootman, Rolf (2020). "Hellenism and Persianism in Iran". Dabir. 7: 201–227. doi:10.1163/29497833-00701016. hdl:1874/408015.
- Toumanoff, Cyril (1963). Studies in Christian Caucasian history. Washington D.C.: Georgetown University Press. p. 278. "The eponym's praenomen Orontes is as Iranian as the dynasty itself.."
- Adrych, Philippa; Bracey, Robert; Dalglish, Dominic; Lenk, Stefanie; Wood, Rachel (2017). Elsner, Jaś (ed.). Images of Mithra. Oxford University Press. ISBN 9780192511119.
