= Ayrarat =

Historical province of Armenia

Coordinates: 39.9167°N 44.7167°E

Այրարատ
- Province of the ancient kingdom of Armenia
- Capital: various, including Artaxata
- History
  - Reign of Artaxias I: 189 BC
  - Arab conquest of Armenia: 650 AD

Ayrarat (Armenian: Այրարատ) was the central and largest province of ancient Kingdom of Greater Armenia, located in the plain of the upper Aras River. Throughout history, it served as the political, economic, and cultural core of Armenia with most of its historical capitals being were located there, including Armavir, Yervandashat, Artaxata (Artashat), Vagharshapat, Dvin, Bagaran, Shirakavan, Kars and Ani, and the modern capital of Armenia, Yerevan.

== Name ==
The name Ayrarat is clearly connected with Uruatri/Urartu and the biblical Ararat, and perhaps also with the Alarodians mentioned by Herodotus. It is not used by any of the classical Greek and Roman authors who write about Armenia, which suggests that it was a purely local name used to refer to the central lands of Armenia. Robert H. Hewsen does not rule out the possibility that Armenians applied the name to the great plain surrounding Mount Masis after converting to Christianity in the early fourth century and identifying the biblical Ararat with Masis. If this is the case, then Ayrarat may be identical with the Araxēnon Pedion ("Araxes plain") mentioned by Strabo.

The ultimate etymology of the names Urartu, Ayrarat, and Ararat is not known for certain. In the Armenian tradition, Ayrarat and the Ararat plain are associated with the legendary Armenian king Ara the Handsome.

The province is also referred to in Armenian sources as the Mijnashkharh Hayotsʻ ("central province of Armenia") or as the Glukh erkrin Hayotsʻ ("head province of Armenia"). During the Arsacid period, Ayrarat referred to, in its narrowest sense, the royal domain consisting of the Ararat plain and its adjacent districts. The author of the seventh-century geography Ashkharhatsʻoytsʻ used the term Ayrarat to refer to a much larger territory. The name Ayrarat gradually fell out of use after the fall of the Bagratid Kingdom of Armenia and the conquest of Armenia by the Seljuks in the eleventh century.

== Borders ==
Ayrarat extended across the basin of the middle course of the Yeraskh River and the upper basin of the Aratsani River. It was bordered in the west by Tayk and High Armenia, in the south by Turuberan and Vaspurakan, in the east by Syunik, and in the north by Gugark. Its western boundary was formed by the Metsrats (or Tayots) mountain range; in the south, from the summit of Aytsptkunk to the northwestern end of the Sharian mountain range, the border of Ayrarat passed along the watershed heights of the Armenian Par, then through the Sharian and Tsaghkants Mountains toward the east to Tondurek, and from there to the Yeraskh (Araxes). In the east, the Geghama Mountains formed the boundary of Ayrarat; this section also included the Sharur Plain, situated in the lower course of the Arpa River. In the north, its borders passed along the mountain ranges now known as Pambak and Chldyr.

Besides the marginal mountain ranges, the Armenian Par mountain chain stretched across its southern part in an east-west direction, at the eastern end of which rise Greater and Lesser Masis. In the northern part rise the peaks of Aragats and Mount Ara, while in the western part a number of mountain branches extend, giving that part of the country a mountainous character. It should be noted, however, that these mountain ranges and isolated peaks only slightly alter the predominantly plain-like character of the Ayrarat World, since the major mountain ranges lie along its borders, whereas the Armenian Par, the smaller mountain branches, and individual peaks are merely isolated "islands" rising above various parts of this predominantly plain-like region. The plains of Kars, Basen, Shirak, Bagrevand, Ararat (with its many subdivisions), and Kogovit were well known within the Ayrarat World. Since ancient times they had been centers of agriculture and were renowned for their fertility.

== Climate ==
The climatic conditions of the Ayrarat World are diverse. Owing to its mountainous relief, the climate forms several vertical zones, ranging from the subtropical zone (the middle Araxes Valley) to the cold high-mountain zone (the high-altitude regions of Greater Masis and Aragats). Overall, the climate is sharply continental. The average annual precipitation does not exceed 350–400 mm. Air temperature fluctuations are very pronounced, reaching 70–72 degrees.

From very ancient times, because of the dry climate, irrigation canals, dams, and artificial reservoirs were constructed in the Ayrarat World (south of Aragats, in the regions of Lake Metsamor, Yerevan, the western foothills of the Geghama Mountains, near the ancient city of Armavir, in the Surmalu region, and elsewhere).

The continental climate compelled the inhabitants from ancient times to construct irrigation canals, dams, and artificial reservoirs. Forests were scarce; the forest massif of the district of Vanand (later the Sarighamish region) was of economic importance.

== Flora ==
Ayrarat is very poor in forests. Forests of any significant extent are found only in the modern Sarighamish region, which in ancient times was part of the Vanand district, as well as in the Varazhnunik district (modern Tsaghkadzor and the Hankavan Gorge). In ancient times, several artificial forest parks were also planted in Ayrarat — near Dvin, the city of Armavir, and in the Bagaran region.

Among the artificial forest parks were the Khosrov Forest (Khosrovakert) located in the Garni–Dvin–Artashat area, as well as the forests of Armavir and Bagaran. The lowland zone of Ayrarat is characterized by thorny vegetation, above which steppes extend. The typical plants of the steppes are feather grass; higher up, shrublands replace forests. In the high-mountain zone, lush alpine pastures and meadows are widespread, especially in the Aragats and Armenian Par regions.

In the lowlands of Ayrarat, salt marshes are also widespread. Thorny plants are typical for this zone. Above them lie the steppes, characterized by feather grass. Higher up, a forest zone would normally appear; however, in Ayrarat it is only fragmentarily represented and appears as shrublands rather than full forests. The high-altitude zone consists of alpine meadows, especially extensive in the high mountain regions of Aragats and the Armenian Par. Among cultivated plants, cereals, vegetables, cotton, and sesame were prominent, while among fruit crops were grapes, peaches, apricots, pears, plums, and others.

In the Ayrarat World, as in other regions of the Armenian Highlands, animals of the temperate zone were widespread. Of major economic importance was a species of worm inhabiting the marshes of the Ararat plain, from which the high-quality, colorfast dye “vordan karmir” was produced.

== Natural resources ==
From ancient times, Ayrarat was distinguished by a variety of natural resources. It was especially known for table salt (Kokhb and Kaghzvan). These salt deposits have retained their importance to this day. In terms of metallic resources, Ayrarat was poor: only gold, copper, and iron are mentioned. Gold occurred not as ore deposits but mixed with sand. Copper deposits were known in the Varazhnunik district. More significant were Ayrarat’s construction materials and mineral waters. Various types of tuff, marble, granite, basalt, sand, clay, and limestone are widespread here. Famous ancient hot springs of Varshak (modern Diadin region), Arzni, and other mineral water sites were located in Ayrarat.

== Districts (Gavars) ==
Ayrarat consisted of several districts: Basen, Abeghyank, Gabeghyank, Havnunik, Arsharunik, Bagrevand, Tsaghkotn, Vanand, Shirak, Aragatsotn, Chakhatk, Masyatsotn, Kogovit, Nig, Kotayk, Mazaz, Varazhnunik, Vostan, Urts, and Arats.

- Basen (also Basian) — center Basen
- Gabeghyank — center Kaghzvan
- Abeghyank — center Mzhkert.

The name Basen is of ethnic origin and once included a vast territory, including Vanand (Upper Basen). Together, Basen, Abeghyank, Gabeghyank, and Havnunik formed a natural geographical region corresponding to modern Basen. Basen lay in the west; Abeghyank and Havnunik were to the east. Gabeghyank lay in the easternmost part and bordered Arsharunik.

- Arsharunik (Yeraskhadzor) — center Bagaran, located between the Yeraskh and Akhuryan rivers. It was an important district during the Bagratid period.
- Bagrevand — center Bagavan, located in the upper Aratsani valley.
- Tsaghkotn — center Zarehavan, in the Tsaghkants mountain region.
- Vanand — center Kars, corresponding to modern Kars and Sarighamish regions.
- Shirak — center Ani, a major agricultural plain along the Akhuryan River.
- Aragatsotn — center Vagharshapat, with unclear boundaries.
- Chakhatk — center Kokhb, a fertile mountainous district.
- Masyatsotn — center Tsolakert, a harsh volcanic region of the Masis mountains.
- Kogovit — center Arshakavan, a marshy region corresponding to modern Bayazet.
- Ashotsk — center Ashotsk, a cold and humid region.
- Nig — center Kasagh, upper Kasagh River basin.
- Kotayk — center Yerevan, including modern Kotayk and surrounding areas.
- Mazaz — center Portak, upper Azat River basin.
- Varazhnunik — center Ovq.
- Vostan Hayots — center Artashat, arid valley of the Azat River.
- Urtsadzor — center Urts.
- Arats — center Arats.
- Sharur plain — center Sharur.

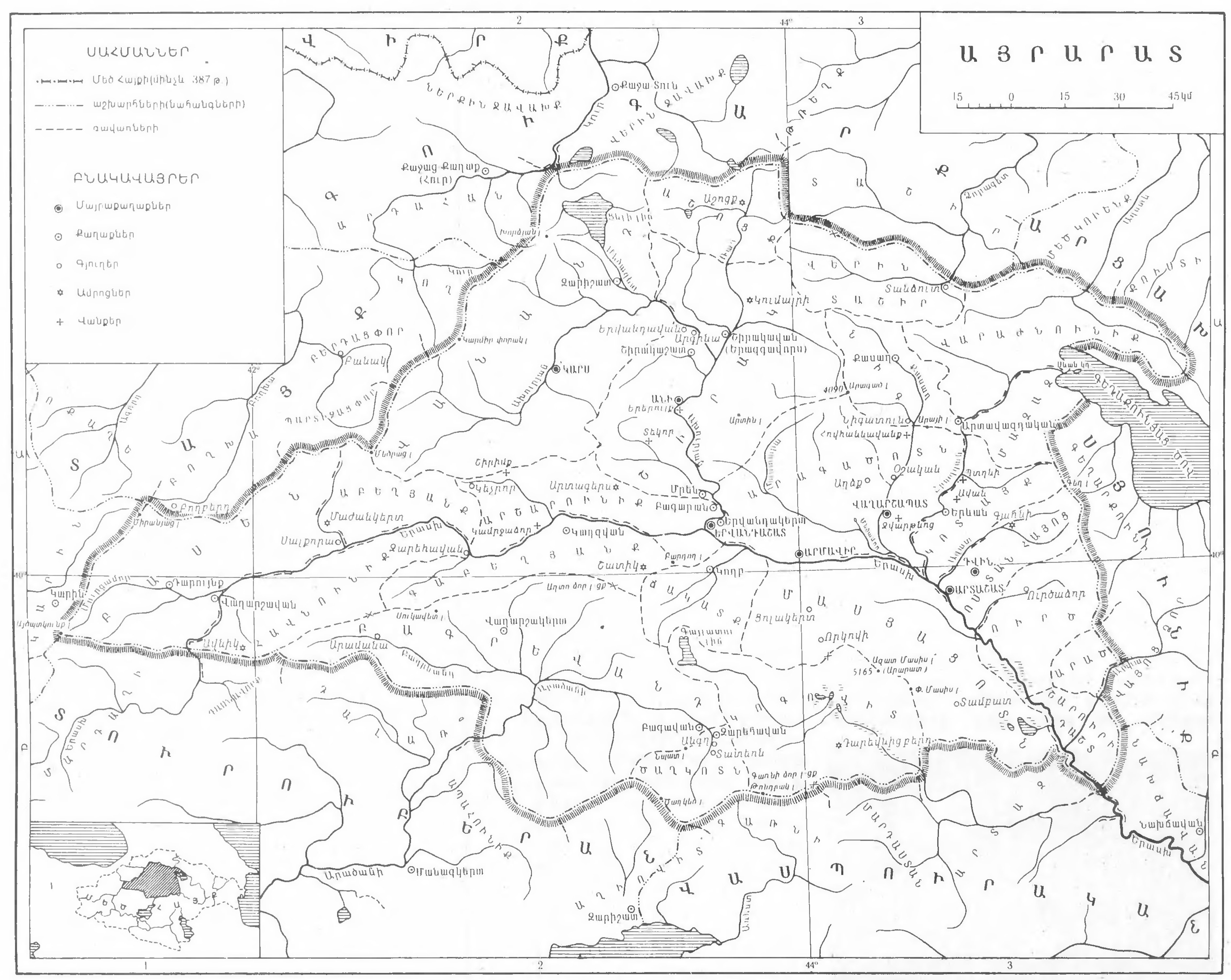
Map of Ayrarat according to Ashkharhatsʻoytsʻ

== Population ==
The population density of the Ayrarat region was high compared to other parts of Armenia. The overwhelming majority of inhabitants were Armenians. In addition to Armenians, Jews, Assyrians, Greeks, and Persians also lived in Ayrarat, especially in the cities. During the period of Arab rule, beginning in the second half of the 8th century, a significant number of Arabs settled in some cities of Ayrarat, mainly performing administrative duties and garrison service. In the later period — the 11th–13th centuries — Seljuk Turks, Mongol-Tatars, and other tribes also entered Ayrarat.

== Roads ==
The center of Armenia’s road network was the Ayrarat world. The most important junctions of the country — Armavir, Artashat, Dvin, and Ani — were located in Ayrarat. During the Urartian period, the key transport hub was Argishtihinili, which after the fall of Urartu was replaced by Yeruandashat (near the mouth of the Akhuryan River). Later, after Armenia gained political independence, Artashat — the capital of the Artaxiad dynasty — rapidly rose in importance. Until the second half of the 5th century, Artashat remained the main center of all routes passing through Ayrarat. Several major trade and strategic routes originated from Artashat, the most important of which were three:

- Artashat – Satala
- Artashat – Tigranakert
- Artashat – Tabriz

From the second half of the 5th century, Dvin became the main transport hub of Ayrarat. Five main routes originated from Dvin, described in the “Mghonachapq”:

- Dvin – Karin – Colonia – Amasia – Byzantion
- Dvin – Khlat – Kghimar – Urha – Damascus
- Dvin – Hrazdan River – Kot village (southern shore of Lake Sevan) – Zod Pass – Partav
- dDvin – Nakhchivan – Tabriz
- Dvin – Hrazdan River – Kura – Tiflis

In the 10th century, although Dvin remained a major transit center, the city of Ani also rose in importance within Ayrarat. Ani was connected by several routes both with various regions of Armenia and with neighboring countries and the ports of the Black Sea. The most important routes from Ani were:

- Ani – Trabzon
- Ani – Theodosiopolis – Amasia
- Ani – Dvin
- Ani – Tiflis
- Ani – Artanuch

These routes passing through the Araratian world, with Dvin and Ani as their key centers, gained exceptional importance especially from the end of the 9th century until the Seljuk invasions. Due to prolonged wars between the Caliphate and Byzantium, world trade through Mesopotamia, Syria, and the Mediterranean nearly came to a halt. As a result, the role of Northeastern Armenia, including Ayrarat, in global trade increased significantly.

During the Mongol period, along with general economic decline, the once prosperous cities of Ayrarat and the roads leading from them lost their economic importance. Most cities gradually turned into ordinary settlements, while some disappeared from history altogether.

District name	Capital	Other large cities	Additional information
Shirak	Ani	Shirakavan, Kumayri, Shirakashat	
Aragatsotn	Oshakan	Vagharshapat, Armavir	
Nig	Kasagh (Aparan)	Bjni	
Varazhnunik	Hovk (Dilijan)		
Vostan Hayots	Artashat, Dvin	Kakavaberd	
Vanand	Kars		
Masyats-Votn	Tsolakert		
Kogovit	Darevnitsberd		
Basean			Also known as Phasiane
Bagrevand	Alashkert		
Chakatk	Koghb		
Abeghyan	Mzhnkert		Also known as Abelyankq, Abelunk Myus, Abeghank, Abeghenk, Abeghenk Myus, and Abeghunik.
Havnunik			
Arshanunik		Yervandashat, Bagaran, Yervandakert, Artagers	Also known as Yeraskhadzor.
Tsaghkotn	Tateon		
Arats	Arats	Arats	
Urtsadzor	Urts		
Kotayk	Yerevan	Yerevan	
Mazaz	Artavazdakan		
Ashotsk	Ashotsk		
Upper Tashir	Tandzut		
Gabeghyank	Kaghzvan		

== See also ==
- List of regions of old Armenia

== Bibliography ==
- Eremyan, S. (1975). "Ayrarat". In Hambardzumyan, Viktor (ed.). Soviet Armenian Encyclopedia (in Armenian). Vol. 1. Erevan. pp. 352–353.
- Eremyan, S. T. (1963). Hayastaně ěst Ashxarhatsʻoytsʻ-i [Armenia according to the Ashkharhatsʻoytsʻ] (in Armenian). Erevan: Armenian SSR Academy of Sciences Publishing.
- Hakobyan, Tʻ. Kh.; Melikʻ-Bakhshyan, St. T.; Barseghyan, H. Kh. (1986). "Ayrarat". Hayastani ev harakitsʻ shrjanneri teghanunneri baṛaran [Dictionary of Toponymy of Armenia and Adjacent Territories] (in Armenian). Vol. 1. Yerevan State University. pp. 239–240.
- Hewsen, R. H. (1987). "Ayrarat". In Yarshater, Ehsan (ed.). Encyclopædia Iranica. Vol. III/2: Awāʾel al-maqālāt–Azerbaijan IV. London and New York: Routledge & Kegan Paul. pp. 150–151. ISBN 978-0-71009-114-7.
- Hewsen, Robert H. (1992). The Geography of Ananias of Širak (Ašxarhacʻoycʻ): The Long and the Short Recensions. Wiesbaden: Dr. Ludwig Reichert Verlag. pp. 210–220. ISBN 3-88226-485-3.
- Petrosyan, Armen (2007). "The Problem of Identification of the Proto-Armenians: A Critical Review". Journal of the Society for Armenian Studies. 16: 25–66.
