= Bagaran, Armavir =

Village in Armavir, Armenia

Bagaran Բագարան
- Location within Armenia
- Coordinates: 40°08′58″N 43°41′34″E
- Country: Armenia
- Marz (Province): Armavir

Population (2011)
  - Total: 622
- Time zone: UTC+4 ( )
  - Summer (DST): UTC+5 ( )

Bagaran (Armenian: Բագարան) is a village in the Armavir Province of Armenia near the Armenia–Turkey border. Its name is derived from the nearby ancient Armenian city of Bagaran which was a large city and fortress that straddled both banks of the Akhurian River, and served as a former capital of medieval Armenia. A small Kurdish-populated village called Kılıttaşı now partially lies on the Turkish side of the closed border.

== Toponymy ==
Historically known as Bagaran, the village was renamed Bakhchalar on January 3, 1935, and later again Bagaran on July 3, 1968, respectively.

== History ==
=== Ancient and medieval ===
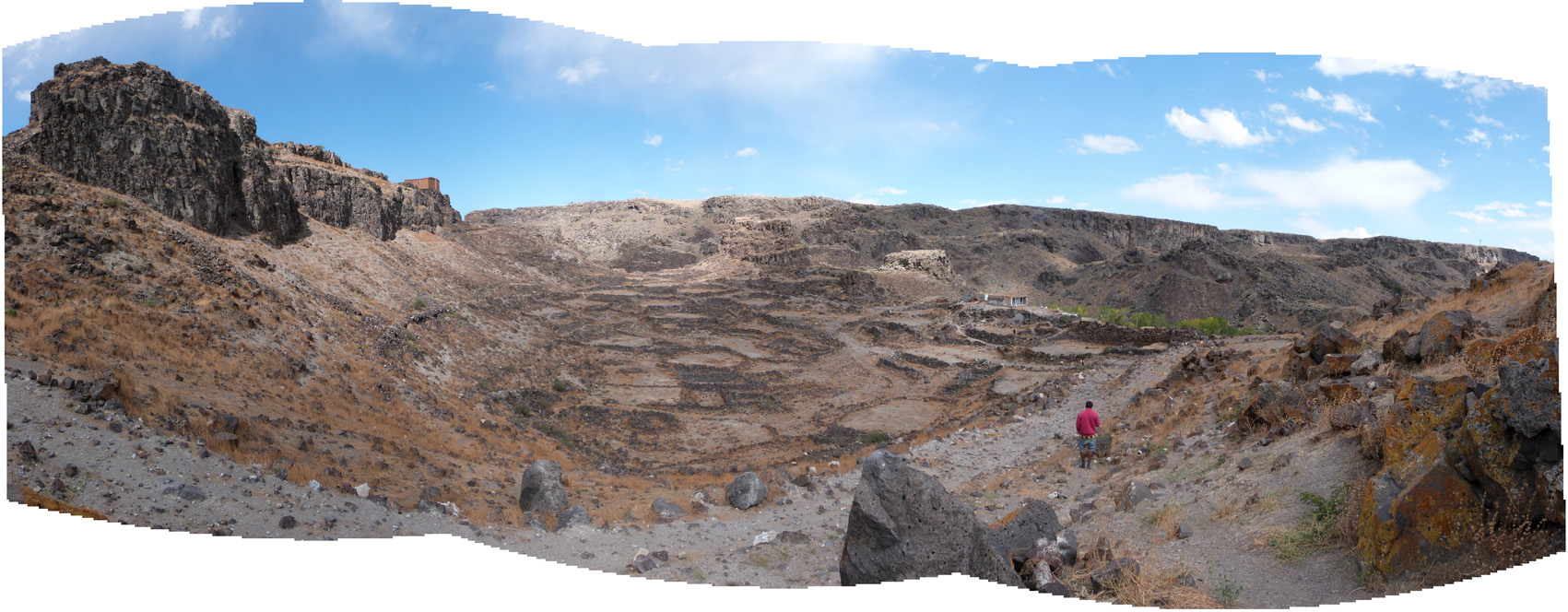
BAGARAN-KILITTAS

According to the Armenian historian Movses Khorenatsi, Bagaran was founded during the third century BC by king Orontes IV of Armenia. It quickly became the religious centre of Armenia, replacing Armavir as the main spiritual site of the Orontid pagan temples. After the fall of the Orontid dynasty and the rise of the Artaxiad dynasty, king Artaxias I moved all the pagan monuments from Bagaran and relocated them in his newly built capital of Artashat, founded in 176 BC.

During the second half of the sixth century, Bagaran, along with the entire canton of Arsharunik, became the property of the Kamsarakan princes. The Church of Saint Theodore built between 624 and 631 was one of the main landmarks of Bagaran. Inscriptions on the church of Saint Theodore of Bagaran were located at the exterior of the entire building, starting at the northern face of the western apse and running across the northern, eastern and southern faces.

The Bagratunis took over the city during the eighth century. In 895, after the establishment of the Kingdom of Armenia, Bagaran became the capital of an independent Armenia under king Ashot I. His successor, king Smbat I, moved the capital Bagaran to Shirakavan in 890. Under Bagratid rule, Bagaran remained one of the prosperous centers of the Armenian kingdom. Many members of the Bagratuni rulers, including Ashot I, were buried in Bagaran.

However, in 1045, Bagaran, along with the Armenian capital Ani, was invaded by the Byzantines. In 1064, the city was attacked and heavily destroyed by the Seljuk Turks. During the twelfth century, the Shah-Armens took over Bagaran. In 1211, Bagaran was briefly ruled by the Zakarid princes of Armenia before being invaded by the Mongols in 1236. In 1394, Bagaran was finally destroyed by Tamerlane.

=== Modern ===
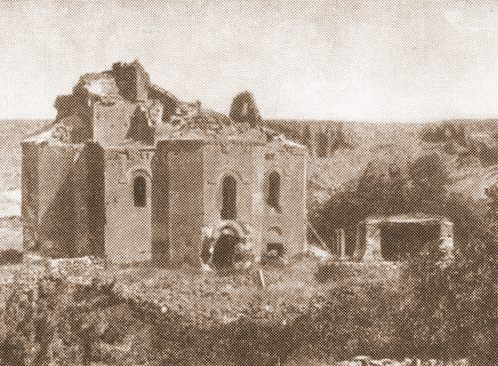
Saint Theodore Church of Bagaran, before 1923

At the beginning of the twentieth century, there was an Armenian-populated village near the site of ancient Bagaran with a population of slightly over 300. In 1920, as a result of the Armenian genocide, the territories of Republic of Armenia located west of the Akhurian River were captured by Turkey. The small group of the Armenian survivors of Bagaran crossed the river and founded the modern village of Bagaran within the Armenian SSR, just 8 km south of the site of the ancient city.

According to the Armenian historian Joseph Orbeli, the Church of Saint Theodore of Bagaran was one of the most important examples of early medieval Armenian architecture. It was largely intact before 1920 but is now entirely destroyed.

== Health ==
Bagaran has a health post where women are offered free health screenings.

== See also ==
- Armavir Province
