= -shat =

Armenian language suffix

The suffix ‑shat (also transliterated ‑šat) is a morphological element found in Armenian toponymy, particularly in place names across historical Armenian regions. It is understood to mean "happy" or "happiness" and is borrowed from Parthian and Middle Persian šād, ultimately descending from Old Persian šiyāta- ("happy, joyful").

== Etymology ==
The suffix ‑shat represents a semantic borrowing from Iranian languages during periods of linguistic and cultural contact in the ancient Near East. In the context of Armenian toponymy, its use likely reflects the influence of Parthian and Middle Persian word stems in the formation of place names.

Iranian influence on Armenian place names is well documented: similar Iranian-derived suffixes such as ‑stan (related to ‑stāna–, meaning “place”) and ‑aran (from dāna–, meaning "place" or "container") occur across the region, indicating a broader pattern of linguistic integration.

== Usage in toponyms ==
Examples of Armenian toponyms containing the suffix ‑shat include:

- Artashat – Historic city sometimes called "Artaxata", meaning "Joy of Arta" or "Joy of Artaš."
- Yervandashat – Ancient settlement, similarly combining a personal name (Yervand/Eruand) with ‑shat.
- Ashtishat – A notable site with the ‑shat element.
- Arsamosata / Arshamshat – Toponym reflecting the same suffix.
- Samosata – Place name also bearing the ‑shat ending.

The suffix typically appears at the ends of city names, possibly denoting a positive or auspicious attribute associated with the location.

== Linguistic and cultural context ==
The presence of Iranian-derived suffixes in Armenian place names is part of a larger historical pattern of lexical borrowing between Iranian languages (especially Parthian and Middle Persian) and Armenian, dating back to the Arsacid period and continuing through later eras of cultural interaction.

Studies in Armenian historical linguistics show that Iranian influence extends beyond ‑shat, including other suffixes and roots found in regional toponymy. For example, elements such as ‑astan (place/country) and ‑aran (location) are similarly traced to Iranian frameworks.

== Scholarly perspectives ==
Linguistic research emphasizes that Armenian toponyms are shaped by a complex interplay of indigenous and borrowed elements, with Iranian language forms contributing significantly to the semantic and morphological structure of many ancient place names.
