= Artaxata =

Capital of the ancient Kingdom of Armenia

Artashat
- Արտաշատ (Armenian)
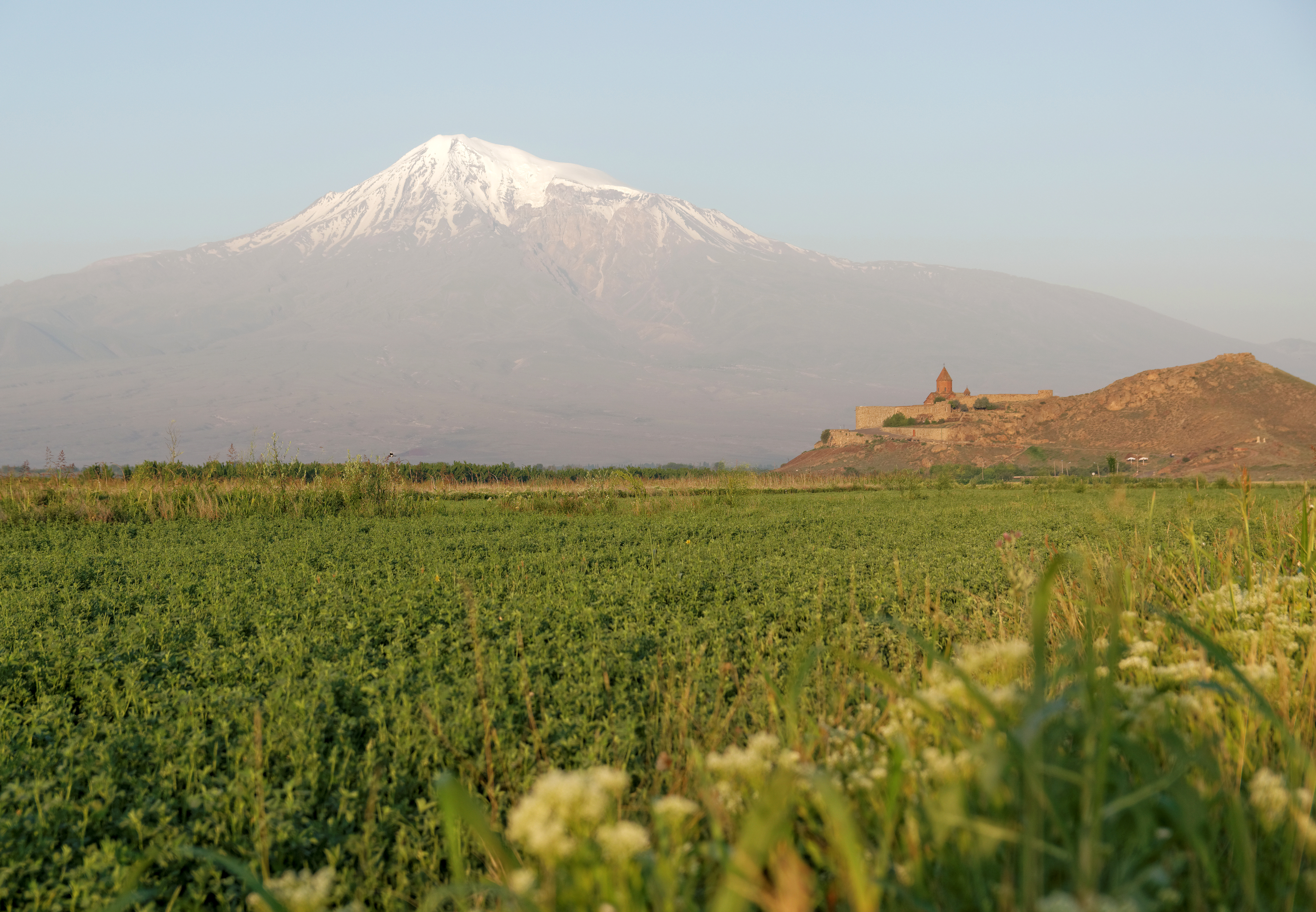
- View of Khor Virap Monastery. The hill where the monastery was built is the location of ancient Artaxata (near the village of Lusarat)

- Location within Armenia Location within Ararat
- 39°53′06″N 44°34′35″E
- Location: South of the modern town of Artashat, Ararat Province, Armenia

History
- Built: 176 BC
- Built by: King Artaxias I
- Abandoned: 7th century

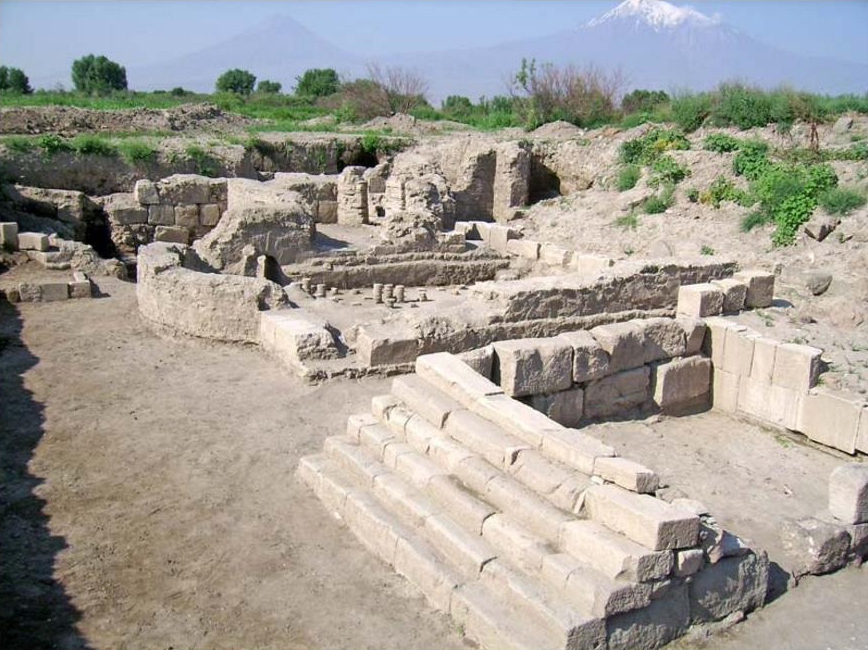
Public baths

Artashat (Armenian: Արտաշատ), Hellenized as Artaxata (Ancient Greek: Ἀρτάξατα) and Artaxiasata (Ἀρταξιάσατα), was a major city and commercial center of ancient Armenia that served as the capital of the Kingdom of Armenia from its founding in 176 BC to 120 AD, with some interruptions. It was founded during the reign of King Artaxias I (Artashes), the founder of the Artaxiad dynasty. Its ruins are located in the Ararat Province of modern-day Armenia, on the left bank of the Araks River, at the site of the monastery of Khor Virap. It was destroyed and rebuilt several times from the 1st to the 5th centuries AD, before finally being abandoned.

The remains of the great walls of the city and some of its buildings are still visible today.

== Name ==
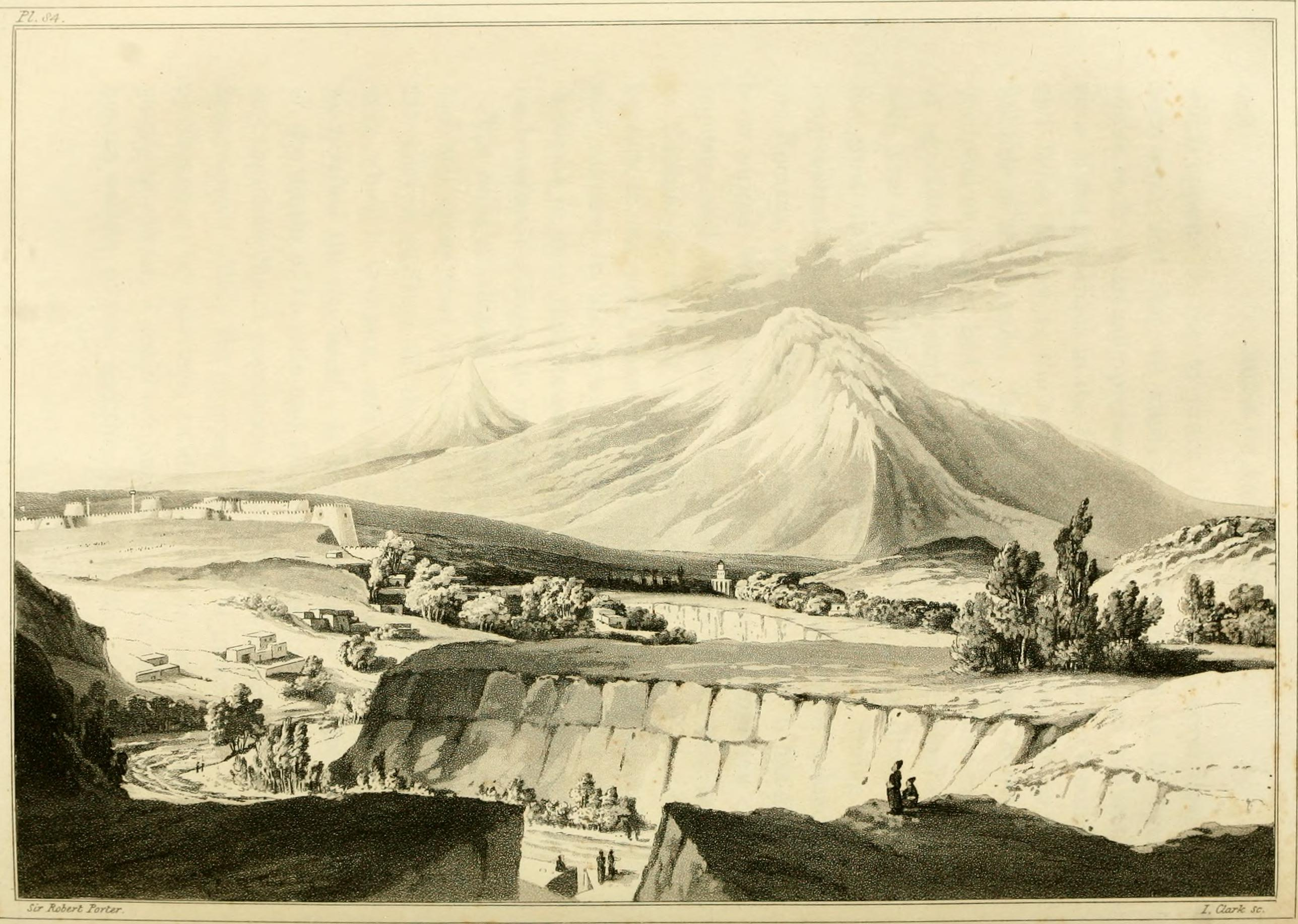
Drawing of Mount Ararat with ancient city

The name of the city is of Iranian origin. Artaxata/Artashat can be interpreted as meaning "the joy of Arta (truth)," although it is actually a shortening of Artaxšas-šāt, meaning "the joy of Artaxias," as reflected in the alternative Greek form Artaxiasata. Artaxata was named after its founder, Artaxias I, just as the cities of Arshamashat, Eruandashat, and Zarishat were named after their respective founders (see also: -shat). It was briefly renamed Neroneia in the first century AD after it was rebuilt by Tiridates I of Armenia with the help of the Roman emperor Nero. Artaxata was also known as Ostan Hayotsʻ, meaning "court/seat of the Armenians," which was also the name of the canton in which it was located.

== History and archaeology ==
=== Establishment and rise ===
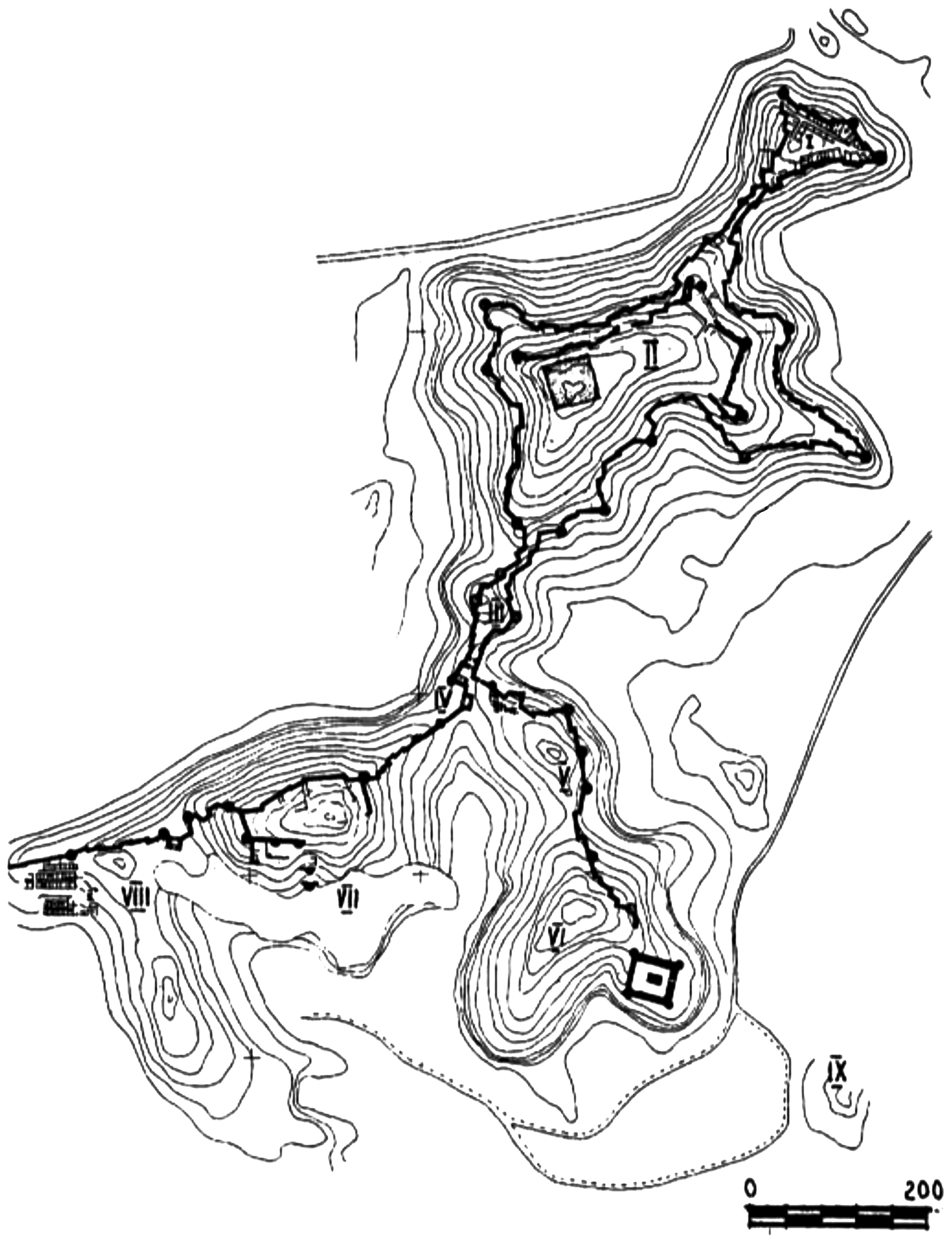
General plan of the acropolis of Artaxata, with the hills marked with Latin numerals (Hill I - Hill VIII). By Armen Tonikyan

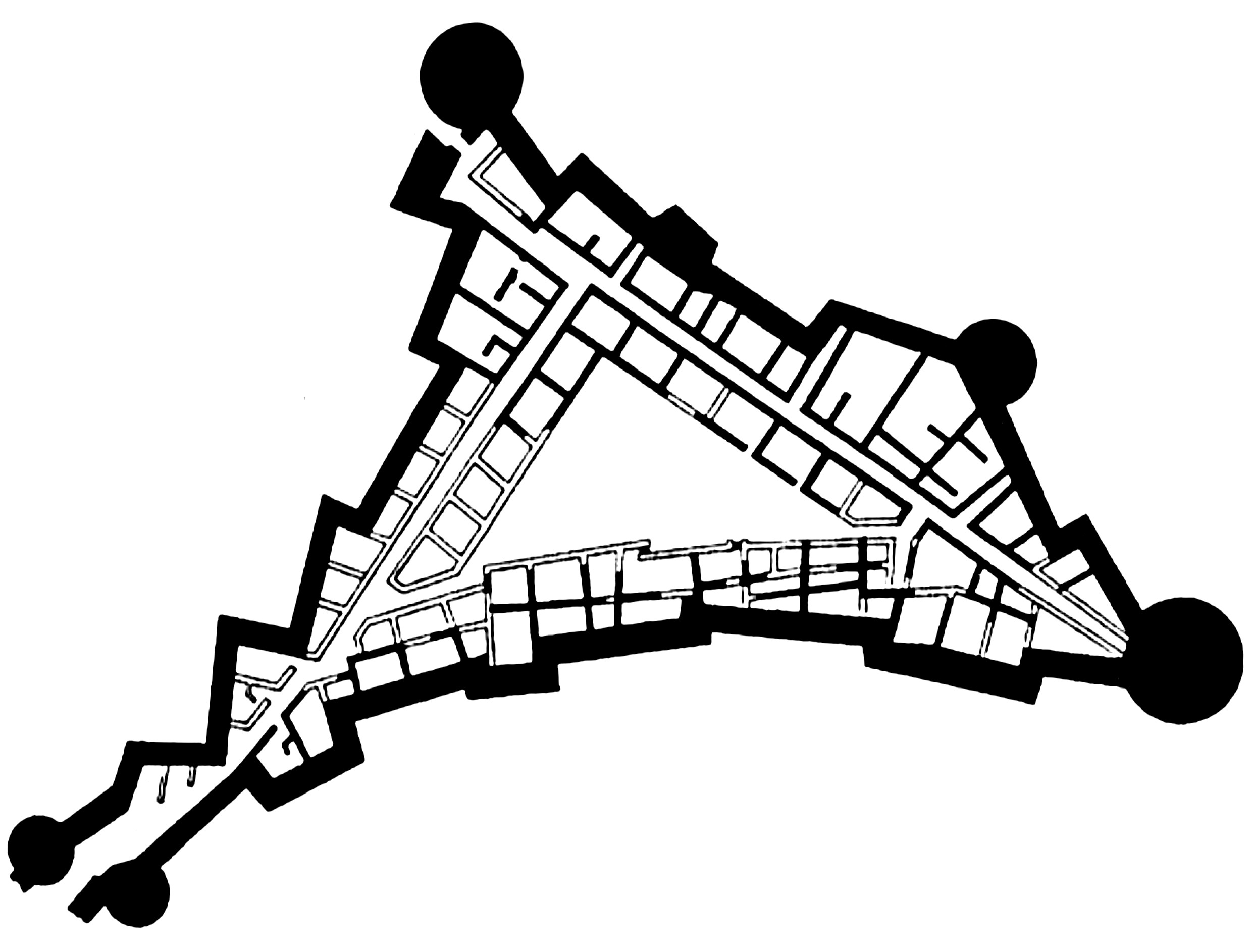
Plan of the northern fortress, Hill I, by Armen Tonikyan

King Artaxias I founded Artaxata as his new capital in 176 BC in the Ostan Hayotsʻ canton of the province of Ayrarat, on a peninsula of nine hills at the confluence of the Araks and Metsamor rivers. Archaeological evidence may indicate that Artaxata was built upon the remains of an older Urartian settlement.

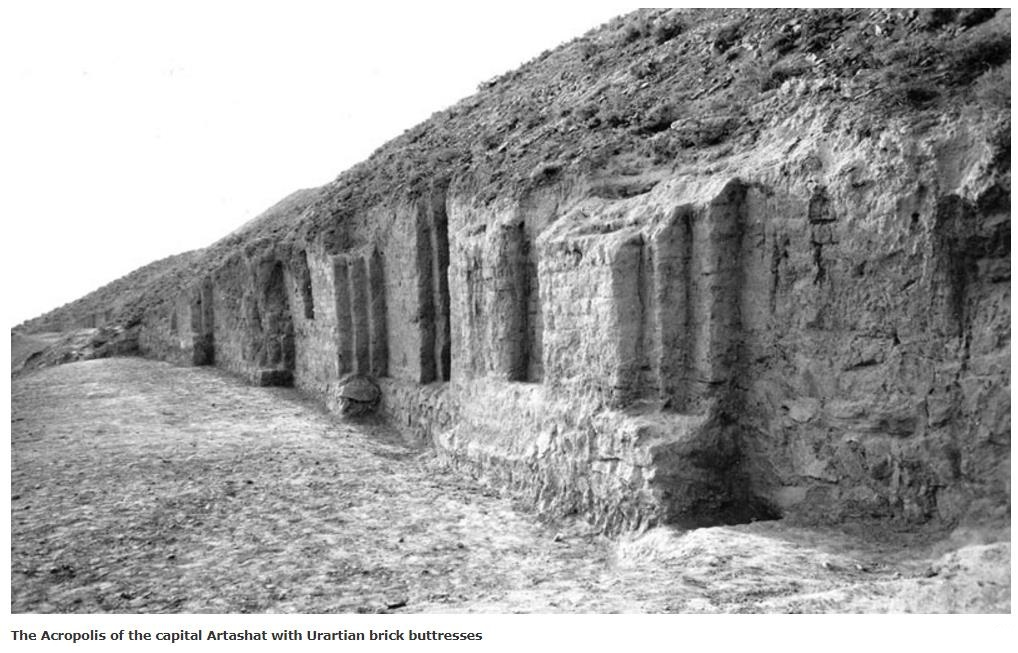
Old photograph of the excavations of Artaxata with the Urartian buildings

The story of its foundation is given by the Armenian historian Movses Khorenatsi: "Artashes [Artaxias] traveled to the confluence of the Yeraskh and Metsamor [rivers] and, taking a liking to the hill there, he chose it as the location of his new city, naming it after himself." The Greek historians Plutarch and Strabo relate an apocryphal story according to which the site of Artaxata was chosen on the advice of the Carthaginian general Hannibal. There is, however, no direct evidence to support this story.

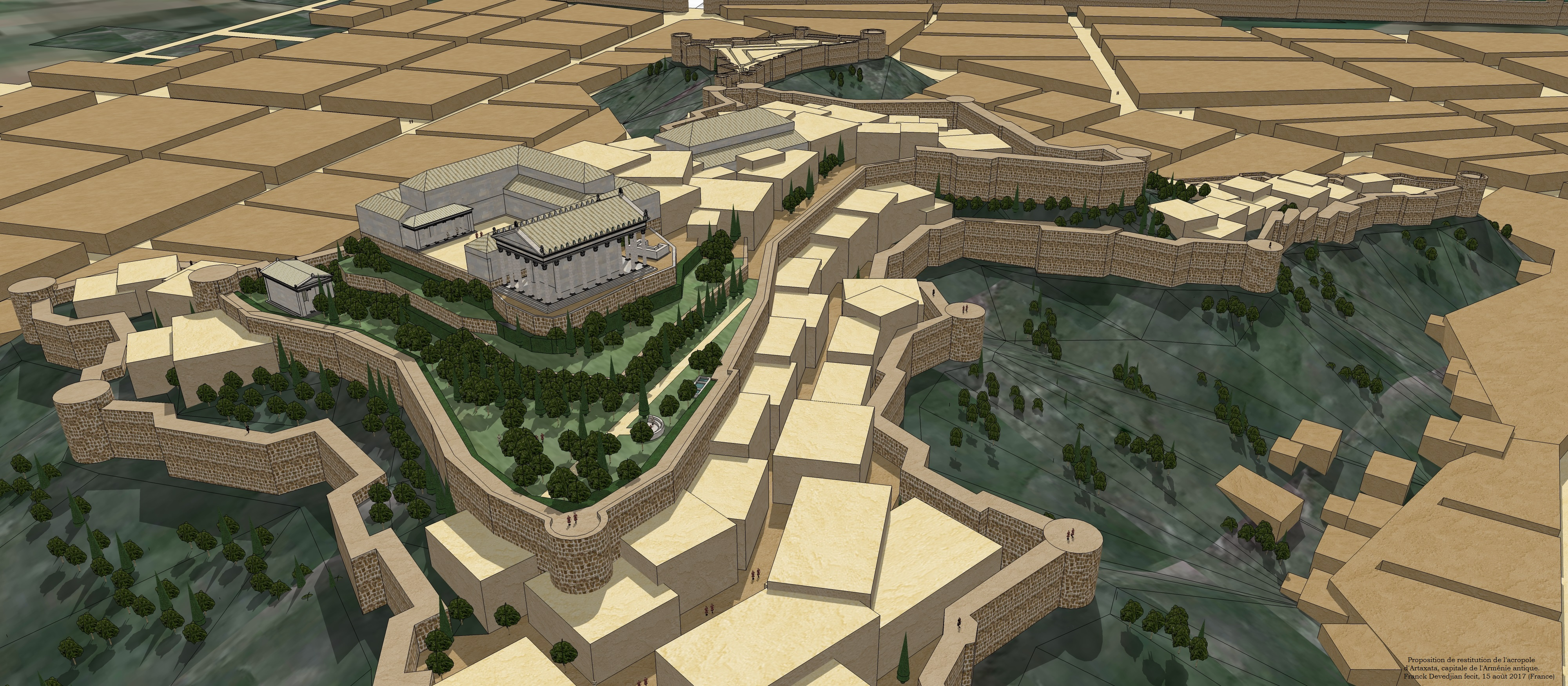
Model of the acropolis of Artaxata

Artaxias I built Artaxata's citadel on the height later called Khor Virap (best known as the location where Gregory the Illuminator was imprisoned by Tiridates III of Armenia) and added other fortifications, including a moat.

Strabo and Plutarch describe Artaxata as a large and beautiful city and call it the "Armenian Carthage." Excavations have revealed that Artaxata was a major urban center with paved streets, numerous bathhouses, markets, workshops and administrative buildings. The city had its own treasury, mint and customs house. A focal point of Hellenistic culture in Armenia, Armenia's first theater was built here. Movses Khorenatsi writes that numerous pagan copper statues of the gods and goddesses of Anahit, Artemis and Tir were brought to Artaxata from the religious center of Bagaran and other regions, and that Jews from the former Armenian capital of Armavir were relocated to the new capital.

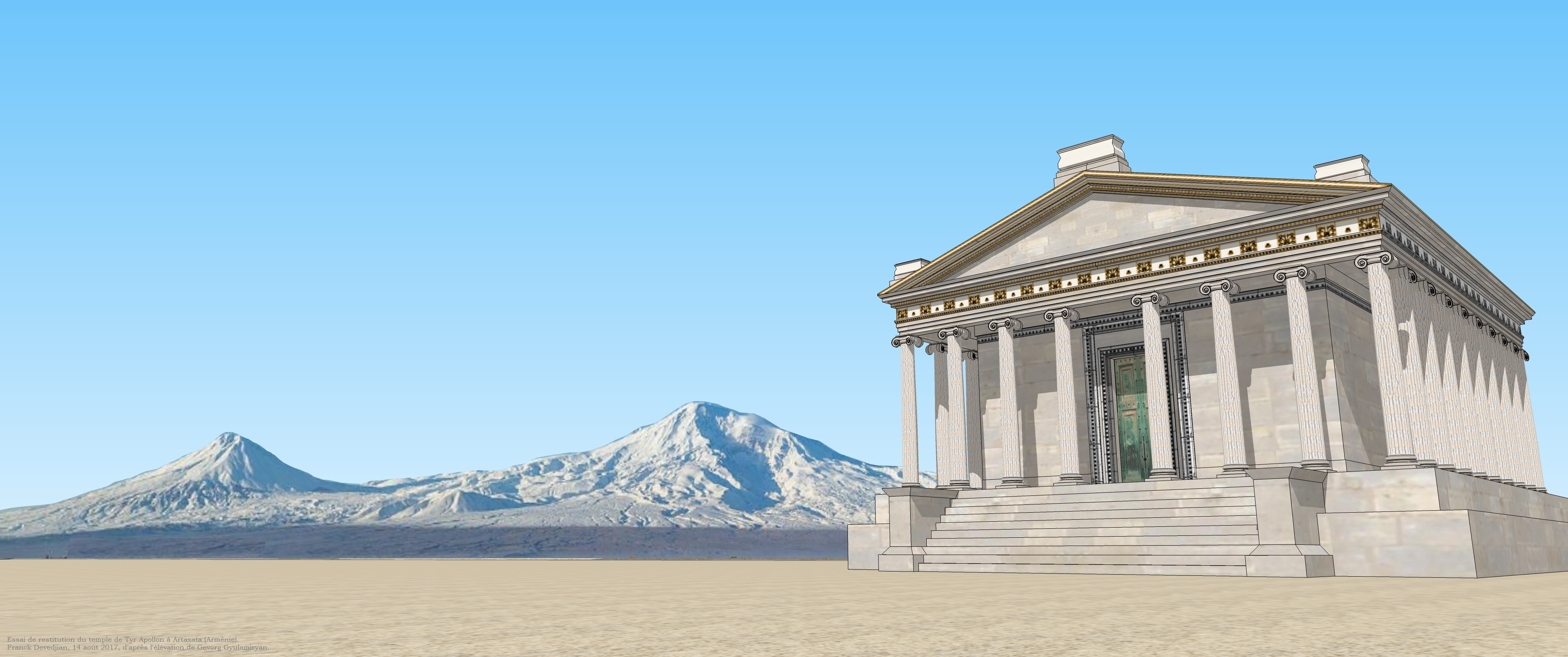
An artist's reconstruction of the temple of Tir-Apollo of Artaxata, located in the lower city, near the Araks River

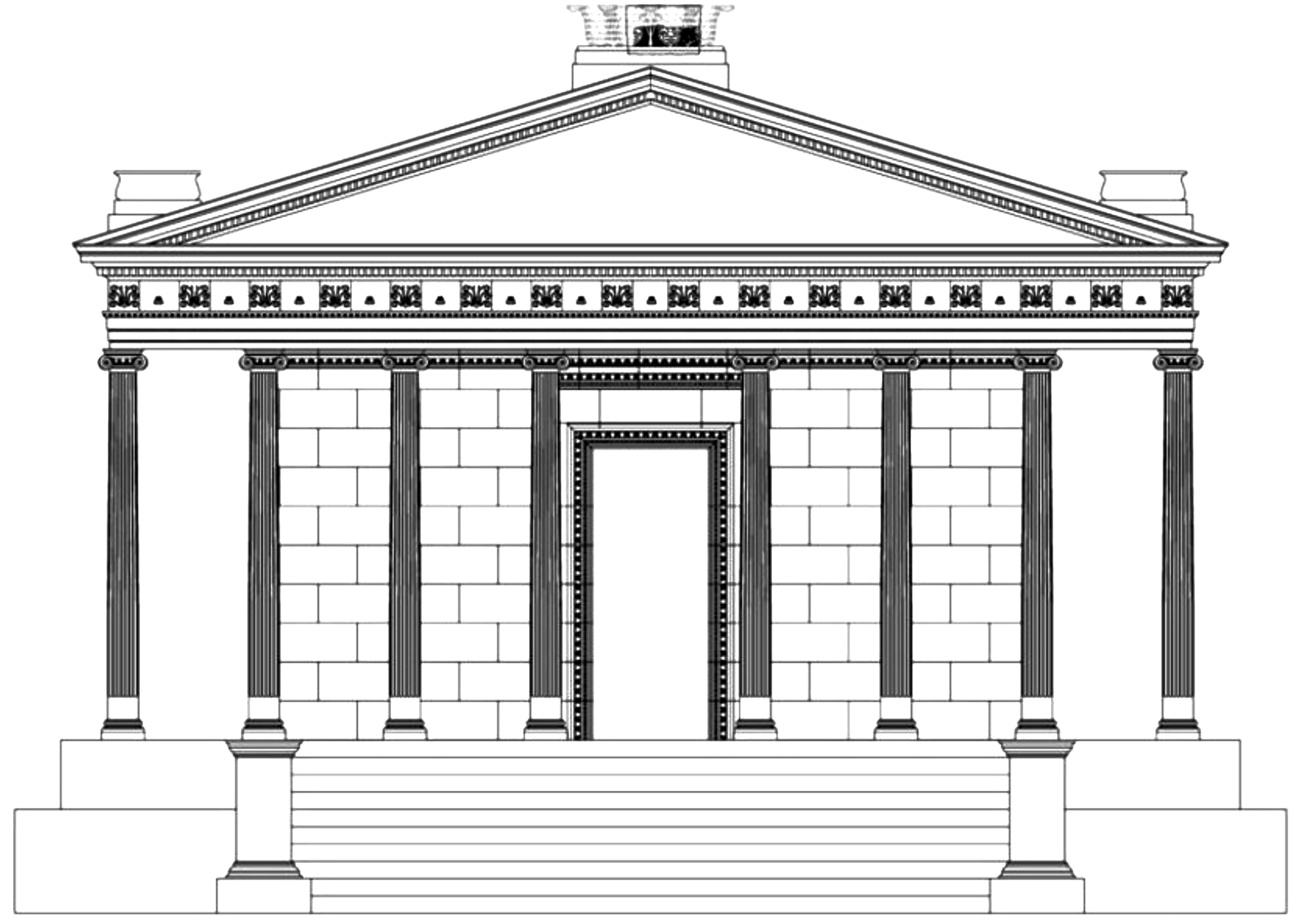
A reconstruction of the Temple of Tir-Apollo, by Gevorg Gyulamiryan

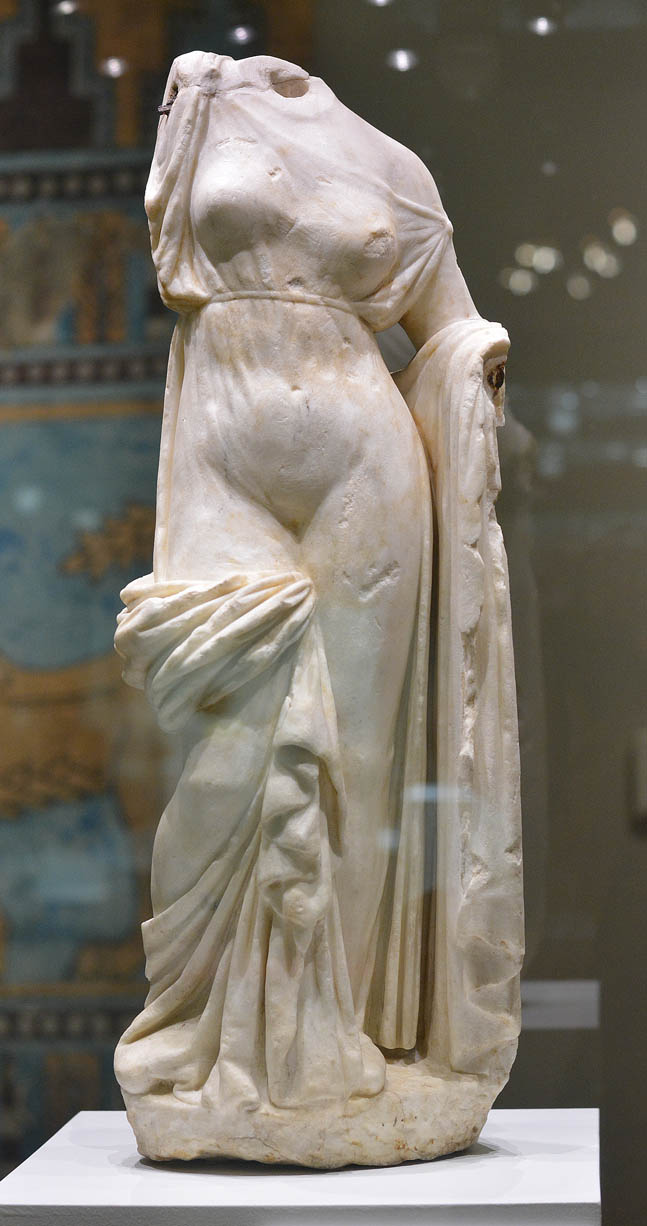
Statue of the goddess Astgik from Artaxata, 2nd–1st century BC

Due to its advantageous position, Artaxata soon became an important junction on the trade routes linking Persia and Mesopotamia with the Caucasus, the Black Sea ports and Asia Minor, contributing to its growth and prosperity, as well as that of the surrounding region. The city had a population of several thousand, consisting of Armenians, Greeks, Jews, and Syrians who worked as artisans, craftsmen, and merchants.

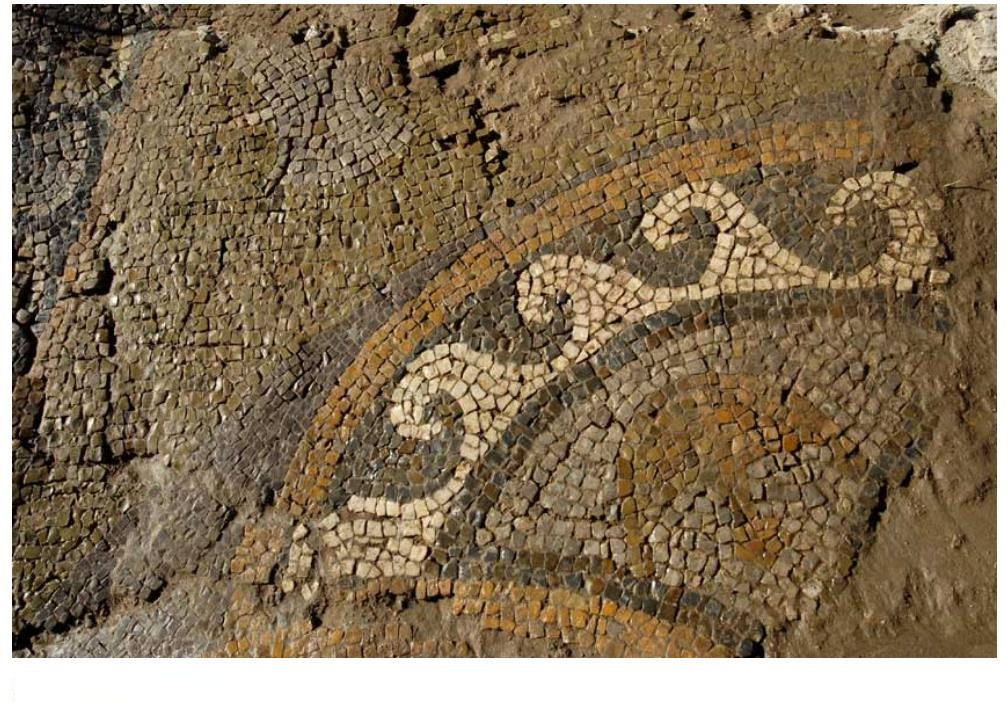
Mosaic in Artaxata

=== Wars against Romans and Persians ===
During the reign of Tigranes II, the Armenian kingdom was expanded to include many territories to the south and west, ultimately reaching the Mediterranean Sea. Due to the remoteness of Artaxata within the expanded empire, Tigranes built a new capital called Tigranocerta in the region of Arzanene. However, in 69 BC, the Roman general Lucullus invaded Armenia, defeated Tigranes' forces in the outskirts of Tigranocerta and sacked the new capital. As the harassed Roman forces continued to move northeast in pursuit of the Armenian king, a second prominent battle took place, this time near Artaxata where, according to Roman sources, Tigranes II was defeated once again, although Lucullus was forced to turn back to Mesopotamia by the threat of mutiny and never took the city. Artaxata successfully withstood an assault by the Parthians allied with Tigranes's son, but then faced another attack by Pompey. In order to save Artaxata, Tigranes submitted to the Romans and gave up most of the territories which he had conquered.

The city remained a hotly contested military target for the next two centuries. Mark Antony marched on Artaxata in 34 BC and took King Artavasdes II captive. In AD 58–59, it was occupied and razed to the ground by Capadocian legions under the Roman general Gnaeus Domitius Corbulo during the first, short-lived, Roman conquest of Armenia. After Emperor Nero recognized Tiridates I as king of Armenia in AD 66, he granted him 50 million sesterces and sent architects and construction experts to aid in the reconstruction of the ruined city. The city was temporarily renamed Neroneia, in honor of its sponsor.

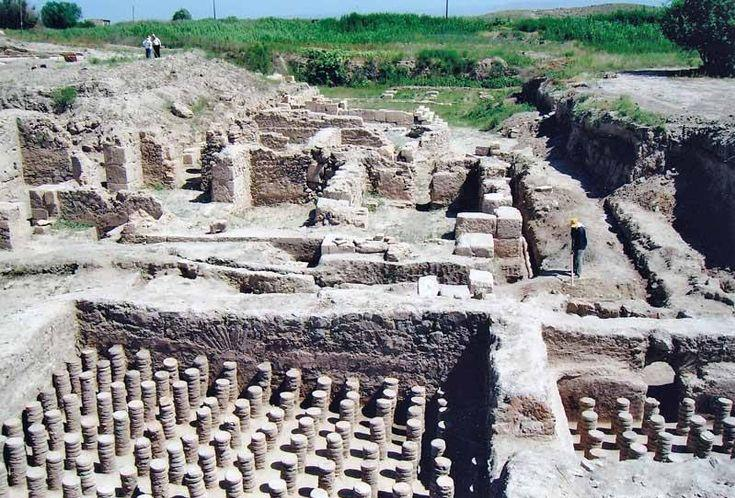
Excavation of the baths of Artaxata

The Roman emperor Trajan conquered Armenia in 115/6 and briefly made it a Roman province. The Romans established a garrison at Artaxata during this time, as has been proved by the discovery of Latin inscription there mentioning Trajan.

Latin inscription of Trajan's 4th Legion found north of the city, outside the wall of AD 116

After Trajan's death, the Romans led by Statius Priscus invaded Armenia and destroyed Artaxata in 163/64. After this, Artaxata was replaced by Vagharshapat as the capital of Armenia, at least temporarily. In the mid-3rd century, during the reign of Khosrov III the Small, the royal court was moved to Duin. In the late 360s, Artaxata was thoroughly destroyed by the invading army of Sasanian king Shapur II, along with the other cities of Armenia. Following the partition of Armenia between Sasanian Iran and the Eastern Roman Empire, Artaxata became one of three authorized points for trade between the two empires.

In 449, prior to the Armenian rebellion of 450–451, the political and religious leaders of Christian Armenia convened a council at Artaxata to discuss the threats of the Sasanian king Yazdegerd II. During the rebellion, the city was destroyed again by pro-Sasanian Armenian forces. With the rise in prominence of Duin as the capital and chief city of Armenia, Artaxata rapidly declined. The changing courses of the Araks and Mestamor rivers and consequent flooding probably led to the settlement's final abandonment.

== Archaeological research ==
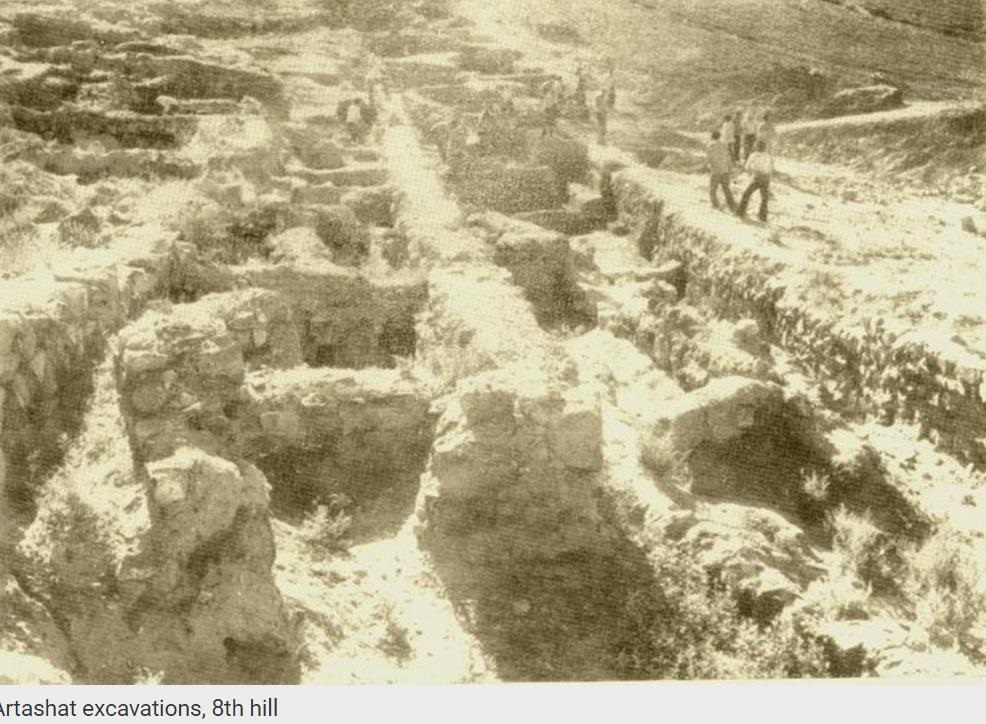
Excavations at Hill 8 of Artaxata

The exact location of ancient Artaxata was identified during the 1920s. Archaeological excavations, however, only begun in 1970. The archaeological site is 8 kilometres (5.0 mi) south of the modern city of Artashat, near the monastery of Khor Virap.

=== 4th-century church ===
In 2024, a team of archaeologists from Armenia and Germany discovered in Artaxata the remains of Armenia's oldest known church. The octagonal structure had square extensions on four sides, giving it an overall cruciform plan. Remains of wooden platforms found in the extensions were carbon dated to the mid-fourth century. The legend of Armenia's Christianisation dates that event to 301, which underlines the very early date of the Artaxata church. Its octagonal plan suggests a martyrion built over the tomb of a Christian saint; the saint's name however has been lost.

== Bibliography ==
- Bournoutian, George A. (2003). A Concise History of the Armenian People: From Ancient Times to the Present (2nd ed.). Costa Mesa, CA: Mazda Publishers. ISBN 1-56859-141-1.
- Chaumont, M. L. (1986). "Armenia and Iran ii. The pre-Islamic period". In Yarshater, Ehsan (ed.). Encyclopædia Iranica. Vol. II/4: Architecture IV–Armenia and Iran IV. London and New York: Routledge & Kegan Paul. pp. 418–438. ISBN 978-0-71009-104-8.
- Garsoïan, Nina (1997a). "The Aršakuni Dynasty". In Hovannisian, Richard G. (ed.). The Armenian People from Ancient to Modern Times. Vol. 1. New York: St. Martin's Press. pp. 63–94. ISBN 0-312-10169-4.
- Garsoïan, Nina (1997b). "The Emergence of Armenia". In Hovannisian, Richard G. (ed.). The Armenian People from Ancient to Modern Times. Vol. 1. New York: St. Martin's Press. pp. 37–62. ISBN 0-312-10169-4.
- Hewsen, R. H. (1986). "Artaxata". In Yarshater, Ehsan (ed.). Encyclopædia Iranica. Vol. II/6: Art in Iran I–ʿArūż. London and New York: Routledge & Kegan Paul. pp. 653–654. ISBN 978-0-71009-106-2.
- Movses Khorenatsʻi (1997). Hayotsʻ Patmutʻyun (PDF) (in Armenian). Translation and commentary by Stepʻan Malkhasyantsʻ. Erevan: "Hayastan" Hratarakchʻutʻyun.
- Plutarch (1914). "The Life of Lucullus". Plutarch, Lives, Volume II. Loeb Classical Library. Translated by Perrin, Bernadotte.
- Strabo (1924). Jones, H. L. (ed.). The Geography of Strabo. Cambridge, Mass.: Harvard University Press.
- Tiratsʻyan, G. (1976). "Artashat". In Hambardzumyan, Viktor (ed.). Soviet Armenian Encyclopedia (in Armenian). Vol. 2. Erevan. pp. 135–136.
