= Ervandakert =

Ancient Armenian city

- Երուանդակերտ (Armenian)
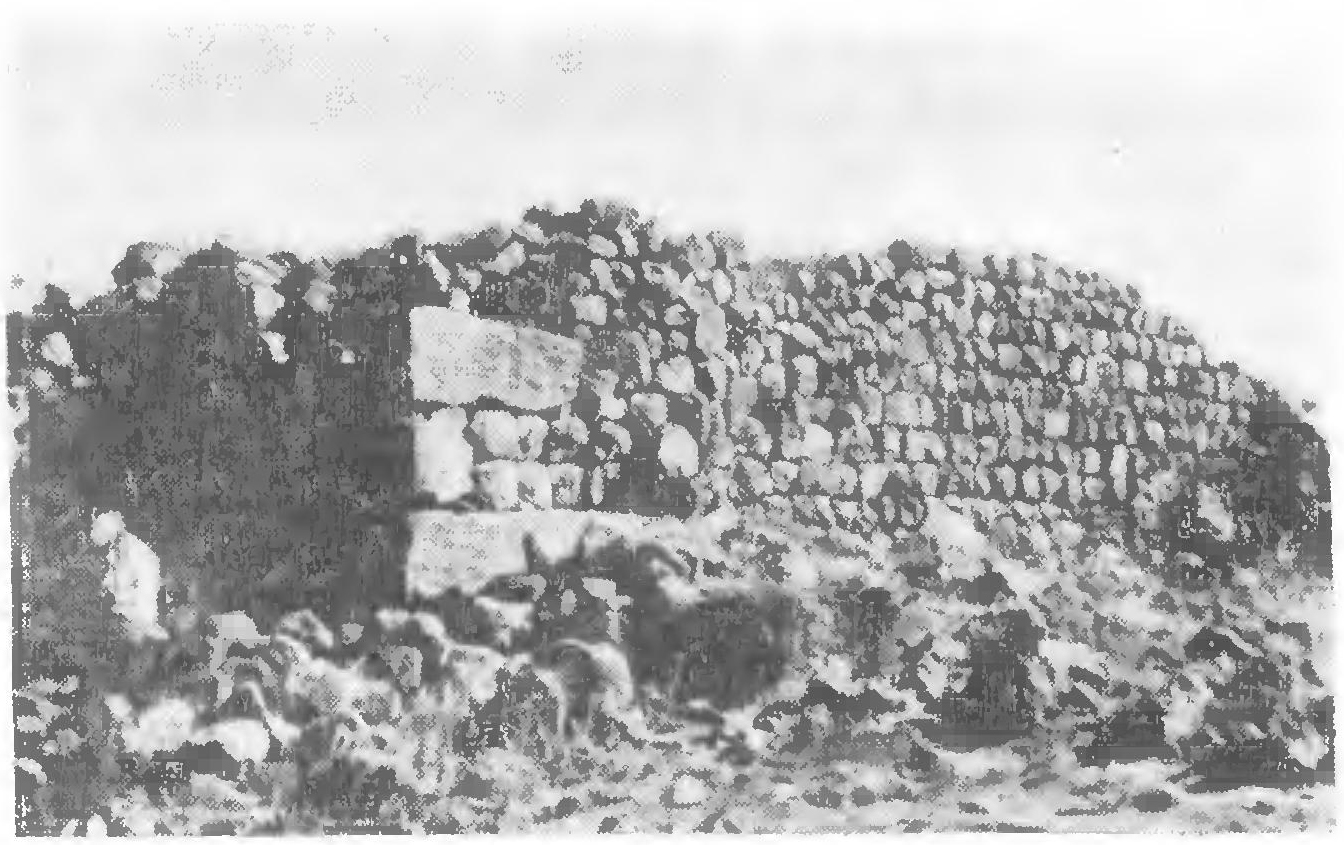
- The ruins of building in Ervandakert
- Interactive map of Ervandakert
- 40°04′07″N 43°54′20″E

History
- Built: c. 200 BC
- Built by: Orontes IV

Ervandakert (Armenian: Երվանդակերտ (reformed); Երուանդակերտ (classical)) was an ancient Armenian city built by the last king of Orontid dynasty Orontes IV (Ervand IV) in the 3rd century BC.

== Etymology ==
Foreigners named the city Aghjaghala or Ağça-kala, which translates as "white fortress".

== History ==
The settlement was built at the end of the 3rd century BC and the beginning of the 2nd century BC by the last king of the Orontid dynasty, Orontes IV (Ervand IV). It was a fortress and was on the Akhurian river; there are traces of the ancient bridge connecting Yervandashat to the fortress of Ervandakert built by the same ruler on the opposite bank of the river by a stone bridge. This is how Armenian historian Movses Khorenatsi described the city:

I am pleased to tell you about the wonderful manor Ervandakert, established by the same Ervand with grace and splendor. He inhabits the middle part of the vast valley with people and builds up buildings that amuse the eye, as bright as the apple of the eye. The manor is bordered by fragrant flower beds. Like the pupil the eye's entire circumference. Abundant vineyards are like a circle of thick, beautiful eyelashes. The arched arrangement (of the lands) of the north side is truly comparable to the high eyebrows of a lovely maiden. The evenness of the fields on the south side is reminiscent of the smoothness of fine cheeks. With the banks rising like orifice, the river forms the shape of two petals of the lips. And this magnificent area seems to be looking with an unblinking gaze at the royal residence towering over everything. A truly fertile and regal manor!
