= Tandzut =

Tandzut or Tandzout may refer to:

- Tandzut, Armavir, Armenia
- Tandzut, Tavush, Armenia
- Tandzut River, Armenia
