= Bagaran (ancient city) =

- Բագարան (Armenian)
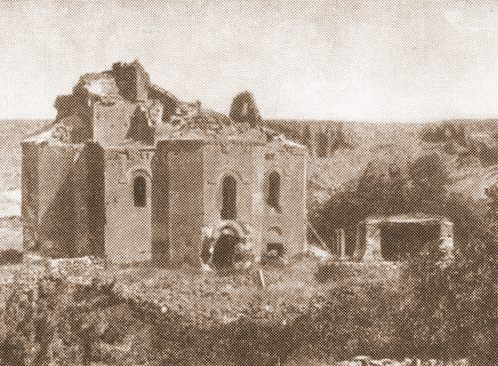
- Saint Theodore Church of Bagaran, before 1923

- Location within Turkey
- 40°12′06″N 43°39′17″E
- Location: Partly on the site of the Turkish village of Kılıttaşı near the border with Armenia, Kars Province, Turkey

History
- Built: 3rd century BC
- Built by: King Orontes IV of Armenia
- Abandoned: 1394

Bagaran (Armenian: Բագարան) was a city in ancient Armenia founded during the reign of the Orontid dynasty. It is one of the historical capitals of ancient Armenia. Throughout various historical periods, it served as the primary religious center of Urartu.

== Geographical location and toponyms ==
The fortress-city of Bagaran (also referred to in historical sources as a fortress, town, castle, or city) was located in the Arsharunik canton of the Ayrarat province of Greater Armenia, near the confluence of the Akhuryan and Aras rivers (on the right bank of the Akhuryan). It was situated south of the village of Mren and approximately 8–9 kilometers (according to Movses Khorenatsi, about forty asparameters or stadia) north of the historical capital city of Yervandashat.

The city was surrounded on three sides by the steep gorge of the Akhuryan River. This topographical feature provided a strategic advantage for robust defense against enemy incursions.

In later periods, the waters from the springs located within the territory of Bagaran were utilized to operate watermills. The city featured orchards and an artificial forest-park. Furthermore, the natural and artificial caves in the surrounding valleys and gorges were also utilized for military and defensive purposes.

== History ==
=== Founding and pagan period ===
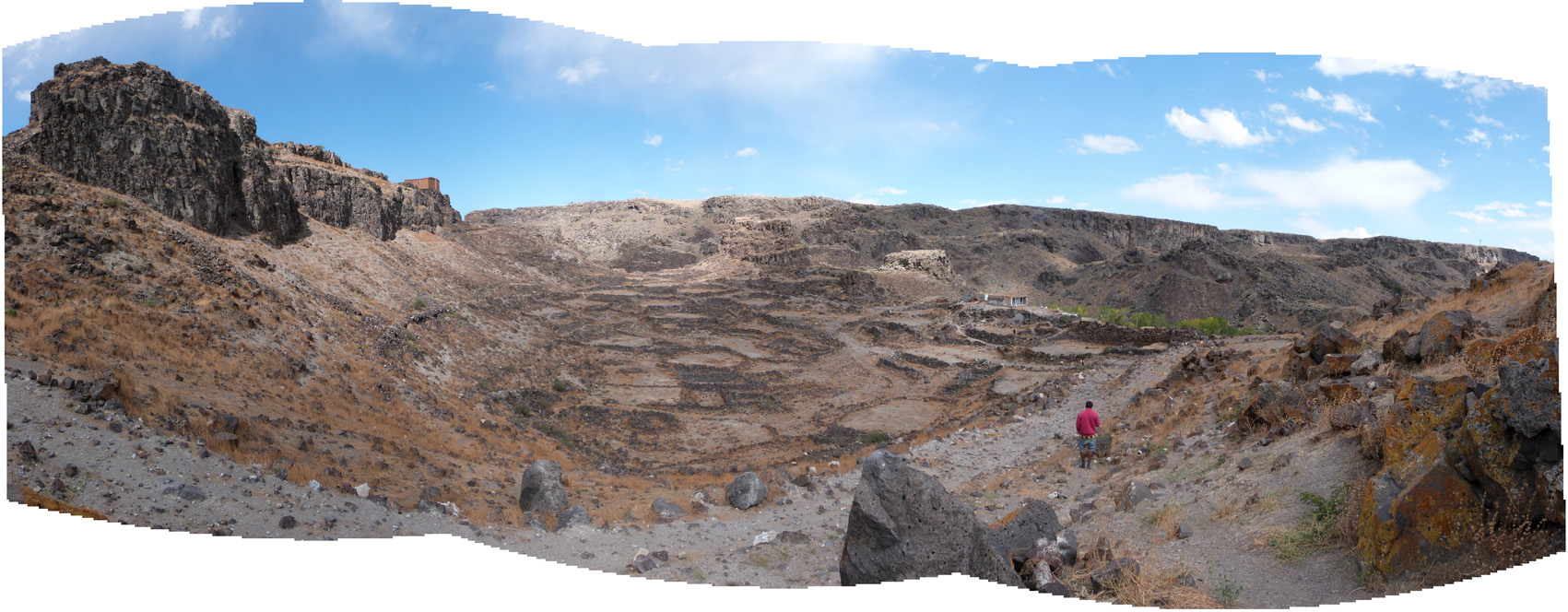
Archaeological site of Bagaran

Bagaran was founded at the end of the third century BC or the beginning of the second century BC by King Orontes IV of Armenia. An account of its founding is given by the Armenian historian Movses Khorenatsi (5th century AD or later). The new city was built to house the images of the gods (Bagaran literally means "the god's place") and the ancestors of the king, previously held at the holy city of Armavir. Orontes IV constructed pagan temples in Bagaran and appointed his brother, Eruaz, as the high priest. Orontes also had a forest of fir trees planted near the city, which was subsequently enclosed by walls and converted into a royal hunting ground called Tsnndots ("Genesis"). Most likely, the forest played the same role as the Sosyats (plane tree) forest of Armavir, where priests performed divinations based on the rustling of the trees' leaves. Vestiges of the Tsnndots forest have survived to the present day in the form of shrublands.

=== The campaign of Artaxias I and the decline of the city ===
Orontes IV was overthrown by Artaxias I, who was probably a member of a different branch of the ruling Orontid dynasty of Armenia. According to Khorenatsi's semi-legendary account, Artaxias' ally Smbat went to Bagaran and killed the high priest Eruaz, replacing him with a relative of Artaxias. Smbat took Eruaz's treasures and five hundred of his slaves to Artaxias. Smbat settled these five hundred slaves "behind Masis [i.e. Mount Ararat]", creating a settlement also called Bagaran. The pagan idols were subsequently transferred to Artaxias' newly established capital of Artaxata (Artashat). According to Robert H. Hewsen, despite the removal of its idols to Artaxata "Bagaran remained an important cult center until the conversion of Armenia to Christianity." Other scholars write that it lost its political and social role; Tadevos Hakobyan notes that it is not mentioned again in Armenian sources for more than a thousand years. During the second half of the sixth century, Bagaran, along with the entire canton of Arsharunik, became the property of the Kamsarakan princes.

=== The Bagratid period ===
The Bagratid (Bagratuni) princes acquired Bagaran in the 9th century, when the Bagratuni prince Ashot Msaker purchased the holdings of the Kamsarakan princes. Bagaran became a princely residence, and after the establishment of the Bagratid kingdom of Armenia in 885, it served as the capital of the first Bagratuni king Ashot I (r. 885–890). His successor, Smbat I (r. 890–913), moved the capital from Bagaran to Shirakavan in 890. Under Bagratid rule, Bagaran remained one of the prosperous centers of the Armenian kingdom. Many Bagratuni rulers, including Ashot I, are buried in Bagaran.

Throughout the existence of their dynasty, the Bagratunis held four different capital cities (Bagaran, Shirakavan, Kars, and Ani); however, Bagaran maintained its economic and cultural significance from the 8th to the 11th centuries. During this period, major civil and ecclesiastical construction projects were carried out in the city.

=== Foreign incursions and final decline ===
However, in 1045, Bagaran, along with the Armenian capital of Ani, was invaded by the Byzantines. In 1064, the city was attacked and heavily destroyed by the Seljuk Turks. During the twelfth century, the Shah-Armens took over Bagaran.

In 1211, the joint Armeno-Georgian forces led by the Zakarid princes liberated Bagaran. Over the following few decades, the city's prosperity began to recover; however, this resurgence was interrupted in 1236 by the Mongol-Tatar invasions, as a consequence of which the city entered a period of rapid decline.

In 1394, Bagaran was finally destroyed by Tamerlane. Following this invasion, the city was never rebuilt; during the 14th and 15th centuries, it was reduced to a heap of ruins, and the modest settlement that persisted within the area lost its former urban significance.

== Architecture and monuments ==
Traces of the pagan temples and other structures constructed by King Orontes IV were preserved until the early 20th century. At the turn of the century, while digging foundations for new houses on the hill known as "Mijin Gyugh" (Middle Village), the villagers of Bagaran frequently discovered pagan-era graves, small stone idols, and other antiquities. Within the territory of the historical city, various remnants have survived in various states of preservation, including defensive walls, distinct sections of the fortress, a tower, a partially ruined royal balcony, the remains of a bridge and residential dwellings, traces of cemeteries, as well as a secret underground passage leading from the ancient fortress to the Akhuryan․

=== Citadel ===
The citadel of Bagaran was situated on the southwestern side of the defensive wall, atop the highest of the three rocky cliffs. Built with dressed stones, the citadel featured defensive bastions adorned with bas-reliefs. The remnants of the Bagratuni royal palaces were located within this area. The other two hills of the city were also fortified with walls, where the traces of structures with vaulted rooms have been preserved.

=== Cathedrals ===
The existence of five Armenian churches is recorded within the territory of Bagaran, four of which are explicitly mentioned in historical sources. More than ten inscriptions have been preserved on the walls of these structures, including lapidary inscriptions dating back to 956 and 1034 AD. The inscription from 1034 AD mentions a priest named Vahan, who referred to himself as a gtsogh (calligrapher).

=== St. Theodore Church ===
Its construction was initiated in 624 AD by Prince But Aravenyan and completed in 631 AD by his wife, Princess Anna. Until a later period, the cathedral remained standing, though it lacked its dome. Featuring a cross-shaped design both internally and externally, its architectural composition aligns with the Etchmiadzin Cathedral. According to architectural historians, the structural elements of Saint Theodore influenced the architecture of several European buildings through the mediation of Byzantium (such as the Oratory of Germigny-des-Prés in Orléans, Santa Maria presso San Satiro in Milan, the Nea Ekklesia of the Imperial Palace in Constantinople, and the Great Lavra on Mount Athos). The cathedral's lapidary inscriptions are engraved on the exterior walls, beginning from the northern side of the western apse and extending across the northern, eastern, and southern facades.

=== St. George Church ===
Located on the northern side of the citadel. It was constructed in 1030 AD during the reign of Catholicos Peter I of Armenia and King Hovhannes-Smbat. The church featured ornately carved khachkars. Throughout history, it was destroyed and rebuilt multiple times. The only surviving photograph of the church was taken by Karapet Hovhanjanyan in 1884.

=== St Shushanik Church ===
Located on the high grounds of the left bank of the Akhuryan. Its geographical coordinates correspond to 40° 12' 52" N latitude and 43° 39' 46" E longitude, sitting at an elevation of 1,160 meters above sea level. In the spring of 1909, while surveying and studying the cathedrals of Tekor, Yererouk, Mren, and Bagaran, the prominent architectural theorist Toros Toramanian briefly documented this hexa-apsidal (six-apsed) church. He characterized it as an octagonal church surrounded by a fortified wall with bastions (currently ruined) and tentatively dated it to the 11th century. The Shushanavank monument complex consists of hexa-apsidal and tetra-apsidal (four-apsed) churches, a single-nave chapel, a defensive wall, and the remnants of eastern auxiliary structures. Overall, the architectural decoration of the monument is highly restrained. The dome's drum, which features a circular layout both internally and externally, is crowned internally by a spherical dome and externally by a conical roof. The church has two entrances, opening from the western and southwestern apses. On the exterior, these entrances feature simple portals crowned with rectangular pilasters and arches. According to local tradition, Shushanik, the young daughter of an Armenian prince, went missing while wandering in the vicinity of Bagaran and was never found. In response, her father constructed a church on the left bank of the Akhuryan River, presumably at the exact site where she disappeared. According to another legend, a noble lady from Bagaran named Shushan, who resided on the left bank of the Akhuryan, once arrived late for divine liturgy; consequently, she commissioned the construction of a new church and named it Shushanavank.

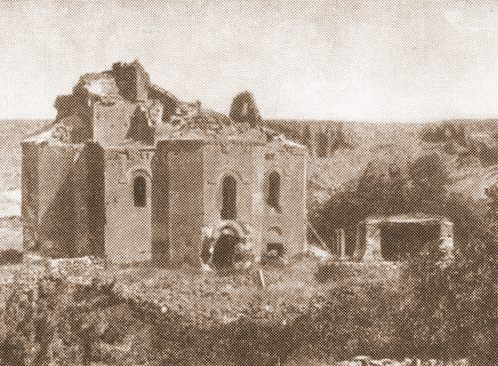
St Theodore Church

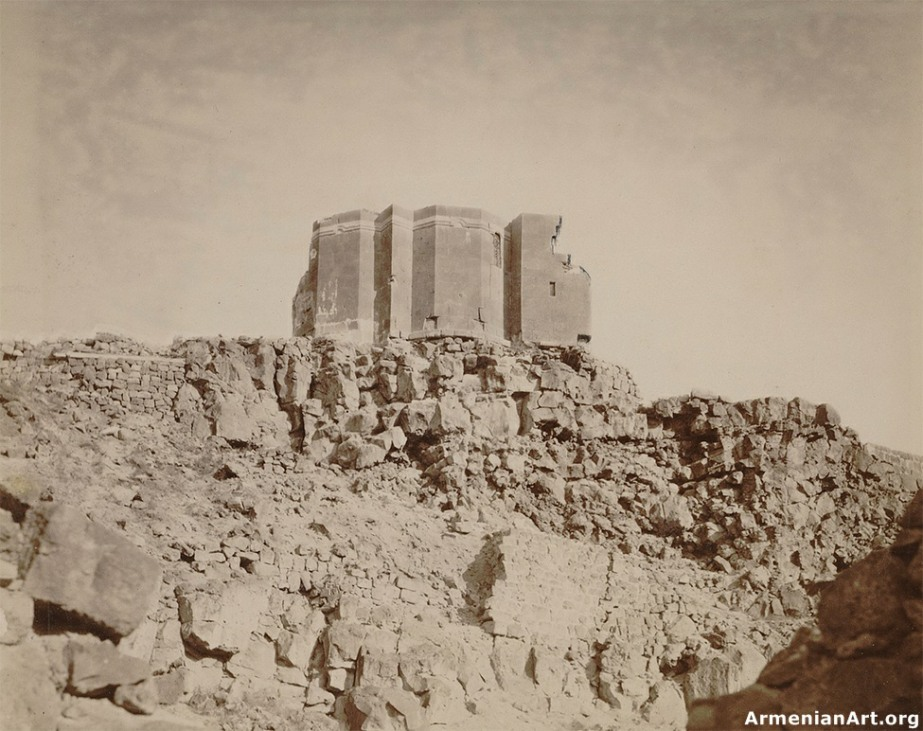
St George Church

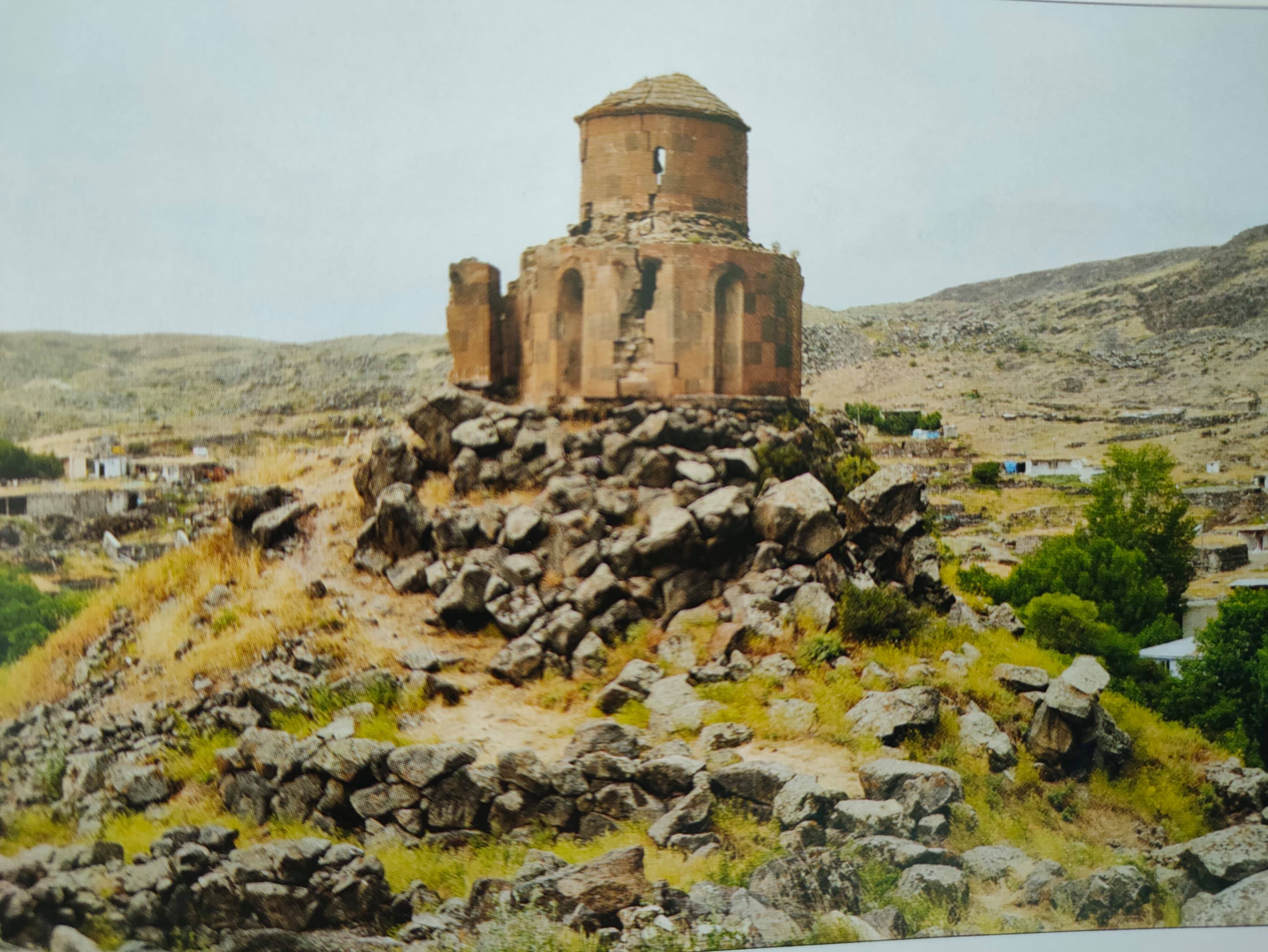
St Shushanik Church

== Modern history ==
At the beginning of the twentieth century, there was an Armenian-populated village near the site of ancient Bagaran with a population of slightly over 300. In 1920, as a result of the Turkish–Armenian War, the territories of the Republic of Armenia located west of the Akhurian River were captured by Turkey. The small group of the Armenian survivors of Bagaran crossed the river to the eastern bank and founded the modern village of Bagaran within the Armenian SSR, just 8 km south of the site of the ancient city.

Nowadays, a small Kurdish-populated village called Kilittaşı partially lies on the ruins of Bagaran, on the Turkish side of the closed border. As of 1928, its name was still Pakran.

According to the Armenian historian Joseph Orbeli, the Church of Saint Theodore of Bagaran was one of the most prominent examples of early medieval Armenian architecture. It was largely intact until 1920. However, it was deliberately destroyed by the Turkish authorities.
