= Vanand =

Historic region of Armenia (in present-day Turkey)

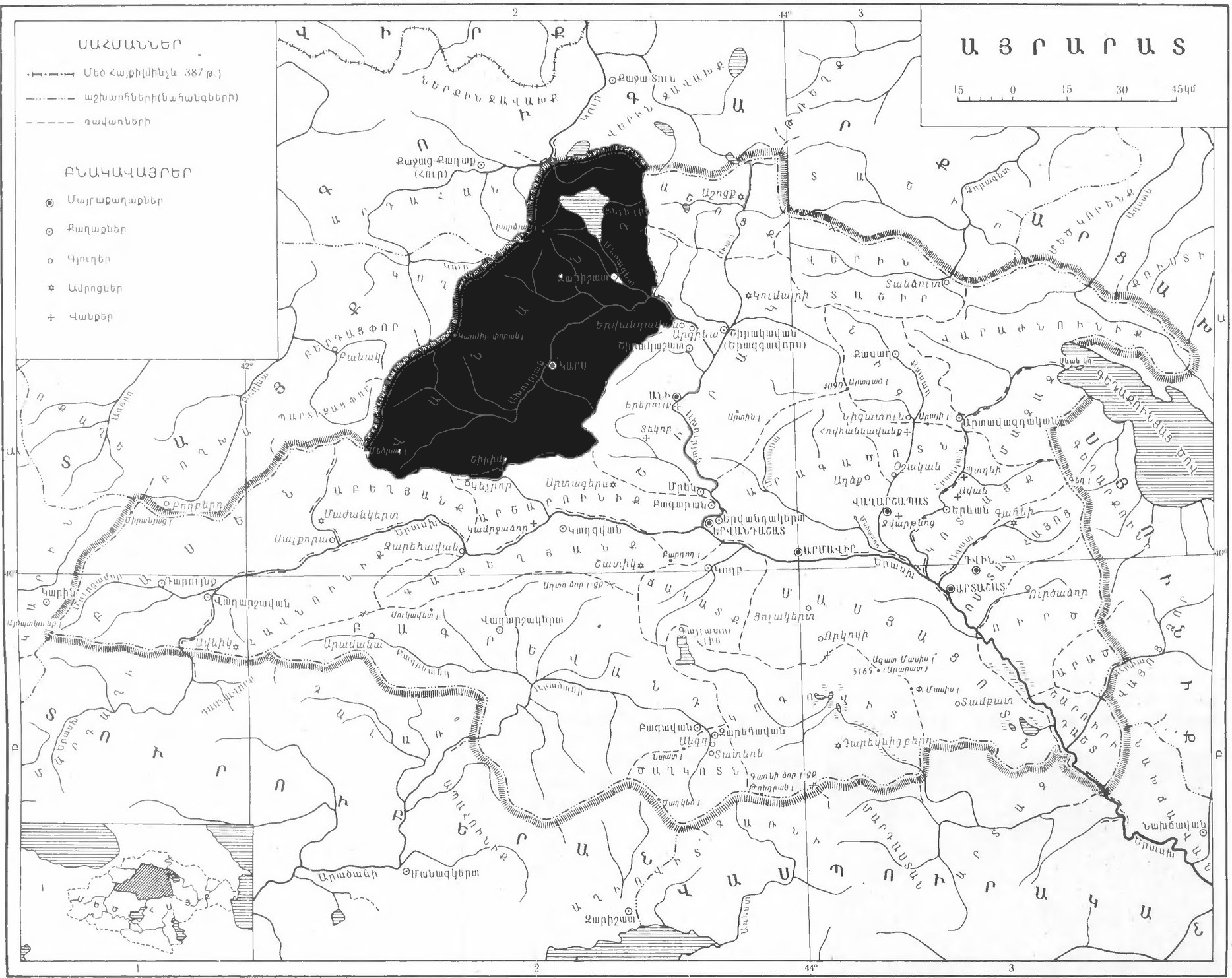
Vanand gavar in Great Armenia's Ayrarat marz

Vanand (Armenian: Վանանդ) is the area of historic Armenia that roughly corresponds to the Kars Province of present-day Turkey. Named after the Armenian family of Vanandi (derived from the Bulgar chieftain Vund), it was a principality of the Kingdom of Armenia and a later province of the Democratic Republic of Armenia. Its historic capital was the city of Kars.

The region fell to numerous invaders including the Assyrians, Greeks, Romans, Byzantines, Arabs, Mongols, Persians, and the Ottoman Turks. After the 1877-1878 Russo-Turkish War, the Russian Empire acquired the region at the Congress of Berlin. The area still retained a substantial Armenian population, but after World War I, most of it was decimated during the Turkish-Armenian War in 1920.

This region was passed to Turkish control by the Treaty of Alexandropol and the Treaty of Kars.' (Note: Turkish: Kars Antlaşması, Russian: Карсский договор, romanized: Karskii dogovor, Georgian: ყარსის ხელშეკრულება, Armenian: Կարսի պայմանագիր, romanized: Karsi paymanagir, Azerbaijani: Qars müqaviləsi)

== Princes of Vanand ==
- Until 451: Aravand Vanandi
- 451: Tathul Vanandi
- 480: Vren Vanandi

== See also ==
- Armavir region
- List of regions of old Armenia
- Kingdom of Vanand
