= Orontes IV =

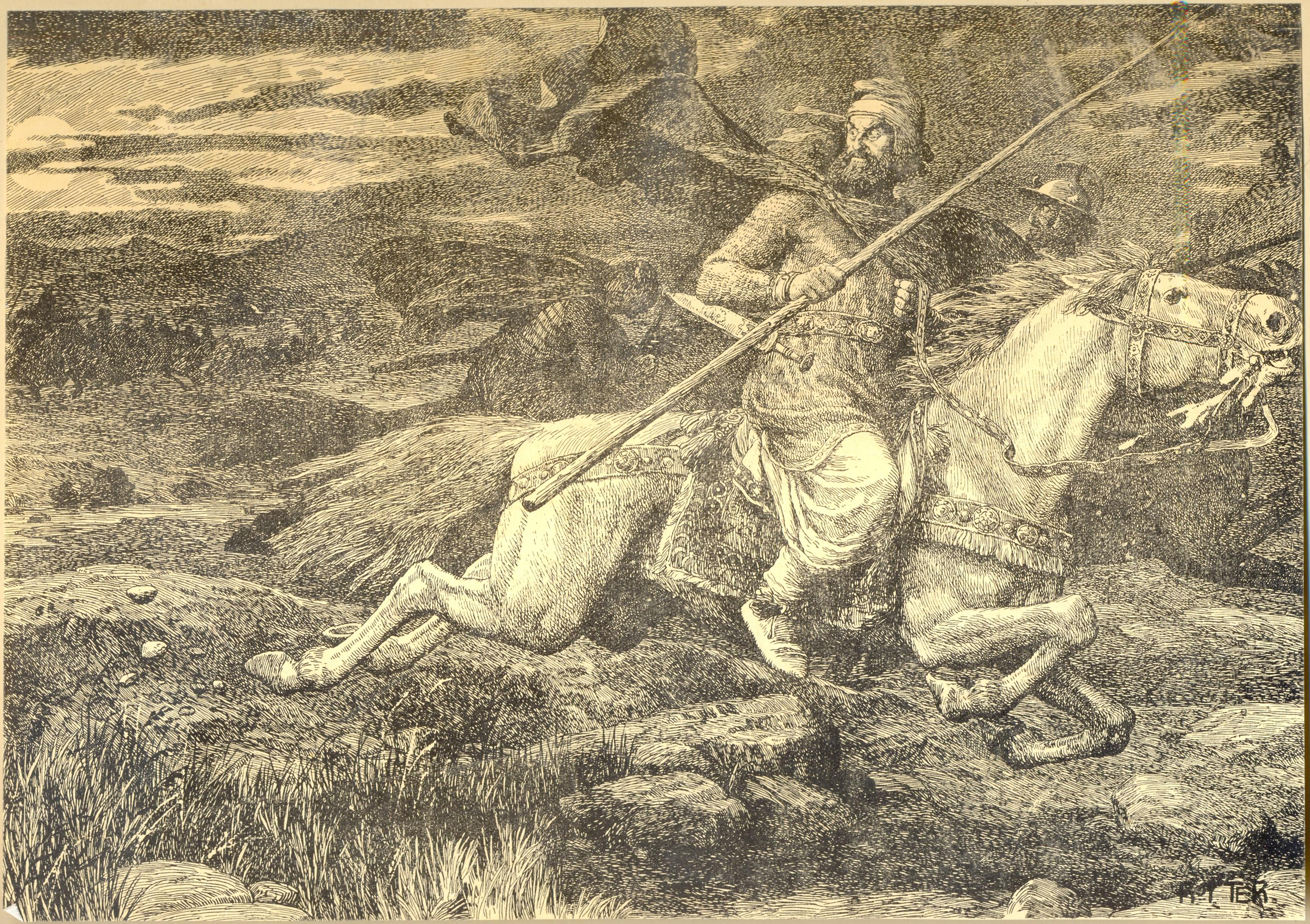
- Engraving of Orontes IV by Josef I. Rotter

King of Armenia
- Reign: 212 – 200 BC
- Coronation: 212 BC
- Successor: Artaxias I
- Died: 200 BC; Armenia
- Burial: Armavir
- Issue: Ptolemaeus of Commagene
- Dynasty: Orontid dynasty
- Father: Arsames I

Orontes IV (Old Persian: *Arvanta-) was the son of King Arsames and is recorded as ruling Armenia from inscriptions found at the historic capital of the Orontid dynasty, Armavir. He was the founder of the city of Yervandashat and Ervandakert. In his reign the religious site of Bagaran was founded. Large bronze statues in the Hellenistic style of the gods, Zeus (Aramazd), Artemis (Anahit) and Herakles (Vahagn) were brought there and set up in temples dedicated to them. He is also said to have founded a shrine at Armavir dedicated to Apollo (Mithra), a golden statue of four horses pulling a chariot with Apollo as god of the Sun. This was later destroyed by the Sassanid Persian army in the 4th century AD.

Antiochus III, King of the Seleucid Empire, instigated a revolt against Orontes, headed by Artaxias I. Aramaic inscriptions found at Armavir state that King Orontes IV died at the hands of his own army, in other words by betrayal from Artaxias I. Artaxias I was appointed as King of Armenia, by Antiochus.

Orontes IV had a son, Ptolemaeus of Commagene, who served as the last Satrap of Commagene between 201 and 163 BC, became in 163 BC the first King of Commagene and died in 130 BC.

== Sources ==
- Chahin, M. (1987). The Kingdom of Armenia. Dorset Press.
- Facella, Margherita (2021). "Orontids". In Yarshater, Ehsan (ed.). Encyclopædia Iranica (Online ed.). Encyclopædia Iranica Foundation.
- Marciak, Michał (2017). Sophene, Gordyene, and Adiabene: Three Regna Minora of Northern Mesopotamia Between East and West. BRILL. ISBN 9789004350724.
- Lang, David M. (2000). "Iran, Armenia and Georgia". In Yarshater, Ehsan (ed.). The Cambridge History of Iran. Vol. 3, Part 1:The Seleucid, Parthian, and Sasanian Periods. Cambridge University Press. pp. 505–536.512
