= Tandzut, Tavush =

Village in Tavush, Armenia

Tandzut
- Location within Armenia Location within Tavush
- Coordinates: 40°52′N 44°58′E
- Country: Armenia
- Marz (Province): Tavush
- Time zone: UTC+4 ( )

Tandzut (Armenian: Տանձուտ) is a village in the Tavush Province of Armenia.
