= Akhuryan (river) =

River in Armenia

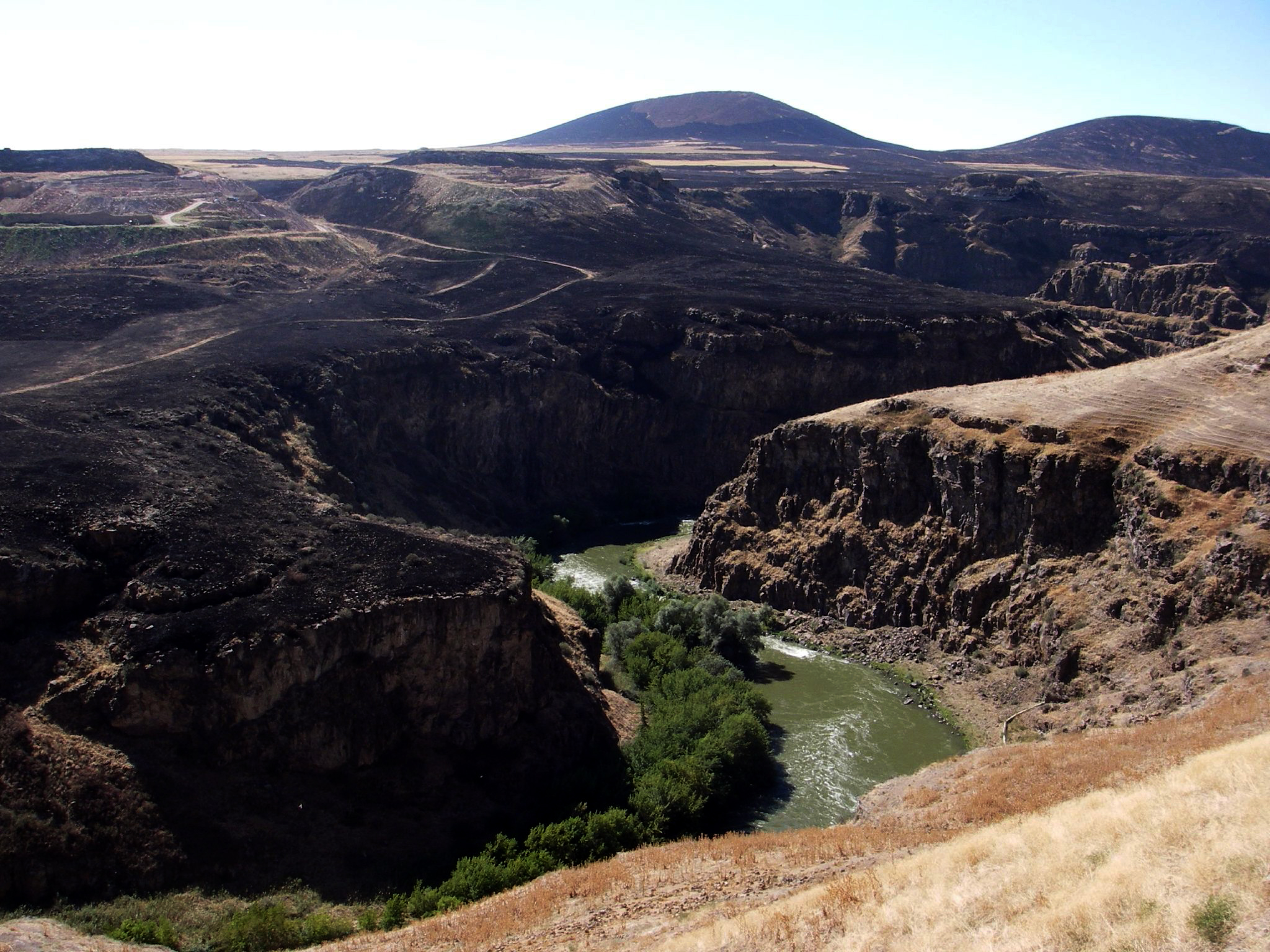
- The Akhuryan seen from the ancient Armenian capital of Ani in Turkey.

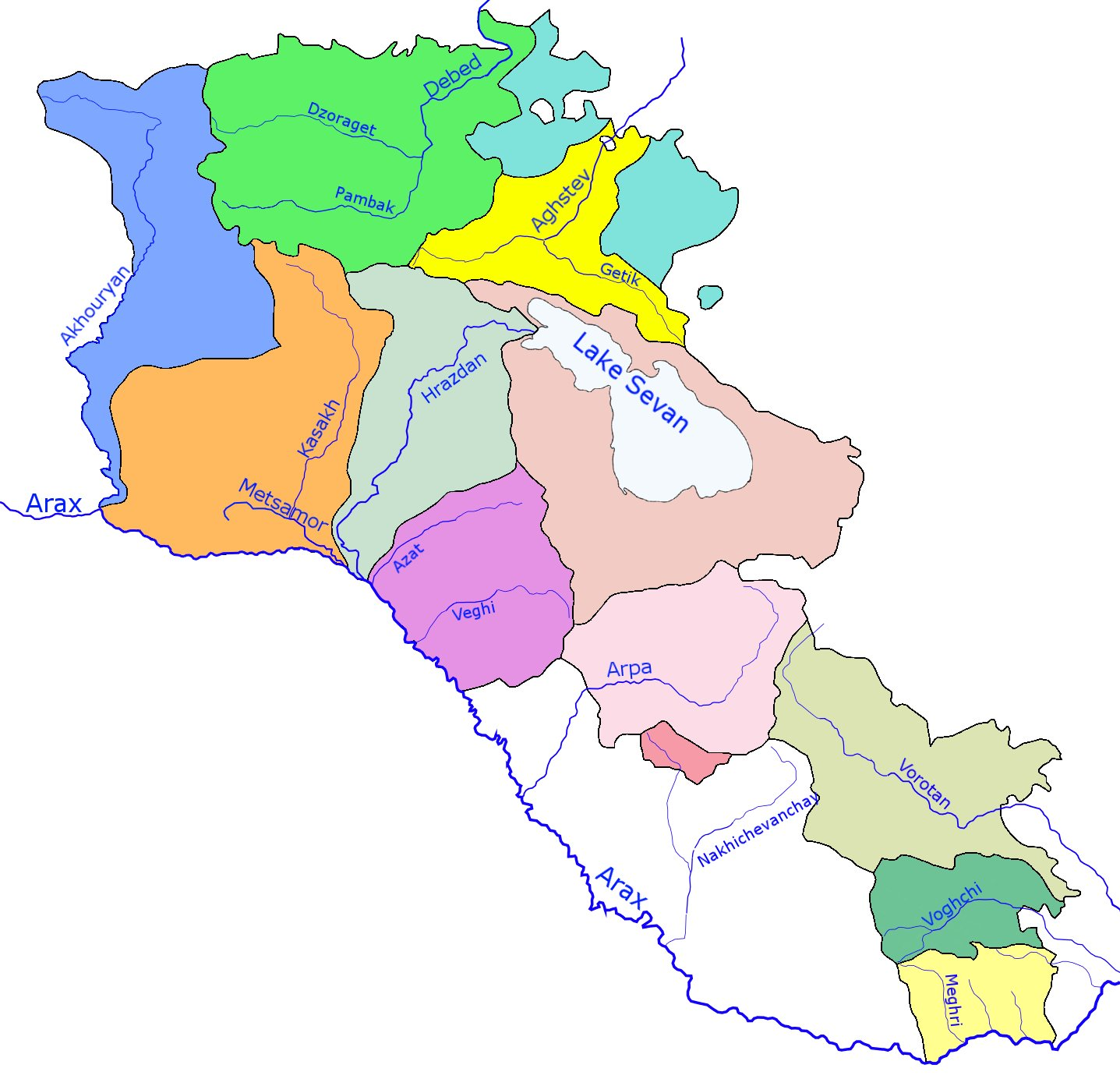
- Akhuryan river and its basin (blue) within Armenia

- Location of mouth Akhuryan (river) (Turkey)
- Native name: Ախուրյան (Armenian); Arpaçay (Turkish)

Location
- Country: Armenia and Turkey

Physical characteristics
- Source: Lake Arpi
  - location: Shirak, Armenia
  - coordinates: 41.068°N 43.654°E
  - elevation: 2,023 m (6,637 ft)
- Mouth: Aras
  - location: Near Bagaran, Armenia
  - coordinates: 40.1315°N 43.6484°E
  - elevation: 953 m (3,127 ft)
- Length: 186 km (116 mi)
- Basin size: 9,670 km^{2} (3,730 sq mi)

Basin features
- Progression: Aras→ Kura→ Caspian Sea

The Akhuryan (Armenian: Ախուրյան, romanized: Akhuryan) (Note: Old Armenian: Ախուրեան Axurean; Russian: Арпачай or Ахурян) or Arpachay (Turkish: Arpaçay) is a river in the South Caucasus. It originates in Armenia and flows from Lake Arpi, along the closed border with Turkey, forming part of the geographic border between the two states, until it flows into the Aras as a left tributary near Bagaran. The Akhuryan is 186 km (116 mi) long, and has a 9,670 km^{2} (3,730 sq mi) drainage basin.

Gyumri, the second largest city of Armenia, is located on the east bank of the river.

== History ==
Akhurian river from Marmashen monastery and Marmashen hydroelectric power station

When the Byzantine army arrived in the province of Shirak in 1041, local Armenian nobles (nakharars) assembled together against them under the command of the Pahlavuni general Vahram Pahlavouni. Vahram then selected a body of 30,000 infantry and 20,000 cavalry, forming three divisions, which fought against the Byzantines. A battle ensued in which the invaders were routed. The fighting was so ferocious that the effusion of blood flowing into the Akhurian River is said to have coloured its waters completely red. The Byzantines left 21,000 dead behind. This victory allowed Vahram along with Catholicos Petros Getadardz to crown Gagik II king of Armenia and subsequently take the fortress of Ani, which had been in the hands of Vest Sarkis.

== Bridges ==
Several medieval bridges once existed over the Akhuryan.

The bridge at Ani may date back to the Bagratuni dynasty. More likely it dates to the thirteenth century. An inscription found nearby said that building work on the approach to the bridge was done in the early fourteenth century. The bridge's single arch has fallen, leaving only tall abutments that were perhaps part of a fortified gate. Nineteenth-century travelers reported a guardhouse next to the bridge, but this has since disappeared. The bridge is now set to be rebuilt as a move to further diplomatic ties between Turkey and Armenia. This agreement was signed on May 4, 2026, by Turkish Vice President Cevdet Yılmaz and Armenian Prime Minister Nikol Pashinyan.

== See also ==
- Geography of Armenia
- Geography of Turkey
- List of rivers of Armenia
- List of lakes of Armenia
