= Yervandashat (ancient city) =

Historical capital of Armenia

- Երուանդաշատ
- Location within Armenia
- 40°07′01″N 43°39′07″E

History
- Built: c. 200 BC
- Built by: King Orontes IV of Armenia
- Abandoned: After the 7th century AD

Yervandashat (also known as Erevandashat and Marmet) was the last capital of the Kingdom of the Orontids, succeeding Armavir. It was founded by King Yervand IV the Last (220–201 BC) on the left bank of the Araxes River, at its confluence with the Akhurian River. Orontes-Yervand the Last transferred the capital from Armavir to Yervandashat in the last quarter of the 3rd century BC. Movses Khorenatsi, who provides valuable information about the location and construction of Yervandashat, explains this by noting that the Araxes River had changed its course and moved away from the Armavir hill; during winter, the tributary froze because of cold winds (although some water probably still flowed through the old channel), leaving the capital without water. Khorenatsi writes:

“When the winter became prolonged and cold northern winds blew, the tributary froze completely, and sufficient drinking water could not be found for the royal residence. Distressed by this, and seeking a more strongly fortified place, Yervand moved the royal court westward...”.

Yervand surrounded the citadel with high walls, reinforced the city gates with copper-plated and strongly fortified doors, and dug passages down to the foot of the hill so that water could be obtained from the river in the event of a siege of Yervandashat.

Yervand transferred all the royal wealth and part of the population of Armavir to the new capital. The nobles and the people were dissatisfied with the king, and fearing that it would be impossible to ensure his safety during sacrifices and pagan festivals, Yervand moved the wealth of the temples and the statues of the gods to Bagaran.

As noted by the Armenian architect and researcher Toros Toramanian, the ruins still exist to this day and astonish visitors not only because of their exceptionally strong and strategically advantageous location, but also due to the numerous residential sections within the fortress walls. According to him, this indicates that Yervand gathered a large number of his supporters and loyal followers within this extensive fortress in order to ensure his own security.

== Economy ==
“In his days the royal residence was moved from the hill called Armavir, because the Araxes River had withdrawn from it; and when winter became prolonged and cold northern winds blew, the frozen tributary could no longer provide sufficient water for the royal residence. Therefore, Yervand, troubled by this and seeking a more secure location, transferred the palace westward to a rock-cut hill, around which the Araxes flowed while the Akhurian ran opposite it. He enclosed the hill with walls and cut through the rock in many places down to the base of the hill at river level, so that water from the river could be obtained through the excavated passages for drinking purposes. He strengthened the citadel with high walls and installed copper gates in the walls; iron stairways rose within them up to the gates, and hidden traps were placed among the steps so that anyone secretly entering to plot against the king might be captured. It is said that there were two entrances: one for royal servants and all administrative activities, and another for nighttime use and protection against evildoers”.

This hill, approximately 100 meters high, was inaccessible from the river side and highly suitable for defense. By contrast, the left (northern) bank of the Araxes consists of a plain stretching from the hills toward the river and is particularly unfavorable for defense from the hill side. In this area, according to Movses Khorenatsi, stood the forest of Tsnndots planted by Yervand:

“And he planted a great cedar forest on the northern side of the river and enclosed it with walls, preventing swift goats, deer, stags, boars, and other animals from entering. As their numbers increased, they filled the forest, and the king delighted in hunting there. He named the forest Tsnndots”.

When Yervandashat ceased to be a royal capital, this forest also lost its importance, and settlements were later established there once again. Among the materials collected from this area, fragments of Hellenistic pottery are very scarce, while medieval materials predominate. This indicates that the area was not inhabited during the Hellenistic period.

From a strategic standpoint, Yervandashat occupied a highly advantageous position. The citadel stood on an inaccessible cliff opposite the confluence of the Akhurian and Araxes rivers. It was inaccessible from the north, northeast, and northwest. The citadel described by Movses Khorenatsi was fortified with high walls, and its gates had copper doors, possibly double ones. The iron stairways leading to the gates were probably movable, while hidden traps were installed on both sides of the gate (possibly the palace gate) to capture conspirators.

The city itself was probably also walled and situated on the plain of the right bank of the Araxes. It is possible that the city, protected by water barriers on three sides, was separated from the south by a canal, as Artashes did when founding Artashat. Yervandashat had ample drinking and irrigation water. The Araxes valley was highly favorable for agriculture, while the Araxes and Akhurian rivers were rich in fish. Yervandashat lay on an important trade route, which encouraged the development of commerce and crafts. Owing to its favorable location, it prospered, expanded, and survived until the 360s AD.

Part of the population that Tigranes II relocated from Hellenistic cities to Armenia also settled in Yervandashat. During the 1st century BC and the 1st century AD, the city expanded beyond its original boundaries, and new districts emerged on the lower terraces of the Tsnndots forest and on both banks of the Araxes. This is confirmed by construction techniques and archaeological evidence.

Initially, Yervandashat was a fortress and a settlement. It probably became a center of trade somewhat later. During the Arsacid period, Yervandashat was under the control of the princely house of the Kamsarakans and apparently ranked among the foremost centers of Armenia alongside Artashat and Vagharshapat.

The great commercial importance of Yervandashat is explained by the fact that, like Artashat, it was a junction point on the main route leading to Satala, Trebizond, as well as Phasis and Sebastopolis-Dioscurias.
