= Tigranes I =

- Great King
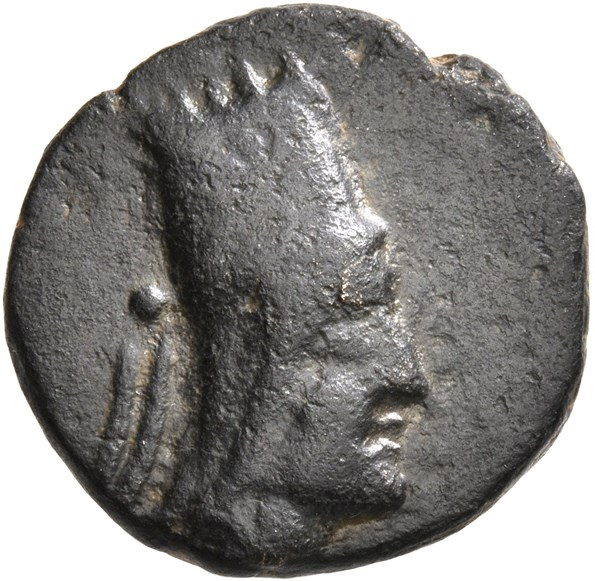
- Coin of Tigranes I

King of Armenia
- Reign: 120 – 95 BC (disputed)
- Predecessor: Artavasdes I
- Successor: Tigranes II the Great
- Died: 95 BC
- Issue: Two sons: Tigranes II; Guras
- House: Artaxiad
- Father: Artaxias I
- Mother: Satenik (?)

Tigranes I (Ancient Greek: Τιγράνης) was an Artaxiad king of Armenia at the end of the 2nd and the beginning of the 1st century BC. Few records have survived about his and his predecessor Artavasdes I's reign, which has led to some confusion. Some modern scholars have doubted that such a king reigned at all. Other historians, such as Hakob Manandian, David Marshall Lang and Rouben Paul Adalian consider him a real figure but differ or are uncertain on the exact dates of his reign. Although it has been proposed that Tigranes I reigned from 123 BC to 96 BC, this view has been criticized. Another suggestion is that Tigranes I ruled in 120 BC - 95 BC and this has been recently corroborated by historian Christian Marek.

== Name ==
The name Tigránēs (Τιγράνης) is the Greek form of Old Iranian Tigrāna (Tigran Տիգրան in Armenian). The exact etymology is disputed but it is likely an Old Iranian patronymic formation of the suffix *-āna- and the name *Tigrā- (meaning 'slender'). The Armenian historian Movses Khorenatsi mentions a Tiran, "son of Artaxias and brother of Artavasdes", who has been identified as Tigranes I.

== Background ==
Tigranes I is assumed to be the fourth oldest son of five between Artaxias I and Satenik. He ascended to the throne due to Artavasdes I not having an available heir, as well as his other brothers being kicked out of the royal estates by Artavasdes I. He was made sparapet (commander) over the western army by Artaxias I.

After the departure of Artaxias's most trusted general, Smbat Bagratuni, Tigranes's brother, Mazhan, requested King Artaxias that Artavasdes's and Tigranes's roles be stripped from the army and instead be entrusted to Zariadres. Artaxias rejected the request and Mazhan began plotting against Tigranes. However, Artavasdes and Tigranes caught wind of the plot and ambushed and killed Mazhan during a hunting trip. They then buried him at Bagaran.

== Seleucid and Iberian invasion ==
In 165/4 BC, the Seleucid army, led by Antiochus IV Epiphanes, invaded Armenia and defeated Tigranes's army, forcing him to retreat to Basen and await aid from Artavasdes I and Smbat Bagratuni. Eventually the Armenian army defeated the Seleucid army, which had to return to Syria due to internal troubles at home. Tigranes's brother, Zariadres was captured after a defeat in Javakheti, three years later Tigranes, Artavasdes, and Smbat marched towards Trialeti, but negotiate for Zariadres's freedom, as well as scoring an alliance with the Iberian kingdom while ceding Javakheti and Ardahan.

=== Parthian invasion ===
In 120 BC, the Parthian king Mithradates II invaded Armenia. Artavasdes I was forced to give Tigranes's son, the future Tigranes II the Great, to Mithradates II as a hostage and recognize Parthian suzerainty over Armenia.

Near East in 100 BC, during Tigran I's reign. Armenia is shown in green

== Reign ==
In 120 BC, after the death of Artavasdes I, Tigranes I ascended the throne. Hakob Manandian, citing Strabo, mentions that Tigranes I put up a strong resistance against the Parthians and successfully defended Armenia and faced no conflict afterwards. He also stripped the Vahevunis of their priesthood after finding out that they had moved the gold plated statue of Vahagn located in Armavir to their domain in Ashtishat after the death of Artaxias I.

Tigranes entered into a rivalry with a Bznuni prince named Datake, who boasted that he was richer than the king. Tigranes also had to deal with the inheritance issues of his and other families, as his relatives living in the region of Hashteank complained that there was not enough land to divide among themselves. Tigranes told them to move to Aghiovit or Arberan; however, they protested. Eventually Tigranes told them that they either move to Arberan or Aghiovit or split what they had among themselves. Seeing that not enough land could be split among themselves in Hashteank, some of the Artaxiads moved.

Tigranes also gave away Artavasdes's holdings to an Andzevatsi prince named Erakhnavu, who was a distinguished man and had married the last of Artavasdes's wives. He was eventually made second rank and sparapet of the eastern army. He also took care of Druasp, a Persian friend who had become related by marriage to the princes of Vaspurakan and was given the town of Tateawn and its estates, and vineyards as well as establishing his court in the town of Chrmes in the region of Ekegheats.

Tigranes married his daughter Eraneak to a man named Trdat Bagratuni, who was the son of Smbatuhi, the daughter of Smbat Bagratuni. Eraneak hated her husband, complaining about Trdat's ugly appearance. This angered Trdat and he beat Ereneak severely, dragging her outside. He then entered in rebellion to secure the regions of Media; however, upon arriving in Syunik, he received the news of Tigranes's death and ended the rebellion. Tigranes died in a snowstorm in around 95 BC.

After his death, Tigranes II, who was given as hostage to the Parthians by Artavasdes I, returned from his captivity in Parthia and assumed the throne. According to Appian, Tigranes II was the son Tigranes I. This view has also been supported by modern research.

Barring the conflict with Parthians, the reign of Tigranes I has been described as generally peaceful and devoid of major external events.

== Coinage ==
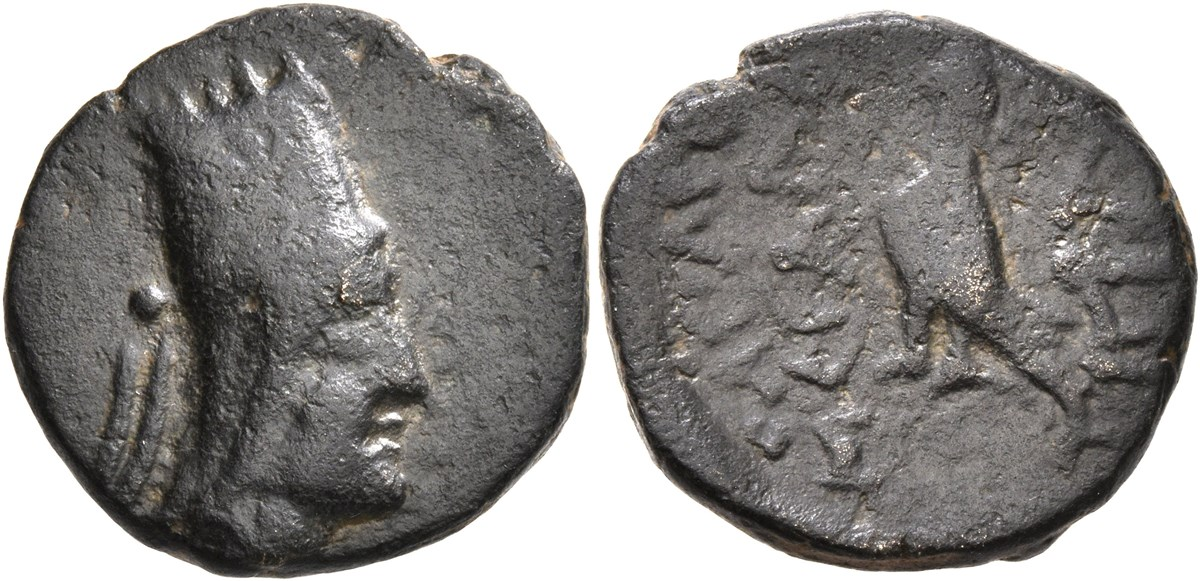
Coin minted during Tigranes I's reign, eagle on the reverse.

According to Kovacs, only three types of coins have been attributed to Tigranes I, all with the Greek inscription ΒΑΣΙΛΕΩΣ ΜΕΓΑΛΟΥ ΤΙΓΡΑΝΟΥ ('King Tigranes the Great') and depicting Tigranes I wearing a five-pointed tiara. The reverses of these coins either depicts an eagle standing, a cornucopia with a grape cluster, or a thunderbolt.

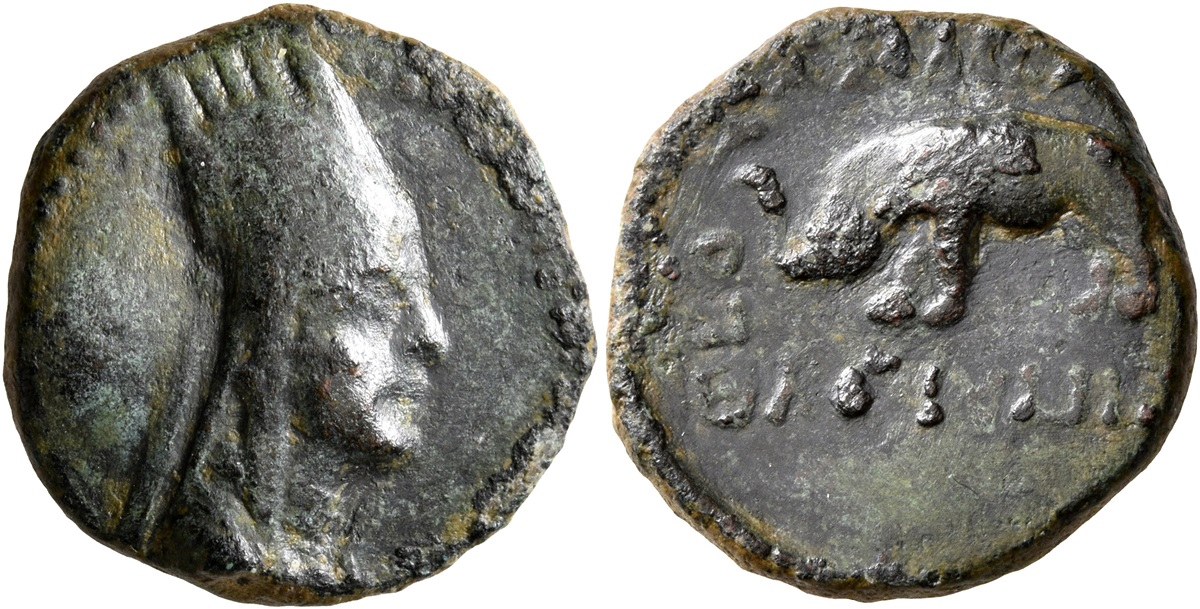
Coin of a deified Tigranes I, minted during Tigranes II's reign. Elephant on the reverse. The word ΘΕΟΥ ('divine') is visible.

Following the death of Tigranes I, his son Tigranes II proclaimed him as a god and minted coins with his image and the inscription ΒΑΣΙΛΕΩΣ ΜΕΓΑΛΟΥ ΤΙΓΡΑΝΟΥ ΘΕΟΥ ('King Tigranes the Great and Divine'). Six of these coins were issued, three of which being minted in Artaxata and the other three minted in Tigranocerta. The reverses of these coins either depict an elephant, horse, lion, or the goddess Nike holding a wreath or palm.

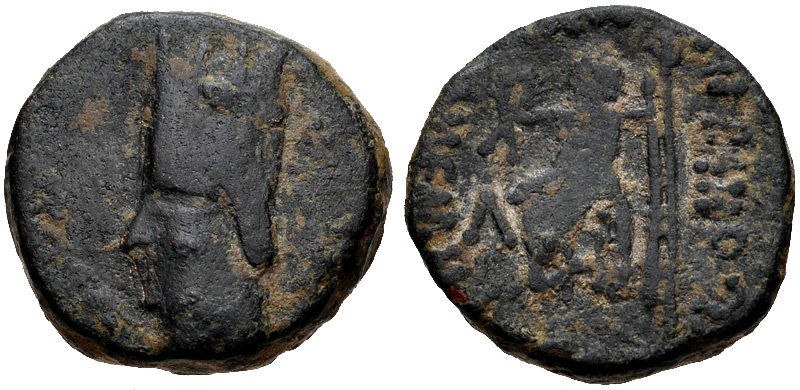
Coin of Tigranes II, commonly misattributed to Tigranes I.

Some numismatists such as Bedoukian and Nupertlian have argued that the coins depicting a crude bust of a beardless king facing left is attributed to Tigranes I. However, Kovacs attributes them to Tigranes II, citing the regnal year visible on the reverse. They were also minted in Nisibis, which was not under Armenian control during the time of Tigranes I.

== Family ==
Tigranes I had four brothers: his predecessor Artavasdes I, Zariadres, Vruyr and Mazhan. Although Alan princess Satenik has been shown to be Artaxias I's wife, there is no concrete evidence that she was their mother.

Tigranes I had two sons and a daughter, his successor Tigranes II (r. 95–55 BC) and Guras, who is mentioned by Plutarch as the governor of Nisibis, and Eraneak, who was married off to Trdat Bagratuni. Guras was later captured by Roman general Lucullus. Judging by Roman author Lucian's Macrobii, Tigranes II was born to Tigranes I in c. 140 BC.

== Bibliography ==
- (in English)
- Adalian, Rouben Paul (2010). Historical Dictionary of Armenia. Lanham, MD: Scarecrow Press. pp. 1–750. ISBN 9780810874503.
- Bedoukian, Paul Z. (1978). Coinage of the Artaxiads of Armenia. London: Royal Numismatic Society. pp. 1–81. ISBN 9781886720039.
- Bedoukian, Paul Z. (1968). "A Classification of the Coins of the Artaxiad Dynasty of Armenia". Museum Notes (American Numismatic Society). 14. American Numismatic Society: 41–66.
- de Morgan, Jacques (1965). The History of the Armenian People. Hairenik Press.
- Foss, Clive (1986). "The Coinage of Tigranes the Great: Problems, Suggestions and a New Find". The Numismatic Chronicle. 146. Royal Numismatic Society: 19–66. ISSN 0078-2696.
- Kurkjian, Vahan (1958). "XIII: Tigran the Great". A history of Armenia. Armenian General Benevolent Union. pp. 74–84.
- Garsoïan, Nina (1997). "The Emergence of Armenia". In Hovannisian, Richard G. (ed.). The Armenian people from ancient to modern times. Vol. 1. New York: St. Martin's Press. pp. 37–60. ISBN 978-0-312-10169-5.
- Lang, David M. (1980). Armenia: Cradle of Civilization. Allen & Unwin. pp. 1–320. ISBN 978-0049560093.
- Manandian, Hakob (2007). Tigranes II and Rome: a new interpretation based on primary sources. Mazda Publishers. pp. 1–201. ISBN 978-1568591667.
- Marek, Christian (2016). In the Land of a Thousand Gods: A History of Asia Minor in the Ancient World. Princeton University Press. ISBN 978-0691159799.
- Nercessian, Y. T. (1991). "An Unpublished Coin of Tigranes I" (PDF). Patma-Banasirakan Handes. XVII. Armenian Numismatic Society: 12–21. ISSN 0135-0536.
- Nercessian, Y. T. (1995). Armenian coins and their values. Armenian Numismatic Society. pp. 1–254. ISBN 9780960684281.
- Redgate, Anne Elizabeth (2000). The Armenians. Wiley–Blackwell. ISBN 9780631143727.
- Schmitt, Rüdiger (2005). "Personal Names, Iranian iv. Parthian Period". Encyclopaedia Iranica.
- Sullivan, R. D. (1973). "Diadochic Coinage in Commagene After Tigranes the Great". The Numismatic Chronicle. 13. Royal Numismatic Society: 18–39. ISSN 0078-2696.
- Tavernier, Jan (2007). Iranica in the Achaemenid Period (ca. 550-330 B.C.): Lexicon of Old Iranian Proper Names and Loanwords, Attested in Non-Iranian Texts. Peeters Publishers. pp. 1–201. ISBN 978-9042918337.
- (in Armenian)
- Acharian, Hrachia (1942). Հայոց անձնանունների բառարան (Dictionary of Armenian Proper Names) (in Armenian). Yerevan: Yerevan State University.
- Aghayan, Eduard, ed. (1971). "5: Հայաստանը հելլենիստական ժամանակաշրջանում։ Ստրկատիրական հասարակարգի զարգացումը". Հայ Ժողովրդի Պատմություն (History of Armenian people) (in Armenian). Vol. 1. Yerevan: ՀՍՍՀ ԳԱ հրատ. pp. 498–712.
- Manandian, Hakob (1945). "9: Արտաշեսյան և Զարեհյան թագավորությունների հաստատումը Հայաստանում". Քննական Տեսություն Հայ Ժողովրդի Պատմության (Critical Survey of the History of the Armenian People) (in Armenian). Vol. 1. Yerevan: Հայպետհրատ. pp. 114–138.
- Margaryan, Hasmik Z. (2018). "Արտաշես Ա արքայի Արտամատ քաղաքը՝ ըստ Թովմա Արծրունու "Արծրունյաց տան պատմության" (The City of Artashes I Artamat, according to "The History of the House of Artsruni" by Tovma Artsruni)". Lraber Hasarakakan Gitutyunneri (in Armenian). 1. Yerevan: Armenian National Academy of Sciences: 285–300. ISSN 0320-8117.
- Nahapetyan, Rafik A. (2017). "Ապպիանոսի "Հռոմեական պատմություն" երկը՝ հայոց պատմության և մշակույթի կարևոր սկզբնաղբյուր (Appian's Work Roman History as an Important Source for the Armenian History and Culture)". Lraber Hasarakakan Gitutyunneri (in Armenian). 2. Yerevan: Armenian National Academy of Sciences: 70–80. ISSN 0320-8117.
- (in Russian)
- Sargsyan, Gagik (1991). "Свидетельство поздневавилонской клинописной хроники об Армении времени Тиграна II (An Evidence About Armenia of Tigran II' s Period in the Late-Babylonian Cuneiform Chronicle)". Patma-Banasirakan Handes. Istoriko-Filologicheskii Zhurnal (in Russian). 2. Patma-Banasirakan Handes: 45–54. ISSN 0135-0536.
- (in German)
- Schottky, Martin (1989). Media Atropatene und Gross-Armenien in hellenistischer Zeit (in German). Bonn: Habelt. ISBN 9783774923942.

Tigranes I Artaxiad dynasty
| Preceded by Artavasdes I | King of Armenia; 120 BC – 95 BC | Succeeded by Tigranes II |
