= Battle of Artaxata =

68 BC battle between Romans and Armenians

- Part of the Third Mithridatic War
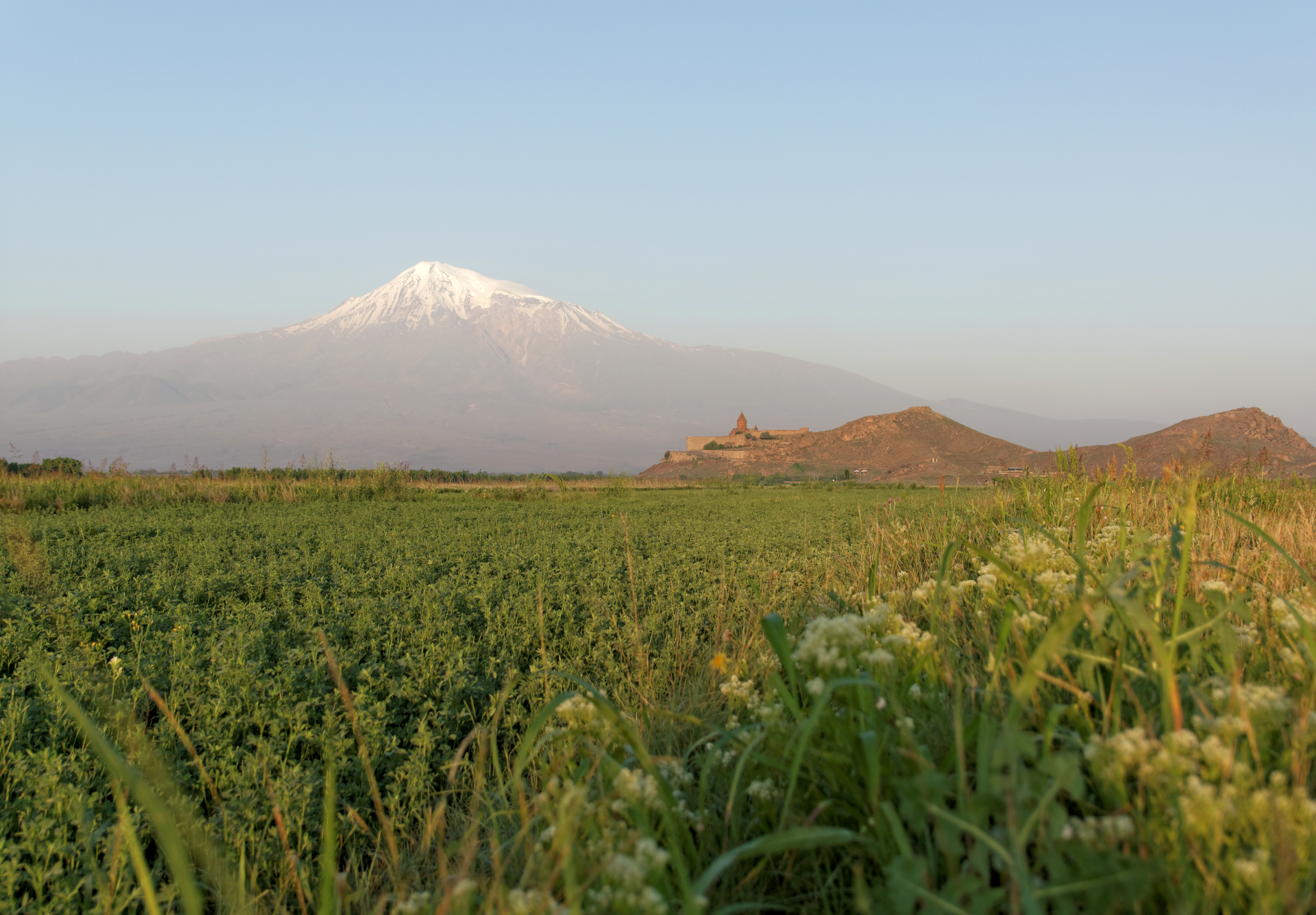
- View of Khor Virap Monastery. The hill where the monastery was built is the location of now ruined Artaxata
Date	68 BC
Location	near Artaxata, Armenia 39°53′06″N 44°34′34″E
Result	Roman victory

Belligerents
Roman Republic	(Artaxiad dynasty) Kingdom of Armenia; Kingdom of Pontus

Commanders and leaders
Lucius Licinius Lucullus	(Artaxiad dynasty) Tigranes II; Mithridates VI of Pontus

Strength
15,000+ infantry 1,500+ cavalry an unknown number of allies	Unknown but a significant number of cavalry and infantry

Casualties and losses
Unknown	Unknown but higher
- Location within Armenia Battle of Artaxata (Caucasus Mountains)

The Battle of Artaxata was fought near the Arsanias River in 68 BC between an army of the Roman Republic and the army of the Kingdom of Armenia. The Romans were led by proconsul Lucius Licinius Lucullus, while the Armenians were led by Tigranes II of Armenia, who was sheltering Mithridates VI of Pontus, his father-in-law and refugee King of Pontus. The battle was part of the Third Mithridatic War and ended in a Roman victory.

== Background ==
After being defeated by the Romans in Asia Minor and in his native kingdom of Pontus, Mithridates VI of Pontus fled to his son-in-law Tigranes II of Armenia. Lucullus sent his brother-in-law Appius Claudius Pulcher to negotiate the surrender of Mithridates but this effort failed. In 69 BC Lucullus suddenly marched his relatively small army into Armenia catching the Armenian king off guard. Tigranes assembled a large (but untrained) army and the two forces met at Tigranocerta, the kingdom's new capital, with Lucullus decisively winning the ensuing battle. Tigranes and Mithridates fled north to Armenia's old capital of Artaxata, where they recruited, trained and equipped a new army. The next year, Lucullus marched his army north intend on forcing his enemies into a decisive battle.

== Prelude ==
The Romans were marching towards Artaxata, the Kingdom's old capital, to force Tigranes into fighting a pitched battle. Tigranes, on Mithridates' advice, had been avoiding a battle after being defeated at Tigranocerta. He knew his untrained army was no match for the disciplined and battle-hardened Roman troops. Since the Romans' objective [Artaxata] was clear to them, Tigranes and Mithridates had been preparing and training their army for the unavoidable battle but needed time. Lucullus was not inclined to grant them the time needed and marched straight for the capital. Eventually Tigranes had little choice and confronted the Romans. Lucullus made sacrifices to the gods, marched out from his camp and put his army into battle order.

== Battle ==
The Armenian force consisted of a significant cavalry and infantry array protected by mounted archers and Iberian lancers. There was an initial skirmish between these Iberians and the Roman horse, and soon the Iberians were in full flight. Mithridates then showed up with a huge contingent of cavalry. Lucullus halted his cavalry's pursuit of the Iberians and advanced the infantry on the Atropani who were massed opposite it. These were routed, and soon the entire Armenian army was in retreat.

== Aftermath ==
Soon after the battle, there was a near mutiny in Lucullus' camp. His troops were worn out after marching for 960 miles (1,500 km) and fighting many battles with little to show for it. They refused to march after Tigranes and Mithridates and forced Lucullus to turn south and invade the Armenian possessions in Mesopotamia. Mithridates and Tigranes turned to guerrilla warfare and soon, Armenia was back in Tigranes' hands. Mithridates returned to Pontus where he was able to regain power after the Battle of Zela . Eventually, the Roman Senate sent Pompey the great to replace Lucullus and finish off Mithridates. Pompey was successful, and Mithridates was defeated at the Battle of Lycus in 66 BC, while Tigranes became a client-king of the Roman Empire. In 63 BC, the third Mithridatic war finally ended when Mithridates, at the age of 68, committed suicide after his son rebelled at Phanagoria, along the eastern shore of the Cimmerian Bosporus.

== See also ==
- Battle of Tigranocerta
- Siege of Artaxata
- Treaty of Artaxata

== Sources ==
- An Encyclopedia of Battles: Accounts of Over 1560 Battles from 1479 B.C. to the Present By David Eggenberger - Page 30
- Plutarch, Vita Luculli XXXI 4-8(Life of Lucullus, 31.4-8).
- Frantantuono, Lee (2017). Lucullus, The Life and Campaigns of a Roman conqueror. Pen and Sword Military. ISBN 978-1473883611.
- Matyszak, Philip (2016). Mithridates the Great, Rome's Indomitable Enemy. Pen and Sword Military. ISBN 978-1473828902.
- Patterson, Lee E. (2015). "Antony and Armenia". TAPA. 145 (1 (Spring)). The Johns Hopkins University Press: 77–105.
- Sherwin-White, A. N. (1994). "Lucullus, Pompey and the East 8a - Lucullus, Pompey and the East". In Crook, John; Lintott, Andrew; Rawson, Elizabeth (eds.). The Cambridge Ancient History, Volume 9: The Last Age of the Roman Republic, 146–43 BC. Vol. 9. Cambridge University Press. pp. 229–273. ISBN 978-0521256032.
- Steel, Catherine (2013). The End of the Roman Republic 146 to 44 BC: Conquest and Crisis. Edinburgh University Press.
- Wylie, Graham J. (1994). "Lucullus Daemoniac". L'Antiquité Classique. 63: 117. "Foiled in this, Lucullus now decided on a midsummer (68 B.C.) offensive deep into Armenia, to crush his «exhausted antagonists»Mithridates and Tigranes who, anticipating such a move, had assembled another large army with a powerful cavalry force to harass his foragers. He brought them to battle north of Lake Van, somewhere on the upper Arsanias, an eastern tributary of the Euphrates, and put their army to flight (PLUT., Luc., 31, 5). Tigranes at once retreated to his capital, Artaxata."
