= Siege of Artaxata =

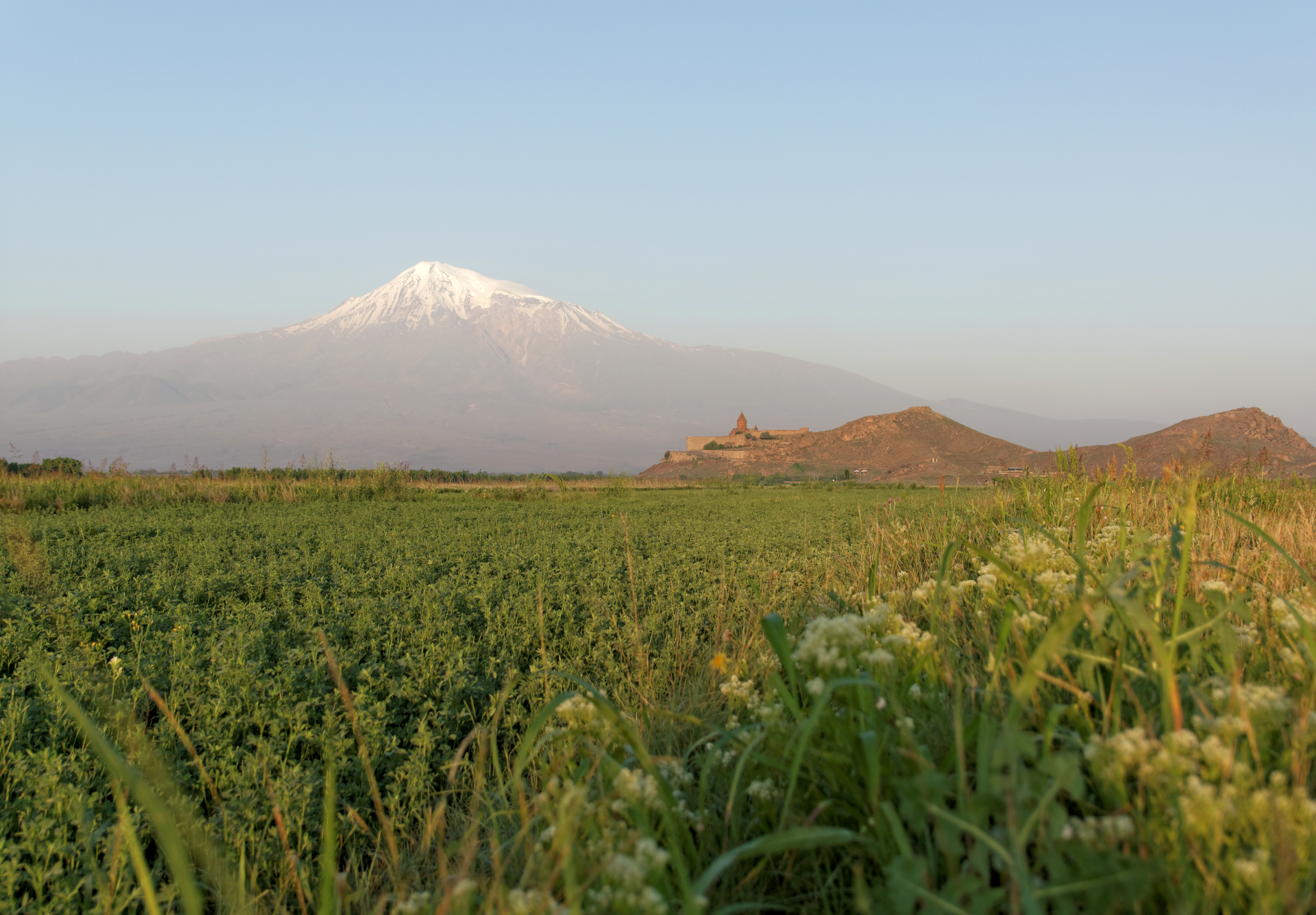
- View of Khor Virap Monastery. The hill where the monastery was built is the location of now ruined Artaxata
| Date | 66 BC |
| Location | Artashat, Armenia |
| Result | Artaxiad victory |

Belligerents
| Artaxiad dynasty | Parthian Empire |

Commanders and leaders
| Tigranes the Great | Tigranes the Younger; Phraates III |

Strength
| Unknown | Unknown |

The siege of Artaxata occurred in 66 BC near present-day Artashat (ancient Artaxata), situated along the Araxes River close to modern Yerevan. This military engagement saw forces led by Tigranes the Younger and Phraates III of Parthia attempt to overthrow the ruling Artaxiad dynasty under Tigranes the Great.

== Siege ==
In 66 BC, Tigranes the Younger, son of Tigranes the Great, initiated a rebellion against his father. After facing defeat, he allied with Phraates III of Parthia to launch a joint invasion of Armenia. While their campaign initially made progress, the coalition forces became bogged down during the prolonged siege of Artaxata. Growing impatient, Phraates III withdrew the bulk of his troops, leaving Tigranes the Younger in command of a reduced Parthian contingent.

Tigranes the Great successfully repelled his son's weakened forces, prompting Tigranes the Younger to seek asylum with Roman general Pompey. This compelled Tigranes the Great to negotiate a settlement with Pompey. When Phraates III seized the strategic region of Gordyene in 65 BC, Pompey intervened to restore it to Tigranes the Great, further cementing Roman influence in the region.

== See also ==
- Battle of Tigranocerta
- Battle of Artaxata
