= Parthian War =

The Parthian War may refer to:

- The Seleucid–Parthian Wars (238–129 BC)
- The Armenian–Parthian War (87–85 BC)
- The Roman–Parthian Wars, including:
  - Antony's Atropatene campaign or the Roman–Parthian War (40–33 BC)
  - The Roman–Parthian War of 58–63
  - Trajan's Parthian campaign (114–117)
  - The Roman–Parthian War of 161–166 or the Parthian War of Lucius Verus
  - The Parthian war of Caracalla (216–217)

== See also ==
- Roman–Persian Wars
