= Military campaigns of Tigranes the Great =

Ancient war

Tigranes Armenian Empire

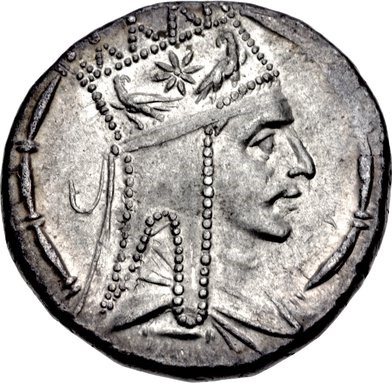
Tigranes the Great

The military campaigns of Tigranes the Great, the king of Greater Armenia from 95 to 55 BCE, consisted of offensives against client kingdoms of the Roman Republic and Parthian Empire. His conquests extended the realm from the Caspian Sea in the east to the Mediterranean Sea in the west, encompassing territories such as Syria, Phoenicia, and parts of Anatolia (modern-day Turkey). He built a new capital, Tigranocerta, and populated it with people deported from Cappadocia. His initial invasions of Cappadocia drew the attention of the Roman Republic, and after being defeated in two separate campaigns, Tigranes was allowed to keep Armenia as a client kingdom of Rome while paying an indemnity of 6,000 talents and relinquishing all his conquests.

== Background ==
In 120 BCE, Tigranes was taken as hostage, following his uncle Artavasdes' defeat by Mithradates II, king of Parthia. By 95 BCE, Tigranes had inherited the kingdom of Armenia from his father and secured his freedom by surrendering seventy valleys to the Parthians. In 91 BCE, Mithradates II, king of Parthia, died and Gotarzes I, his son, took over as ruler. During his reign, the Parthian Empire was divided by civil war, while Rome was preoccupied with the Social war, to which Tigranes expanded his territory by the conquering and annexing former client-kingdoms.

== Campaigns ==
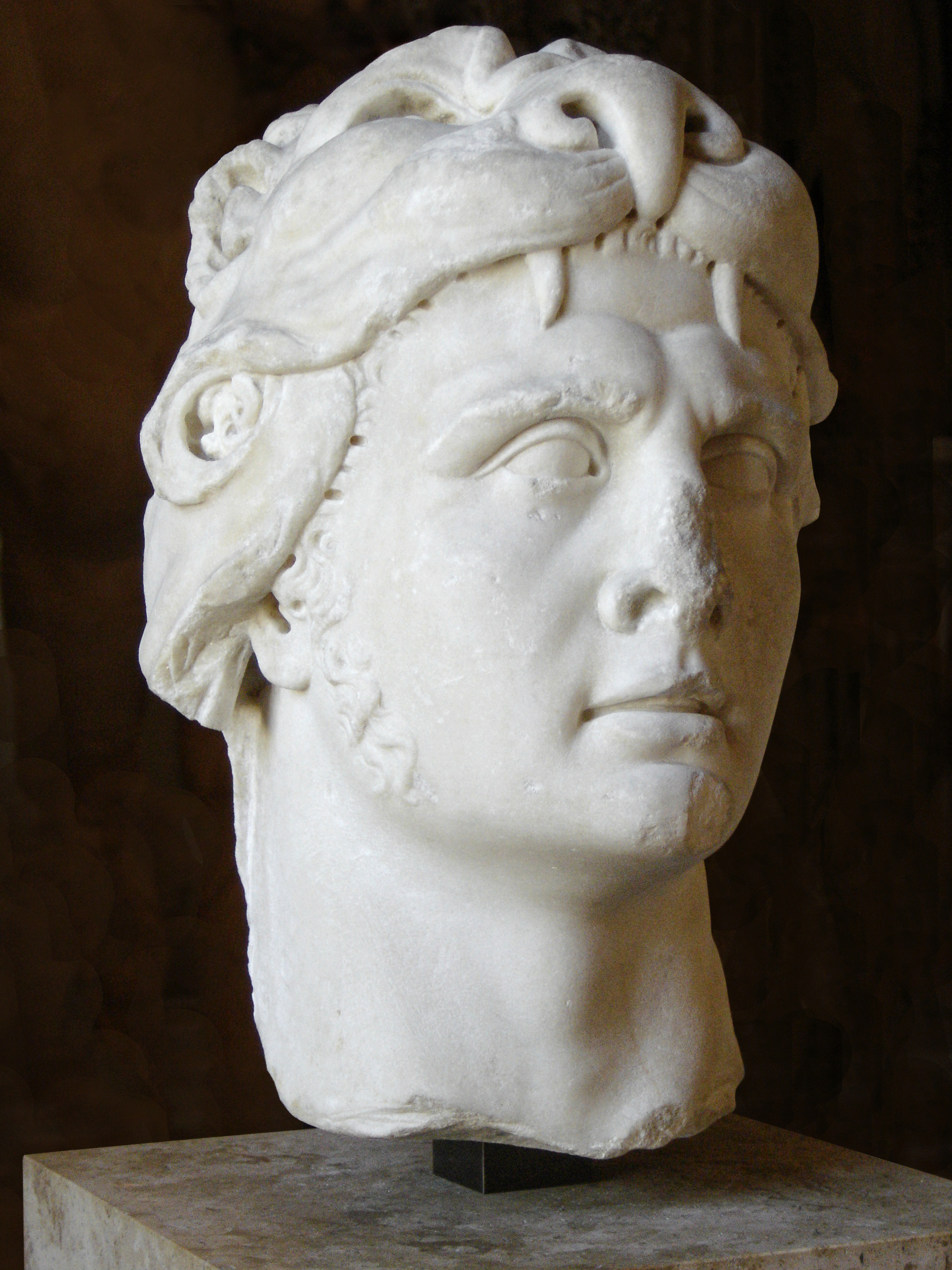
Mithridates VI of Pontus, Tigranes father-in-law

=== Campaign of 95 BCE ===
Tigranes invaded Sophene around 95 BCE. He either deposed the king of Sophene, Artanes, and fully annexed the territory, or left Artanes as a client-king. (Note: Marciak, like Wheeler and Bedoukian, concludes that Tigranes deposed Artanes, while Sullivan and Olbrycht believe that Artanes was kept as a client-king.)

=== Campaign of 91–90 BCE ===
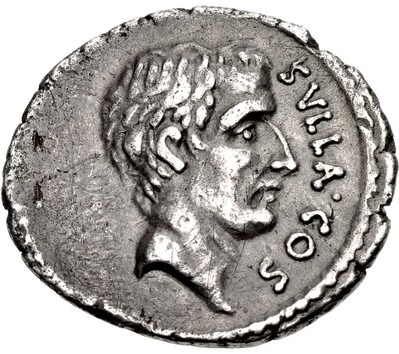
Pro-consul Lucius Cornelius Sulla Felix

In 91-90 BCE, (Note: Marciak and Overtoom indicate that Tigranes invaded Cappadocia sometime after invading Sophene c. 95/94 BCE, while Overtoom states that a second invasion of Cappadocia by Tigranes occurred in 92 BCE.) (Note: Sullivan states Tigranes attacked Cappadocia five times and used part of its population to furnish his capital Tigranocerta.) Tigranes was persuaded by his father-in-law, Mithridates VI Eupator, to attack the Roman client kingdom of Cappadocia. Ariobarzanes, king of Cappadocia, fled to Rome ahead of Tigranes' army, while a treaty between Mithridates and Tigran gave Cappadocian cities and lands to the former and its population and movable property(spoils) to the latter. In response, Roman general Sulla occupied Cappadocia, forced out and killed many Armenians and disloyal Cappadocians, and re-installed Ariobarzanes as client-king of Cappadocia. Despite Sulla's invasion, Tigranes was able to unite the eastern province of Cappadocia, Melitene, with Sophene.

=== Campaign of 88–85 BCE ===
From 88 to 85 BCE, Tigranes retook the seventy valleys, (Note: Manandian, quoting Markwart, indicates that these valleys were located in Atropatene and originally conquered by Artaxias I.) given to the Parthian Empire for his freedom, located in Atropatene. He invaded and occupied Adiabene, Gordyene, and Media-Atropatene, and according Nina Garsoïan his forces advanced as far as Ecbatana. (Note: Numismatic evidence indicates that Gotarzes continued to mint coins at Ecbatana during his reign.) According to Manandian, Tigranes did, however, burn Adrapana, a fort 10 kilometers from Ecbatana.

=== Campaign of 84–83 BCE ===
In 84-83 BCE, Tigranes annexed Cilicia Pedias, Mygdonia, Osroene, (Note: Christoph Baumer indicates that Mygdonia, Commagene, Osroene, Cilicia, south-western Syria and Phoenicia were conquered around 83 BCE.) and Commagene. Mithridates I Callinicus, king of Commagene, would continue to rule, although as a vassal. Mithridates' son, Antiochus I, would inherit Commagene from his father and continue as a client-king until the Roman offensive of 69 bce. Tigrane oversaw the resettlement of Arabs from southern Mesopotamia into Osroene, Edessa specifically.

In Syria, the constant civil war between the Seleucids, and recent death of its ruler in 84 BCE, had prompted an appeal for Tigranes to accept the throne. The conquest of Syria by Tigranes was bloodless, and Aleppo maintained its independence as a city-state. One of Tigran's generals, Magadates, was appointed governor of the newly constituted province of Syria that most likely included Cilicia. The king's brother Guras was put in charge of the significant Mesopotamian city of Nisibis.

According to some primary sources, Tigranes campaign advanced as far as Egypt, (Note: Garsoian cites Appian (Syr. 11.8.48)) while secondary sources indicate that his armies only reached northern Palestine.

=== Campaign of 78 BCE ===
Acting on the news of Sulla's death, Tigranes invaded Cappadocia, again, this time deporting 300,000 of its people to his capital Tigranocerta. This raised the population of Tigranocerta to 500,000 people.

== Aftermath ==
Tigranes' empire stretched from the Caspian Sea to the Mediterranean Sea, yet his conquests were short-lived. After the Romans had defeated his father-in-law, Mithridates VI Eupator in 70 BCE, Tigranes would be defeated in two separate campaigns. This freed the kingdoms of Iberia, Albania and Media Atropatene from Armenian hegemony, while Adiabene and Mesopotamia were returned to their local rulers. In 66 BCE, the Roman general Pompey allowed Tigranes to become a client-king of Rome and keep Armenia, after paying a war indemnity of 6,000 talents and relinquishing all provinces and kingdoms taken in his previous campaigns.

== Sources ==
- Assar, Gholamreza F. (2006). "A Revised Parthian Chronology of the Period 91–55 BC". Parthica. Instituti Editoriali e Poligrafici Internazionali: 55–104.
- Baumer, Christoph (2021). History of the Caucasus. Vol. 1: At the Crossroads of Empires. I.B. Tauris. ISBN 978-1788310079.
- Burns, Ross (2018). Aleppo: A History. Taylor & Francis. ISBN 978-0815367987.
- Facella, Margherita (2022). "Commagene". In Kaizer, Ted (ed.). A Companion to the Hellenistic and Roman Near East. John Wiley & Sons. pp. 223–239. ISBN 978-1444339826.
- Garsoian, Nina (2005). "Tigran II". Encyclopaedia Iranica.
- Hind, John G.F. (1994). "Mithridates". In Crook, J.A.; Lintott, Andrew; Rawson, Elizabeth (eds.). The Cambridge Ancient History. Vol. IX: The Last Age of the Roman Republic, 146-43 B.C. Cambridge University Press. pp. 129–164. ISBN 978-0521256032.
- Keaveney, Arthur (2005). Sulla: The Last Republican. Routledge. ISBN 978-0415336611.
- Lang, David Marshall (1970). Armenia: Cradle of Civilization. George Allen and Unwin Ltd. ISBN 978-0049560086.
- Manandian, Hakob (2007). Tigranes II and Rome: A New Interpretation Based on Primary Sources. Translated by Bournoutian, George. Mazda Publishers. ISBN 978-1568591667.
- Marciak, Michal (2017). Sophene, Gordyene, and Adiabene Three Regna Minora of Northern Mesopotamia Between East and West. Brill. ISBN 978-9004350700.
- Mommsen, Theodor (2010). The History of Rome. Vol. 4, Part 1. Cambridge University Press. ISBN 978-1148100272.
- Overtoom, Nikolaus Leo (2020). Reign of Arrows: The Rise of the Parthian Empire in the Hellenistic Middle East. Oxford University Press. ISBN 978-0190888329.
- Patterson, Lee E. (2015). "Antony and Armenia". Transactions of the American Philological Association. 145 (1 (Spring)). The Johns Hopkins University Press: 77–105.
- Sherwin-White, A.N. (1994). "Lucullus, Pompey and the East". In Crook, J.A.; Lintott, Andrew; Rawson, Elizabeth (eds.). The Cambridge Ancient History. Vol. IX: The Last Age of the Roman Republic, 146-43 B.C. Cambridge University Press. pp. 229–273. ISBN 978-0521256032.
- Sinclair, T.A. (1987). Eastern Turkey: An Architectural & Archaeological Survey. Vol. I. Pindar Press. ISBN 978-0907132325.
- Sullivan, Richard D. (1990). Near Eastern Royalty and Rome, 100-30 BC. University of Toronto Press. ISBN 978-0802026828.
- van Wijlick, Hendrikus A.M. (2020). Rome and the Near Eastern Kingdoms and Principalities, 44-31 BC: A Study of Political Relations during Civil War. Brill. ISBN 978-9004441743.
