= Tigranes the Great =

King of Armenia from 95 to 55 BC

- King of Kings; Great King; King of Armenia; King of Syria
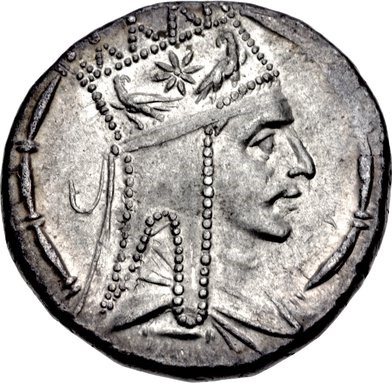
- Coin of Tigranes, Antioch mint.

King of Armenia
- Reign: 95–55 BC
- Predecessor: Tigranes I
- Successor: Artavasdes II
- Born: 140 BC
- Died: 55 BC (aged 84/85)
- Burial: Tigranocerta
- Consort: Cleopatra of Pontus
- Issue: Zariadres; Tigranes; Artavasdes II; Unnamed son Ariazate; Two unnamed daughters
- Dynasty: Artaxiad
- Father: Artavasdes I or Tigranes I
- Religion: Zoroastrianism

Tigranes II, more commonly known as Tigranes the Great (Tigran Mets in Armenian; (Note: Armenian: Տիգրան, Tigran, attested in written Armenian sources since the 5th century AD. Western Armenian pronunciation: Dikran Medz.) (Note: Ancient Greek: Τιγράνης ὁ Μέγας, Tigránes ho Mégas; Latin: Tigranes Magnus) 140–55 BC), was a king of Armenia. A member of the Artaxiad dynasty, he ruled from 95 BC to 55 BC. Under his reign, the Armenian kingdom expanded beyond its traditional boundaries and reached its peak, allowing Tigranes to claim the title Great King or King of Kings. His empire for a short time was the most powerful state to the east of the Roman Republic.

Either the son or nephew of Artavasdes I, Tigranes was given as a hostage to Mithridates II of Parthia after Armenia came under Parthian suzerainty. However, ancient authors say nothing about the suzerainty of the Parthians over Armenia. After ascending to the Armenian throne, he rapidly expanded his kingdom by invading or annexing Roman and Parthian client-kingdoms. Tigran decided to ally with Mithridates VI of Pontus by marrying his daughter Cleopatra. At its height, Tigranes' empire stretched from the Pontic Alps to Mesopotamia and from the Caspian Sea to the Mediterranean. With captured vassals, his lands even reached the Red Sea and the Persian Gulf. Many of the inhabitants of conquered cities were forcibly relocated to his new capital, Tigranocerta. An admirer of the Greek culture, Tigranes invited many Greek rhetoricians and philosophers to his court, and his capital was noted for its Hellenistic architecture.

Armenia came into direct conflict with Rome after Mithridates VI was forced to seek refuge in Tigranes' court. In 69 BC, Tigranes was decisively defeated at the Battle of Tigranocerta by a Roman army under the command of Lucullus, and a year later he met another major defeat at Artaxata, the old Armenian capital. The recall of Lucullus gave Tigranes a brief respite, but in 66 BC Armenia faced another Roman invasion led by Pompey, aided by Tigranes' own son, Tigranes the Younger. Tigranes chose to surrender and was allowed to retain the heartland of his kingdom as a Roman buffer state, while all of his conquests were annexed. He continued to rule Armenia as a client-king of Rome until his death around 55 BC at the age of 85.

== Early life ==
Around 120 BC, the Parthian king Mithridates II (r. 124–91 BC) invaded Armenia and made its king Artavasdes I acknowledge Parthian suzerainty.. However, ancient authors say nothing about the suzerainty of the Parthians over Armenia. Artavasdes I was forced to give the Parthians Tigranes, who was either his son or nephew, as a hostage. Tigranes lived in the Parthian court at Ctesiphon, where he was schooled in Parthian culture and language. Tigranes remained a hostage at the Parthian court until c. 96/95 BC, when Mithridates II released him and appointed him as the king of Armenia. Babylonian astronomical diaries for 95 BC mention "Tigranu, crown prince of Armenia", providing contemporary cuneiform evidence for him at the start of his reign. Tigranes ceded an area called "seventy valleys" in the Caspiane to Mithridates II, either as a pledge or because Mithridates II demanded it. Tigranes' daughter Ariazate had also married a son of Mithridates II, which has been suggested by the modern historian Edward Dąbrowa to have taken place shortly before he ascended the Armenian throne as a guarantee of his loyalty. Tigranes would remain a Parthian vassal until the late 80s BC.

When he came to power, the foundation upon which Tigranes was to build his Empire was already in place, a legacy of the founder of the Artaxiad dynasty, Artaxias I, and subsequent kings. The mountains of Armenia, however, formed natural borders between the different regions of the country and as a result, the feudalistic nakharars had significant influence over the regions or provinces in which they were based. This did not suit Tigranes, who wanted to create a centralized empire. He thus proceeded by consolidating his power within Armenia before embarking on his campaign.

In assessing the reign of Tigranes, Soviet Armenian historiography drew upon historical materialism. Tigranes' foreign policies, often characterized as "expansionist," were interpreted as being motivated by economic factors — specifically, the acquisition and exploitation of new territories to satisfy the material needs of the ruling class. According to Hakob Manandian, this referred to the "landowning nobility," while Gagik Sargsyan identified it as the enrichment of "slave‑owners", and thus the perceived necessity for territorial expansion.

He deposed Artanes, the last king of the Kingdom of Sophene and a descendant of Zariadres.

== Alliance with Pontus ==
During the First Mithridatic War (89–85 BC), Tigranes supported Mithridates VI of Pontus, but was careful not to become directly involved in the war.

He rapidly built up his power and established an alliance with Mithridates VI, marrying his daughter Cleopatra. Tigranes agreed to extend his influence in the East, while Mithridates set to conquer Roman land in Asia Minor and in Europe. By creating a stronger Hellenistic state, Mithridates was to contend with the well-established Roman foothold in Europe. Mithridates executed a planned general attack on Romans and Italians in Asia Minor, tapping into local discontent with the Romans and their taxes and urging the peoples of Asia Minor to raise against foreign influence. The slaughter of 80,000 people in the province of Asia Minor was known as the Asiatic Vespers. The two kings' attempts to control Cappadocia and then the massacres resulted in guaranteed Roman intervention. The senate decided that Lucius Cornelius Sulla, who was then one of the consuls, would command the army against Mithridates.

René Grousset remarked that in their alliance Mithridates was somewhat subservient to Tigranes.

== Wars against Roman and Parthian client kingdoms ==
Tigranes the Great's Armenian Empire: Countries, composing parts of the Empire

...At first he had served as a hostage among the Parthians; then by their means he returned to his country, in compensation for which service they obtained seventy valleys in Armenia. When he acquired power, he recovered these valleys, and devastated the country of the Parthians, the territory about Ninus, and that about Arbela.

— Strabo, Geographica

After the death of Mithridates II of Parthia his son Gotarzes I succeeded him. This was disputed by Sinatruces which caused a Parthian civil war. Tigranes, with Rome involved in a Social War and Parthia involved in a succession dispute, quickly invaded Cappadocia but was forced out by the Roman consul Sulla. Between 88 and 85 BC, he retook Adiabene, Gordyene, and Media Atropatene.

In 83 BC, after bloody strife for the throne of Syria, governed by the Seleucids, the Syrians decided to choose Tigranes as the protector of their kingdom and offered him the crown of Syria. Magadates was appointed as his governor in Antioch. He then conquered Phoenicia and Cilicia, effectively putting an end to the last remnants of the Seleucid Empire, though a few holdout cities appear to have recognized the shadowy boy-king Seleucus VII Philometor as the legitimate king during his reign. The southern border of his domain reached as far as Ptolemais (modern Akko). Many of the inhabitants of conquered cities were sent to his new metropolis of Tigranocerta.

At its height, his empire extended from the Pontic Alps (in modern north-eastern Turkey) to Mesopotamia, and from the Caspian Sea to the Mediterranean. A series of victories led him to assume the Achaemenid title of King of Kings, which was contemporaneously being used by the Parthian kings, appearing on coins struck after 85 BC. He was called "Tigranes the Great" by many Western historians and writers, such as Plutarch. The "King of Kings" never appeared in public without having four kings attending him. Cicero, referring to his success in the east, said that he "made the Republic of Rome tremble before the prowess of his arms."

...For though he had started on his career with small and insignificant expectations, he had subdued many nations, humbled the Parthian power as no man before him had done, and filled Mesopotamia with Greeks whom he removed in great numbers from Cilicia and from Cappadocia, and settled anew. He also removed from their wonted haunts the nomadic Arabians, and brought them to an adjacent settlement, that he might employ them in trade and commerce.Many were the kings who waited upon him, and four, whom he always had about him like attendants or body-guards, would run on foot by their master's side when he rode out, clad in short blouses, and when he sat transacting business, would stand by with their arms crossed.

— Plutarch, The Life of Lucullus

Gabriele Boccaccini proposed that the "Nebuchadnezzar" of the Book of Judith of the Old Testament is a veiled portrayal of Tigranes, and that the book reflects Jewish fear of his 69 BCE advance on Ptolemais and Queen Salome Alexandra's appeasement of him.

== Wars against Rome ==
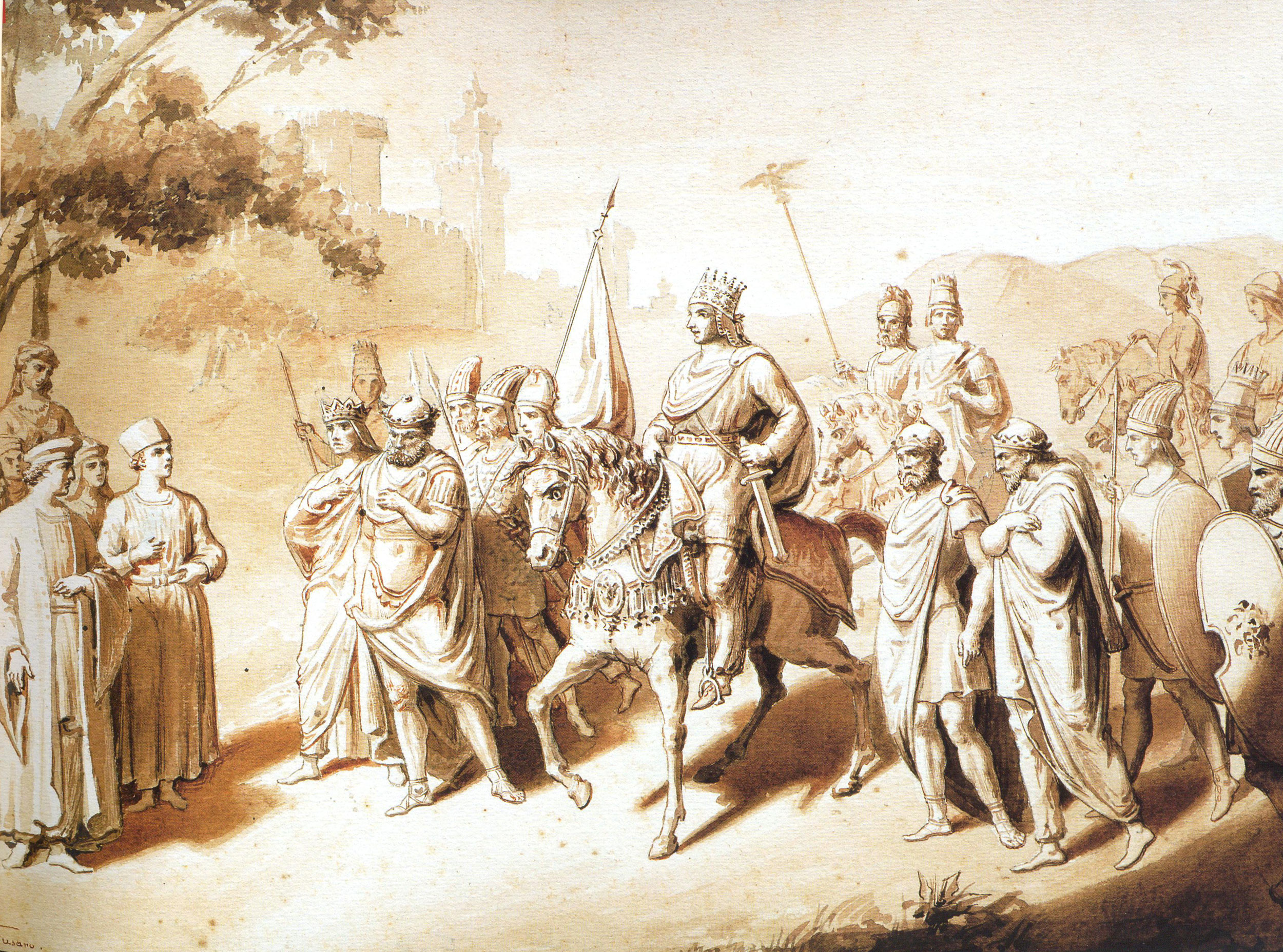
A 19th-century illustration of Tigranes with four vassal kings

Mithridates VI of Pontus had found refuge in Armenian land after confronting Rome, considering the fact that Tigranes was his ally and relative. The King of Kings eventually came into direct contact with Rome. The Roman commander, Lucullus, demanded the expulsion of Mithridates from Armenia – to comply with such a demand would be, in effect, to accept the status of vassal to Rome and thus Tigranes refused. Charles Rollin, in his Ancient History, says:

Tigranes, to whom Lucullus had sent an ambassador, though of no great power in the beginning of his reign, had enlarged it so much by a series of successes, of which there are few examples, that he was commonly surnamed "King of Kings." After having overthrown and almost ruined the family of the kings, successors of the great Seleucus; after having very often humbled the pride of the Parthians, transported whole cities of Greeks into Media, conquered all Syria and Palestine, and given laws to the Arabians called Scenites, he reigned with an authority respected by all the princes of Asia. The people paid him honors after the manners of the East, even to adoration.

Lucullus' reaction was an attack that was so precipitate that he took Tigranes by surprise. According to Roman historians Mithrobazanes, one of Tigranes' generals, told Tigranes of the Roman approach. Tigranes was, according to Keaveney, so impressed by Mithrobazanes' courage that he appointed Mithrobazanes to command an army against Lucullus – Tigranes sent Mithrobarzanes with 2,000 to 3,000 cavalry to expel the invader. Mithrobarzanes charged the Romans while they were setting up their camp, but was met by a 3,500-strong sentry force and his horsemen were routed. He perished in the attempt. After this defeat, Tigranes withdrew north to Armenia to regroup, leaving Lucullus free to besiege Tigranocerta.

When Tigranes had gathered a large army, he returned to confront Lucullus. On October 6, 69 BC, Tigranes' much larger force was decisively defeated by the Roman army under Lucullus in the Battle of Tigranocerta. Tigranes' treatment of the inhabitants (the majority of the population had been forced to move to the city) led disgruntled city guards to open the gates of the city to the Romans. Learning of this, Tigranes hurriedly sent 6000 cavalrymen to the city in order to rescue his wives and some of his assets. Tigranes escaped capture with a small escort.

On October 6, 68 BC, the Romans approached the old capital of Artaxata. Tigranes' and Mithridates' combined Armeno-Pontic army of 70,000 men formed up to face them but were resoundingly defeated. Once again, both Mithridates and Tigranes evaded capture by the victorious Romans.

The long campaigning and hardships that Lucullus' troops had endured for years, combined with a perceived lack of reward in the form of plunder, led to successive mutinies among the legions in 68–67. Frustrated by the rough terrain of Northern Armenia and seeing the worsening morale of his troops, Lucullus moved back south and put Nisibis under siege. Tigranes concluded (wrongly) that Nisibis would hold out and sought to regain those parts of Armenia that the Romans had captured. Despite his continuous success in battle, Lucullus could still not capture either one of the monarchs. With Lucullus' troops now refusing to obey his commands, but agreeing to defend positions from attack, the Senate sent Pompey to recall Lucullus to Rome and take over his command.

== Pompey and submission to Rome ==
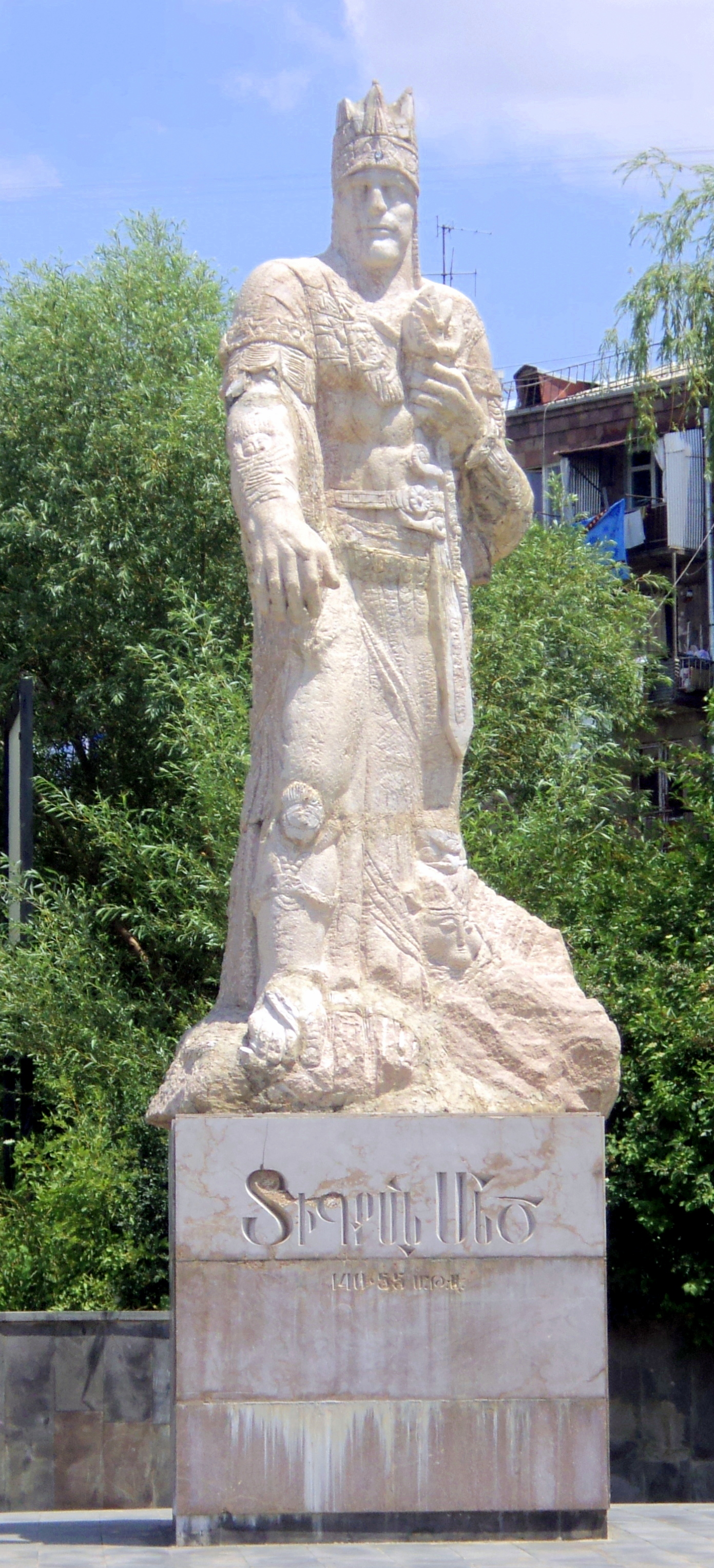
A modern statue of Tigranes in Yerevan

In 67 BC Pompey was given the task of defeating Mithridates and Tigranes. Pompey first concentrated on attacking Mithridates while distracting Tigranes by engineering a Parthian attack on Gordyene. Phraates III, the Parthian king, was soon persuaded to take things a little further than an annexation of Gordyene when a son of Tigranes (also named Tigranes) went to join the Parthians and persuaded Phraates to invade Armenia in an attempt to replace the elder Tigranes with the Tigranes the Younger. Tigranes decided not to meet the invasion in the field but instead ensured that his capital, Artaxata, was well defended and withdrew to the hill country. Phraates soon realized that Artaxata would not fall without a protracted siege, the time for which he could not spare due to his fear of plots at home. Once Phraates left, Tigranes came back down from the hills and drove his son from Armenia. The son then fled to Pompey.

In 66 BC, Pompey advanced into Armenia with Tigranes the Younger, and Tigranes, now almost 75 years old, surrendered. Pompey allowed him to retain his kingdom shorn of his conquests as he planned to have Armenia as a buffer state and he took 6,000 talents/180 tonnes of silver. His unfaithful son was sent back to Rome as a prisoner.

Tigranes continued to rule Armenia as a client-king of Rome. He died in 55/54, at age 85. He is mentioned in Macrobii, a Roman essay detailing the famous long-livers of the day attributed to Lucian.

== Issue ==
Tigranes had four sons and three daughters. The eldest son, Zariadres, according to Appian and Valerius Maximus rebelled against Tigranes and was killed during a battle (possibly late 90s BCE). Appian also mentions an unnamed younger son who was executed for conspiring against Tigranes: he disregarded his father's health and wore Tigranes's crown (Tigranes having been injured during a hunting accident). His third son, Tigranes the Younger, who showed great care for his injured father and was rewarded for his loyalty, has already been mentioned. He is also alleged to have led a military campaign in 82 BCE. Tigranes was succeeded by his fourth and youngest son, Artavasdes II.

One daughter of Tigranes according to Cassius Dio married Mithridates I of Atropatene. Another daughter married Parthian prince Pacorus, son of Orodes II. Parchments of Avroman also mention his third daughter, Ariazate "Automa", who married Gotarzes I of Parthia.

Although Cleopatra of Pontus is usually considered to be their mother (Appian writes that she gave birth to three sons), historian Gagik Sargsyan considered only Artavasdes II and one of the unnamed daughters to be her children. According to him, the rest had a different mother and were born before Tigranes became king. The reasoning behind it is that if Tigranes the Younger did indeed lead a campaign in 82 BCE, then he and hence his two older brothers (and possibly two sisters) would be too old to be Cleopatra's children. Another argument supporting this claim would be the situation with Ariazate. As she was probably the mother of Orodes I (r. 80–75 BC), then Ariazate could not have been the daughter of Cleopatra who married Tigranes only in 94 BCE at the age of 15 or 16. Sargsyan also proposed a possible candidate as Tigranes's first wife and the children's mother: Artaxiad princess Zaruhi, a daughter of Tigranes's paternal uncle Zariadres and granddaughter of Artaxias I. He also considered likely that the reason for the rebellion of Tigranes's son Zariadres was the birth of Artavasdes who was declared the heir by virtue of being born to a king and not a prince.

== Imperial ideology and coinage ==
Various Tigranes coins at the History Museum of Armenia in Yerevan

Tigranes is a typical example of the mixed culture of his period blending Iranian and Hellenistic influences. Like the majority Armenia's inhabitants, Tigranes was a follower of Zoroastrianism. (Note: The largest expansion took place during the reign of Tigran (II) the Great, who ruled between 95 and 55 bce and whose empire at one time stretched from the Mediterranean to the Caspian Sea...The court ceremonial was Achaemenid, containing also Parthian elements. However, perhaps due to the influence of the queen, Cleopatra of Pontus, there were Greek rhetoricians and philosophers at court..[..]..At court Greek may have been spoken; Tigran's heir Artawazd II wrote his plays and other literary works, which were still known in the second century ce...Tigran's religion was probably Mazdaism, a variety of Zoroastrianism.") The ceremonial of his court was of Achaemenid origin, and also incorporated Parthian aspects. He had Greek rhetoricians and philosophers in his court, possibly as a result of the influence of his queen, Cleopatra. Greek was also possibly spoken in the court. Following the example of the Parthians, Tigranes adopted the title of Philhellene ("friend of the Greeks"). The layout of his capital Tigranocerta was a blend of Greek and Iranian architecture. Nina Garsoïan argued that his Greek-speaking court, the Hellenistic capital of Tigranocerta, and handsome coinage marked the "high-water mark of Hellenic influence in Armenia."

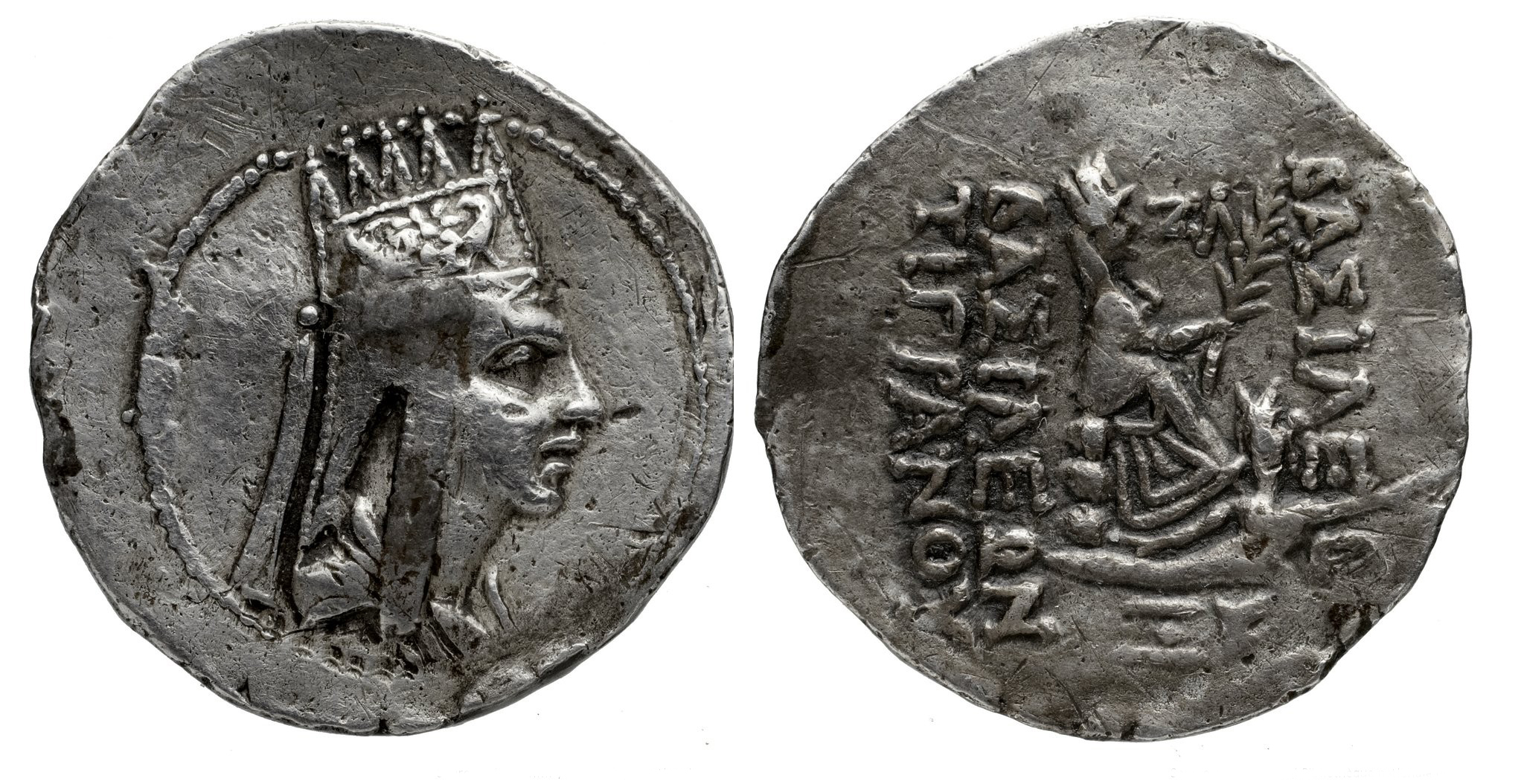
A tetradrachm of Tigranes found in Artaxata

The coins of Tigranes are the most notable from Armenia; even described as having emerged as "one of the icons of Armenian identity." His coinage has been widely admired by numismatists and historians, (Note: "remarkable, both as examples of costume and execution"; "well executed, and bear fine portraits"; "magnificent coinage"; "fine tetradrachms"; "handsome coinage"; "splendid tetradrachmas") and regarded as "the finest ever struck by an Armenian monarch". They illustrate the two major sources of Armenian cultures of his time: Iranian and Greek.

His coins adhere to the pattern set by the successors of Alexander the Great, and are where the first impact of Hellenistic art appears in Armenia. Dickran Kouymjian found "the exceptionally fine engraving" of Tigranes's portrait reflective of "direct classical inspiration". The observe depicts him in profile, turned right. His "striking portrait" depicts the king "clean shaven according to Greek taste". The king bears a "determined, strong face" wearing a high tiara with broad flaps, which has come to be known as the Armenian tiara. Gisela Richter linked his portrait to the style of the Roman Republican period.

On his crown, a pair of birds flank a star. The star of divinity and the birds of prey are both Iranian aspects, with the latter associated with the Zoroastrian concept of khvarenah (kingly glory) and possibly also a symbol of the bird of the Zoroastrian deity Verethragna.

Tigranes' chief mint was in Antioch, with silver tetradrachms minted there replacing the issues of the Seleucid Empire. The reverse of the coins minted at Antioch shows the Tyche of Antioch by the sculptor Eutychides; the earliest to do so. The goddess is seated on a rock as the river god Orontes swims at her feet. Tigranes may have "selected the Antiochene statue to underscore his accomplishment in conquering the famous metropolis." He also struck coins in Artaxata, Tigranocerta, and a limited number in Damascus.

His title King of Kings is linked by Adrienne Mayor, along his victories, also to the appearance of Halley's Comet during his reign, as depicted on the rare series of Tigranes's coins.

== Legacy and recognition ==
=== Historical assessment ===
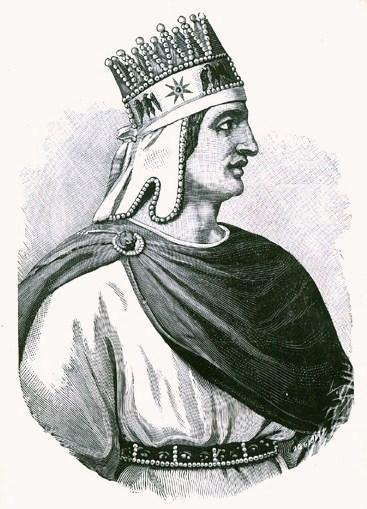
A late 19th century depiction of Tigranes based on his coinage

Tigranes has long been recognized as the greatest of Armenian monarchs. At its peak, his empire covered a territory of 900,000 km^{2} (350,000 sq mi) with a multi-ethnic population estimated at ten million. (Note: Earlier estimates by Jacques de Morgan, Isaac Don Levine and Bodil Biørn put it considerably higher, at 25 and 30 million.) He is the sole ruler in history under whom the entire Armenian plateau (and all Armenian-inhabited lands) was unified under a single native ruler. (Note: George Bournoutian: "the sole Armenian monarch who not only succeeded in unifying all the lands inhabited by the Armenians") Robert H. Hewsen noted, however, that he did not add Lesser Armenia to his kingdom, which remained under the control of Mithradates. The preeminent early Armenian historian Movses Khorenatsi called him the "most powerful and intelligent and the most valiant" of all Armenian kings. "He was supreme among men and by showing his valor he glorified our nation."

In Armenian folk tradition, he was identified with the Iranian hero Fereydun (Thraetaona), the slayer of the dragon Azhi Dahaka. James R. Russell suggests that an extensive Armenian heroic epic about Tigran once existed with scattered fragments preserved in later literature. He argues that the historical core of the epic fused two different Armenian kings named Tigran into one legendary hero, Tigranes the Great and the older Orontid-era Tigran associated with Cyrus and the fall of Media. Russell maintains that enough survives to show that Armenia once possessed a sophisticated national epic centered on Tigran as warrior, king, and near-messianic figure.

Compared to Mithridates Eupator, Tigranes was marginalized by Roman sources. In one exception, Velleius Paterculus (2.33.1) introduced Tigranes as "the most important of the kings" (regum maximum). Western scholarship has largely adopted the Roman bias against Tigranes. Théodore Reinach considered Tigranes a coward and an opportunist. On the contrary, René Grousset praised him as "a great yet underrated monarch who undoubtedly deserves much more admiration from history" than Mithridates, who brought about the downfall of his empire, while "Tigranes ensured the survival of his people for eternity." Theo van Lint argued that while he was not able to consolidate his territorial gains, the forty year peace he established had the "important effect of developing Greater Armenia and the network of clan relationships that would prove crucial for the preservation of Armenian identity in subsequent periods." Vahan Hovhannisyan similarly argued that he turned the Armenian people into a nation, which "survived for 500 years with the momentum he provided."

Nicholas Adontz saw Tigranes as one of the most accomplished rulers of the East. The historian Leo believed that while he established complete national independence, Tigranes behaved like an "Asian despot" and "arrogance blinded him." Leo was dismissive of what he saw as the long-gone legacy of Tigranes, contrasting it with the persistent legacy of the Armenian alphabet invented by Mesrop Mashtots. Hewsen argued that his short-lived empire was "not all that historically significant" and found it "inappropriate to glorify the activities of an Armenian conqueror whose treatment of his subjects (e.g., deporting them by the thousands from their homes to populate his new capital) is considered to be reprehensible by Armenian historians when they see it inflicted upon the Armenians themselves."

=== Armenian nationalism ===
His empire is often popularly called "sea to sea Armenia" (Armenian: ծովից ծով Հայաստան, tsovits tsov Hayastan) as it extended from the Caspian to the Mediterranean Sea. He has been a source of pride for modern Armenian nationalists, with his "sea to sea" empire serving as an inspiration for the most maximalist claims of contemporary Armenian nationalism. George Bournoutian noted that Armenians "revere" Tigranes and sometimes "endow him with modern nationalistic traits and ignore the fact that Tigranes possessed a more Hellenistic and, occasionally, Persian, outlook, rather than that of a modern Armenian." Eric Hobsbawm suggested that modern Armenian nationalists, in an effort to find a "suitable (and suitably impressive) national state in the past", had to go back to the times of Tigranes in the first century BC, when the "last sufficiently important kingdom is to be found."

Tigranes was a key figure in the post-Soviet national revival. In the early 1990s, a major avenue in central Yerevan, previously called after the October Revolution was renamed after him. He is the only Armenian king to appear on the Armenian currency, specifically on the 500 dram banknote, which was in circulation from 1993 to 2005. During the First Nagorno-Karabakh War, a paramilitary volunteer unit led by Armenak Armenakyan and named after Tigran was active from 1989 to 1994. Another of the unit's commanders, Colonel Koryun Ghumashyan, founded a military preparatory boarding school named after Tigran in Armavir, Armenia in 1995. The Order of Tigran the Great, established in 2002, is awarded by the president of Armenia "for exceptional services" rendered to the state. Three statues of Tigranes have been erected in Armenia, including at the President's Residence (2000), in Yerevan's Nor Nork District (2004), and in the city of Vagharshapat (2016).

=== In European and Armenian culture ===
Tigranes appeared in European culture in the early modern period. He is portrayed in the 1619 English Renaissance drama A King and No King by Beaumont and Fletcher. Giovanni Gioseffo dal Sole depicted King Tigranes at the feet of Lucullus, an etching c. 1680. Approximately two dozen operas composed by Italian and German composers during the 18th century bear the title Tigrane; some were directly inspired by Tigranes the Great. The most notable are composed by Antonio Vivaldi (1724), Johann Adolph Hasse (1729), and Christoph Willibald Gluck (1743), with librettos by Pietro Antonio Bernardoni for the first and Francesco Silvani for the latter two.

In modern Armenian literature, Tigranes has been portrayed in a 1947 tragedy by Khachik Dashtents, a 1967 historical novel by Hayk Khachatryan, and a historical poem by Hovhannes Shiraz. A 1916 poem by the Armenophile Russian poet Valery Bryusov is dedicated to Tigranes as well.

In visual arts, Tigranes has been depicted by Yervand Kochar in 1940 (gouache on paper) and in a 1959 mural crafted by Van Khachatur inside the Matenadaran in Yerevan, symbolizing Armenia's Hellenistic period.

His portrait (from coinage) is depicted on 1988 Soviet and 2009 Armenian postage stamps.

== See also ==
- Ancient Kingdom of Armenia
- Military campaigns of Tigranes the Great
- List of people known as the Great
- History of Armenia
- Artaxiad dynasty

== Notes ==
Tigranes the Great Artaxiad Dynasty Born: 140 BC Died: 55 BC
Preceded by Tigranes I	King of Armenia; 95 BC – 55 BC	Succeeded by Artavasdes II
Preceded by Philip I Antiochus XII	King of Syria; 83 BC – 69 BC	Succeeded by Antiochus XIII
