= Armenian tiara =

Crown featured on ancient Armenian coinage

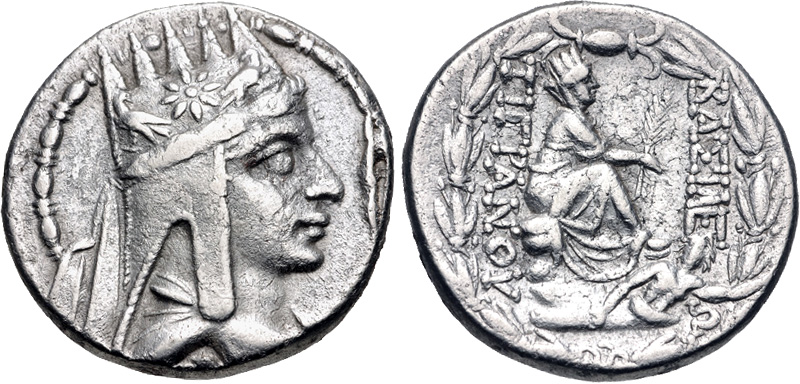
Coin of Tigranes the Great, Tigranocerta mint. Struck circa 80-68 BC.

In scholarship, the term Armenian tiara is used to refer to a spikey tiara that was characteristic of the coinage of Armenia during the Late Hellenistic period. It originated from the insignia used by the royal and satrapal authority in the Achaemenid Empire. The best known example was the one worn by the Artaxiad king of Armenia, Tigranes the Great (r. 95–55 BC).

The tiara was notably worn by Monobaz I, the king of Adiabene. It may have been done as part of propaganda to display that his kingdom had replaced Armenia as a regional power in the Near East.

Antiochus I of Commagene (r. 70–31 BC), the king of Commagene, adopted this tiara as an insignia of dominant power. The tiara, which he calls a kitaris, was seen by him as a manifestation of the Persian and Orontid legacies.

== Sources ==
- Canepa, Matthew (2018). The Iranian Expanse: Transforming Royal Identity Through Architecture, Landscape, and the Built Environment, 550 BCE–642 CE. Oakland: University of California Press. ISBN 9780520379206.
- Marciak, Michał; Wójcikowski, R. (2016). "Images of Kings of Adiabene: Numismatic and Sculptural Evidence". Iraq. IX. Cambridge University Press: 79–101. doi:10.1017/irq.2016.8.
