= Catherine Steel =

Catherine Elizabeth Wannan Steel, FBA (born 31 May 1973) is a British classical scholar. She is Professor of Classics at the University of Glasgow. Steel is an expert on the Roman Republic, the writings of Cicero, and Roman oratory.

She studied in Corpus Christi College, Oxford and was awarded the First Craven scholarship in 1993, and then the Chancellor's Prize for Latin Prose in 1994. She was elected to a Senior Scholarship in 1997. She received her PhD from Oxford in 1999.

Steel was elected as a Fellow of the British Academy (FBA) in 2022.

In 2004, she participated in the BBC Radio 4 In Our Time episode on the Roman Republic. She participated in a further episode of In Our Time, in January 2018, on Cicero. Her book Cicero, Rhetoric and Empire is held in 1062 libraries worldwide.

== Selected publications ==
- Community and Communication: Oratory and Politics in Republican Rome. Oxford University Press, 2013. (Edited with Henriette van der Blom) ISBN 9780199641895
- The Cambridge Companion to Cicero (Cambridge: Cambridge University Press, 2013)
- The End of the Roman Republic, 146-44 B.C.: Conquest and Crisis. Series: Edinburgh history of Ancient Rome, 3. Edinburgh University Press: Edinburgh, 2013. ISBN 9780748619443
- Roman Oratory. Series: New surveys in the classics. Cambridge University Press, 2006. ISBN 0521687225
- Reading Cicero: Genre and Performance in Late Republican Rome, 2005. Duckworth. ISBN 0715632795
- Cicero, Rhetoric and Empire. Oxford University Press, 2002. ISBN 0199248478
