= Armenian Numismatic Society =

The Armenian Numismatic Society is an educational nonprofit organization based in California. It was established in 1971 and remains the only organization devoted to Armenian numismatics.
