= Magadates =

Magadates (Ancient Greek: Μαγαδάτης) was a general serving under Tigranes the Great, king of Armenia. In 83 B.C., after Tigranes defeated Antiochus X Eusebes, he brought under his control all the Syrian territories west of the Euphrates, extending his dominion as far as Egypt, and also conquered Cilicia; all these lands had previously belonged to the Seleucid kingdom, and he appointed Magadates as governor over them. Magadates ruled until 69 B.C., when he left to assist Tigranes against the Roman general Lucullus. Taking advantage of his absence, Antiochus XIII, son of Antiochus X, entered Syria and assumed authority over the government with the acquiescence of the populace.
