= Nebuchadnezzar (disambiguation) =

Nebuchadnezzar II (r. 605–562 BC) is famous for his appearances in the Hebrew Bible.

Nebuchadnezzar (Nabû-kudurri-uṣur) or Nebuchadrezzar may also refer to:

== Kings of Babylon ==
- Nebuchadnezzar I (r. c. 1125 – 1104 BC), known for his victory over Elam and the recovery of the Statue of Marduk
- Nebuchadnezzar III (r. 522 BC), originally named Nidintu-Bêl, rebel against Darius I of Persia
- Nebuchadnezzar IV (r. 521 BC), originally named Arakha, rebel against Darius I of Persia

== Other uses ==
- Nebuchadnezzar (governor of Uruk) - a governor of the city Uruk in the 640s BC, possibly ancestor of the later Nebuchadnezzar II
- Nebuchadnezzar (wine), a bottle that holds 15 litres of wine
- Nebuchadnezzar (Blake), a 1795 print by William Blake
- Nebuchadnezzar (video game), a 2021 city-building game
- Nebuchadnezzar (The Matrix), the name of Morpheus' vessel in the science fiction films The Matrix, The Matrix Reloaded and The Matrix Revolutions
- Nebuchadnezzar, an opera created by rapper Kanye West.
