= Battle of Tigranocerta =

69 BC battle between Rome and Armenia

- Part of the Third Mithridatic War
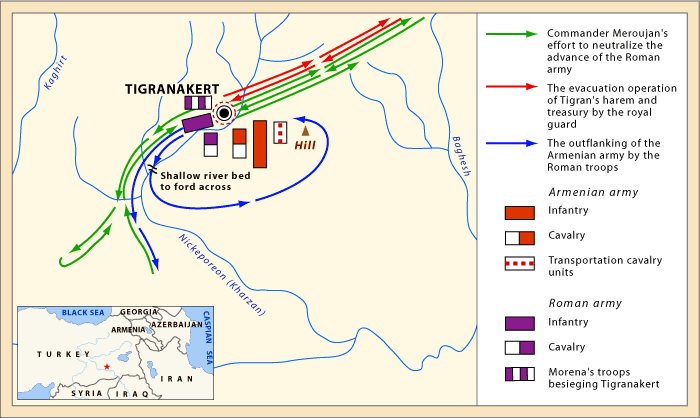
Date	6 October 69 BC
Location	Tigranocerta, Armenia (modern-day Silvan, Diyarbakır, Turkey) 38.1422°N 41.0014°E
Result	Roman victory

Belligerents
Roman Republic	Kingdom of Armenia

Commanders and leaders
Lucullus; Legatus Fannius; Legatus Sextilius; Legatus Hadrianus	Tigranes the Great; Taxiles; Mancaeus; Mithrobarzanes

Strength
11,000–40,000 men: 10,000–24,000 infantry; 1,000–3,300 Roman cavalry; 10,000 Galatian, Thracian and Bithynian infantry and cavalry	70,000–100,000 men: Adiabenians, Corduenians, Iberians, Medians; 20,000–25,000 Armenians

Casualties and losses
Unknown, estimated light	Unknown, estimates given from 10,000 to 100,000 5,000 killed 5,000 captured

The Battle of Tigranocerta (Armenian: Տիգրանակերտի ճակատամարտ, Tigranakerti tchakatamart) was fought on 6 October 69 BC between the forces of the Roman Republic and the army of the Kingdom of Armenia led by King Tigranes the Great. The Roman force, led by Consul Lucius Licinius Lucullus, defeated Tigranes, and as a result, captured Tigranes' capital city of Tigranocerta.

The battle arose from the Third Mithridatic War being fought between the Roman Republic and Mithridates VI of Pontus, whose daughter Cleopatra was married to Tigranes. Mithridates fled to seek shelter with his son-in-law, and Rome invaded the Kingdom of Armenia. Having laid siege to Tigranocerta, the Roman forces fell back behind a nearby river when the large Armenian army approached. Feigning retreat, the Romans crossed at a ford and fell on the right flank of the Armenian army. After the Romans defeated the Armenian cataphracts, the balance of Tigranes' army, which was mostly made up of raw levies and peasant troops from his extensive empire, panicked and fled, and the Romans remained in charge of the field.

== Background ==
Tigranes' expansion into the Near East led to the creation of an Armenian empire that stretched almost across the entire region. With his father-in-law and ally securing the empire's western flank, Tigranes was able to conquer territories in Parthia and Mesopotamia and annex the lands of the Levant. In Syria, he began the construction of the city of Tigranocerta (also written Tigranakert), which he named after himself, and imported a multitude of peoples, including Arabs, Greeks, and Jews, to populate it. The city soon became the king's headquarters in Syria and flourished as a great centre for Hellenistic culture, complete with theatres, parks and hunting grounds.

This period of Armenian hegemony in the region, however, was coming close to an end with a series of Roman victories in the Roman–Mithridatic Wars. Friction between the two had existed for several decades, although it was during the Third Mithridatic War that the Roman armies under Lucullus made significant progress against Mithridates, forcing him to take refuge with Tigranes. Lucullus sent an ambassador named Appius Claudius to Antioch to demand that Tigranes surrender his father-in-law; should he refuse, Armenia would face war with Rome. Tigranes refused Appius Claudius' demands, stating that he would prepare for war against the Republic.

Lucullus was astonished upon hearing this in the year 70, and he began to prepare for an immediate invasion of Armenia. Although he had no mandate from the Senate to authorize such a move, he attempted to justify his invasion by distinguishing as his enemy king Tigranes and not his subjects. In the summer of 69, he marched his troops across Cappodocia and the Euphrates river and entered the Armenian province of Tsop'k', where Tigranocerta was located.

== Siege of Tigranocerta ==
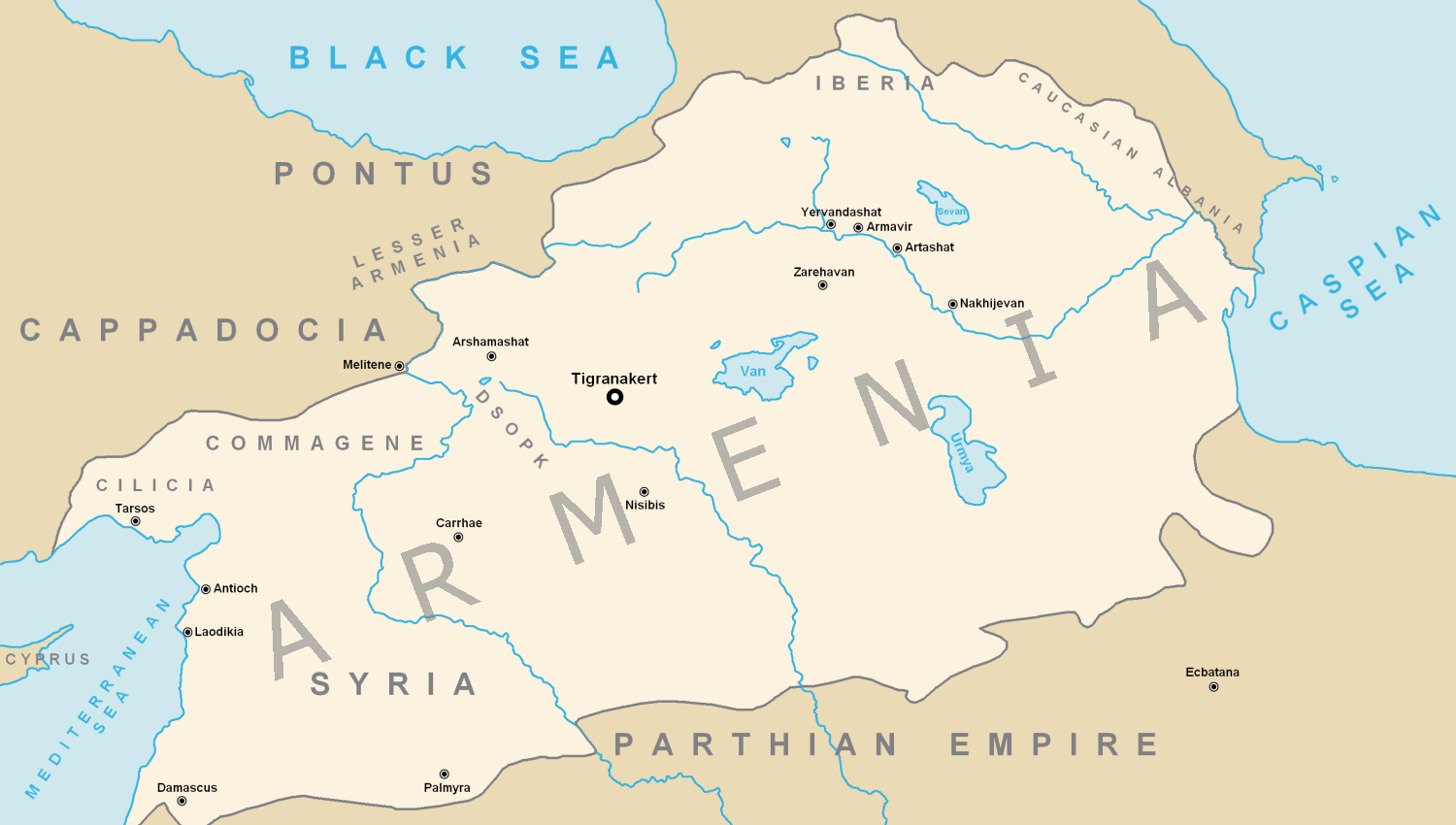
Tigranes the Great's empire circa 80 BC

Tigranes, who was residing at Tigranocerta in the summer of 69, was not only astonished by the speed of Lucullus' rapid advance into Armenia but by the fact that he had even launched such an operation in the first place. Unable to reconcile with this reality for a certain period of time, he belatedly sent a general named Mithrobarzanes with 2,000–3,000 cavalrymen to slow down Lucullus' advance, but his forces were cut to pieces and routed by the 1,600 cavalry led by Sextilius, one of the legates serving under Lucullus. Learning of Mithrobarzanes' defeat, Tigranes entrusted the defence of his namesake city to Mancaeus and left to recruit a fighting force in the Taurus Mountains. Lucullus' legates were able to disrupt two separate detachments coming to the aid of Tigranes, and even located and engaged the king's forces in a canyon in the Taurus. Lucullus chose not to pursue Tigranes while he had an unimpeded path towards Tigranocerta; he advanced and began to lay siege to it.

Tigranocerta was still an unfinished city when Lucullus laid siege to it in the late summer of 69. The city was heavily fortified and according to the Greek historian Appian, had thick and towering walls that stood 25 meters high, providing a formidable defence against a prolonged siege.The Roman siege engines that were employed at Tigranocerta were effectively repelled by the defenders by the use of naphtha, making Tigranocerta, according to one scholar, the site of "perhaps the world's first use of chemical warfare."

However, since Tigranes had forcibly removed many of its inhabitants from their native lands and brought them to Tigranocerta, their allegiance to the king was cast into doubt. They soon proved their unreliability: when Tigranes and his army appeared on a hill overlooking the city, the inhabitants "greeted his [Lucullus] appearance with shouts and din, and standing on the walls, threateningly pointed out the Armenians to the Romans."

== Forces ==
Appian claims that Lucullus had embarked from Rome with only a single legion; upon entering Anatolia to make war against Mithridates, he added four more legions to his army. The overall size of this force consisted of 30,000 infantry and 1,600 cavalry. Following Mithridates' retreat to Armenia, Appian estimates Lucullus' invading force to be only two legions and 500 horsemen, although it is highly improbable that he would have undertaken the invasion of Armenia with such a small army. Plutarch gave 16,000 heavy infantry and 1,000 cavalry, slingers and archers for the Romans at Tigranocerta. Of these, 6,000 heavy infantry did not participate in the battle. Eutropius put the Roman army at 18,000 men. Historian Adrian Sherwin-White places the size of Lucullus' force at 12,000 veteran legionaries (three understrength legions), and 4,000 provincial cavalry and light infantry. The Roman army was further bolstered by several thousand allied Galatian, Thracian, and Bithynian infantry and cavalry, giving it a possible strength of 40,000.

Tigranes' army clearly held a numerical superiority over that of Lucullus'. According to Appian, it numbered 250,000 infantry and 50,000 cavalry. According to Plutarch, Lucullus stated in a letter to the senate to have fought 20,000 slingers and archers, 55,000 cavalry, including 17,000 armoured with mail, 150,000 heavy infantry and 35,000 non-combatants for a total of 225,000 soldiers and 35,000 non-combatants. Eutropius went further, claiming 600,000 Armenian cataphracts and 100,000 infantry. Memnon of Heraclea gave a more modest 80,000 infantry and cavalry. Phlegon of Tralles says Tigranes had 70,000 men, including 30,000 cavalry and 40,000 infantry. Many scholars, however, doubt these figures accurately reflect the true number of Tigranes' army and believe they are highly inflated. Some historians, most notably Plutarch, wrote that Tigranes considered Lucullus' army far too small, and upon seeing it, is quoted as saying "If they come as ambassadors, they are too many; if they are soldiers, too few," although some consider this line apocryphal. In 1985, Ruben Manaserian estimated Tigranes' army at 80,000–100,000 men. Tigranes also possessed several thousand cataphracts, formidable heavily armoured cavalry that were clad in mail armour and armed with lances, spears or bows.

== Disposition and engagement ==
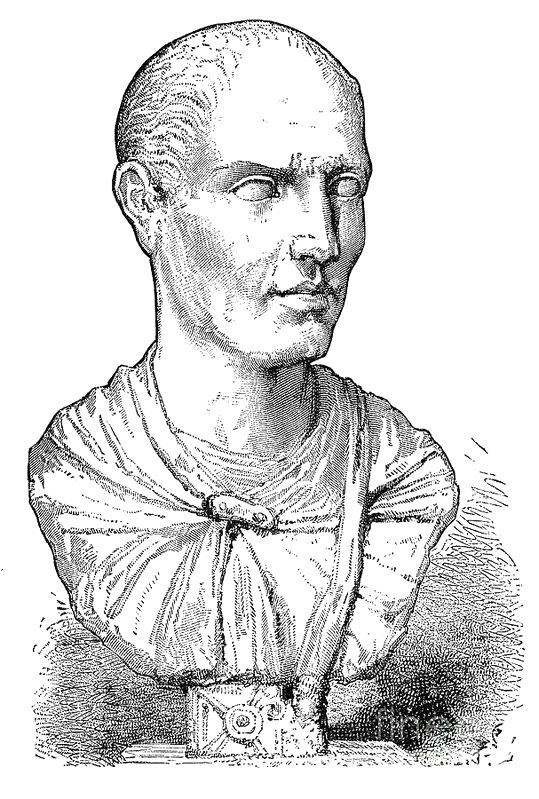
The commander of the Roman Senate army, Lucius Licinius Lucullus.

The two armies converged toward the Batman-Su river slightly to the south-west of Tigranocerta. (Note: The precise location of the battle has remained a source of dispute. Appian and Plutarch remark that the battlefield was close enough for the garrison commander of Tigranocerta to make out the figures of the armies; however, according to T. Rice Holmes, the site of the battlefield was roughly sixteen miles to the southwest of the city. Holmes restricts the location of the battle to three contemporary sites: Arzen, Farkin, and Tell Ermen. See T. Rice Holmes, "Tigranocerta." Journal of Roman Studies 8 (1917): pp. 136–138. For a more recent and detailed analysis, see the articles by Thomas A. Sinclair, "The Site of Tigranocerta. I," Revue des Études Arméniennes 25 (1994–95): pp. 183–254; idem, "The Site of Tigranocerta. II," Revue des Études Arméniennes 26 (1996–97): 51–117.)

Tigranes' army was positioned on the east bank of the river while Lucullus, who had left a rear guard of 6,000 heavy infantry under Murena to continue the siege of the city, met the Armenian army on the river's west bank. The Armenian army was formed of three sections. Two of Tigranes' vassal kings led the left and right flanks, while Tigranes led his cataphracts in the centre. The rest of his army stood in front of a hill, a position Lucullus soon exploited.

Roman troops at first attempted to dissuade Lucullus from engaging in battle, since October 6 marked the day of the disastrous battle of Arausio, where the general Quintus Servilius Caepio and his Roman army were defeated by the Germanic Cimbri and Teuton tribes. Ignoring his troops' superstitious beliefs, Lucullus is said to have responded, "Verily, I will make this day, too, a lucky one for the Romans."

Cowan and Hook suggest that Lucullus would have deployed the Romans in a simplex acies, that is to say a single line, so making the frontage of the army as wide as possible as a counter to the cavalry. He took several of his troops downriver, where the river was the easiest to ford, and at one point, Tigranes believed that this move meant Lucullus was withdrawing from the battlefield. (Note: One of Mithirdates' commanders, Taxilés, who accompanied Tigranes, informed the Armenian king that, "When these men are merely on the march, they do not put on gleaming armour, nor have their shields polished and helmets uncovered as they have now, taken the leather covers from their armour. No, this splendor means they are going to fight, and are now advancing on their enemies." Quoted in Cowan and Hook. Roman Battle Tactics, p. 42.)

Lucullus had initially decided to make a running charge with his infantry, a Roman military tactic that minimized the amount of time an enemy could utilize its archers and sling infantry prior to close combat engagement. However, he decided against this at the last moment when he realized that the Armenian cataphracts posed the greatest threat to his men, ordering instead a diversionary attack with his Gallic and Thracian cavalry against the cataphracts.

With the cataphracts' attention fixed elsewhere, Lucullus formed two cohorts into maniples and then ordered them to ford the river. His objective was to outflank Tigranes' cataphracts by circling counterclockwise around the hill and attacking them from the rear.

Lucullus personally led the charge on foot and upon reaching the top of the hill, he yelled to his soldiers in an effort to buoy their morale: "The day is ours, the day is ours, my fellow soldiers!" With this, he gave special instructions to the cohorts to attack the horses' legs and thighs, since these were the only areas of the cataphracts which were not armoured. Lucullus charged downhill with his cohorts and his orders soon proved decisive: the lumbering cataphracts were caught by surprise and, in their attempts to break free from their attackers, careered into the ranks of their own men as the lines began to collapse.

The infantry, which was also made up of many non-Armenians, began to break ranks and confusion spread to the rest of the body of Tigranes' army. While the great king himself took to flight with his baggage train northwards, the entire line of his army gave way.

== Aftermath and legacy ==
With no army left to defend Tigranocerta, and a foreign populace that gleefully opened the gates to the Romans, Lucullus' army began the wholesale looting and plunder of the city. The city was burned. The king's treasury, estimated to be worth 8,000 talents, was looted and each soldier in the army was awarded 800 drachma. The battle also resulted in severe territorial losses: most of the lands in Tigranes' empire to the south of the Taurus fell under the sway of Rome.

Despite the heavy losses Tigranes suffered, the battle did not end the war. In retreating northwards, Tigranes and Mithridates were able to elude Lucullus' forces, though losing again against the Romans during the Battle of Artashat. In 68, Lucullus' forces began to mutiny, longing to return home, and he withdrew them from Armenia the following year.

The battle is highlighted by many historians specifically because Lucullus overcame the numerical odds facing his army. The Italian philosopher Niccolò Machiavelli remarked upon the battle in his book, The Art of War, where he criticised Tigranes' heavy reliance on his cavalry over his infantry.

=== Casualties ===
The casualties reported for Tigranes' army are immense, with estimates given from 10,000 to as many as 100,000 men. Phlegon counted 5,000 dead and 5,000 captured. Orosius gave 30,000 losses, while Plutarch upped them to 100,000 infantry slain and the entire cavalry force wiped out save for a handful.

Plutarch says that on the Roman side, "only a hundred were wounded, and only five killed," although such low figures are highly unrealistic. Cowan and Hook, while considering these losses ridiculous, think it is clear that the battle was won with disproportionate losses.
