= Tigranocerta =

Coordinates: 38.1422°N 41.0014°E

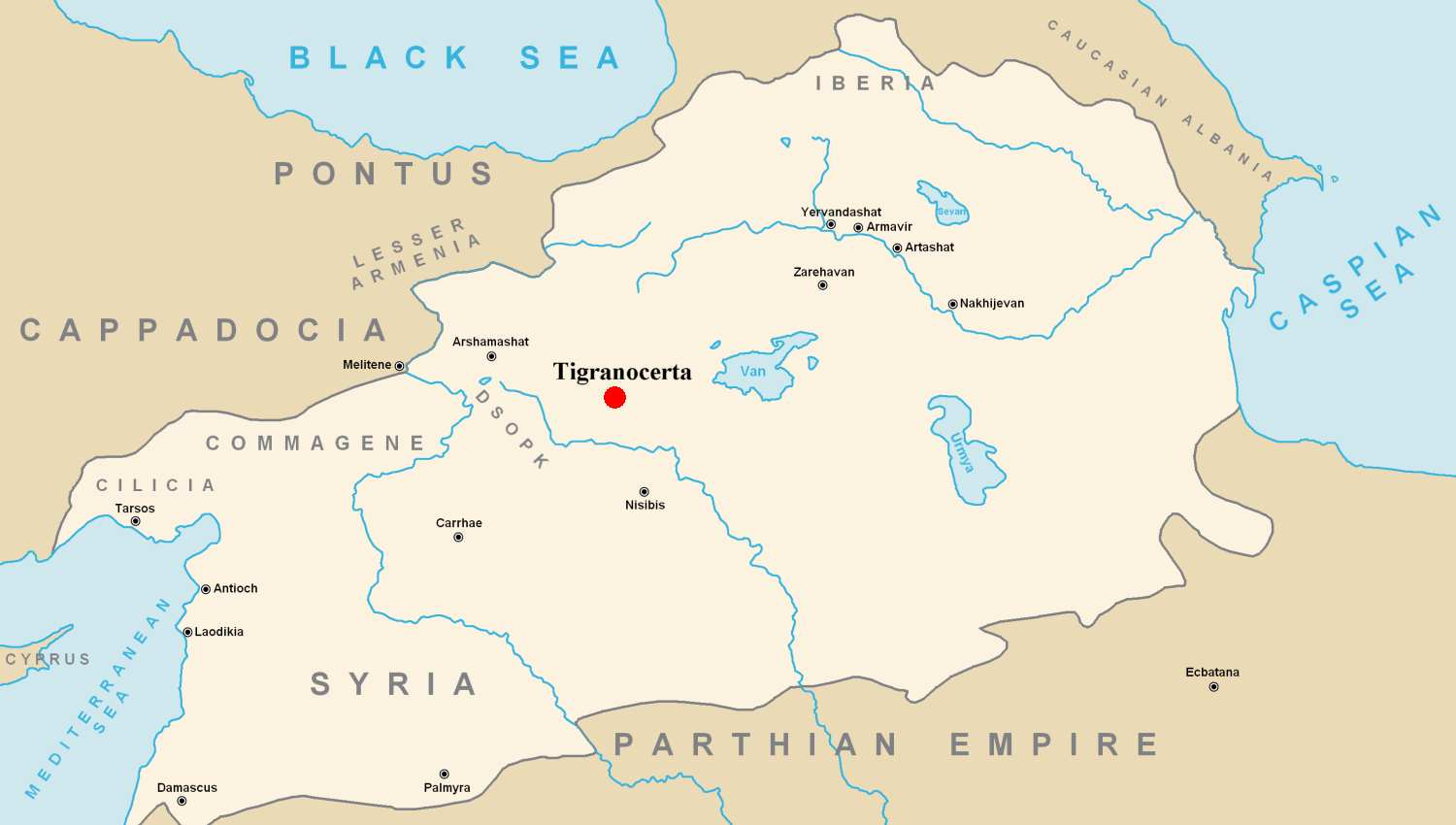
- Kingdom of Armenia
- Interactive map of Tigranocerta
- Periods: Hellenistic period
- Location: Arzanene Province, Kingdom of Armenia (near Diyarbakır, Turkey)

History
- Built: 83–78 BC
- Built by: Tigranes the Great

Tigranocerta (Greek: Τιγρανόκερτα, romanized: Tigranokerta, Armenian: Տիգրանակերտ, romanized: Tigranakert), also called Cholimma or Chlomaron in late antiquity, was a city and the capital of the Armenian Kingdom between 77 and 69 BCE. It bore the name of Tigranes the Great (Tigranes II), who founded the city in the first century BC. There is no common agreement on the precise location of Tigranocerta; it was either near present-day Silvan, or Arzan (Arzn, in the Armenian province of Arzanene or Aghdznik), east of Diyarbakır, Turkey, or in the valley of the Garzan river as mentioned by T. A. Sinclair It was one of four cities in historic Armenia named Tigranakert; the others were in Nakhichevan, Artsakh, and Utik.

Its population has been estimated at up to 100,000, "over a quarter of a million", possibly 300,000, or even 500,000. These are partly or entirely based on Appian, who in the Mithridatic War attests that Tigranes carried 300,000 people from Cappadocia to Tigranocerta. Many scholars cite the number without critical examination, while Thomas Sinclair found it exaggerated.

== Foundation ==
Tigranes the Great, being a bearer of Hellenistic culture, founded eponymous cities during his reign. Four cities named Tigranakert and three named Tigranavan are known. Tigranes' new conquests stretched from the Caspian Sea to southern Syria. The former capital, Artashat (founded by Artashes I), had become isolated from the main trade routes and lay in the eastern corner of the vast empire. This compelled the Armenian king to build a new, more centrally located capital.

In the 70s BCE, when Greater Armenia was at its peak of power, Tigranes founded the city and named it after himself. The city was built on a strategic location along the trade routes connecting Mesopotamia, the East, and the West. The Royal Road from Susa to Sardis passed to the south, linking Tigranocerta to major commercial networks.

To populate the capital, Tigranes forcibly relocated the urban population of conquered countries to Armenia. According to Appian, 300,000 people were transferred from Cappadocia alone. Approximately 100,000 more were brought from 12 cities of Cilicia. Many scholars cite these figures without critical examination, while Thomas Sinclair considered them exaggerated. The total population relocated has been estimated at up to half a million, settled in Tigranocerta, Artashat, Armavir, Yervandashat, Van, and other cities. Strabo writes:

"The Armenian king Tigranes, during his campaigns in Cappadocia, put the Jews in a difficult situation; the king expelled all the Mazakians to Mesopotamia, forming the population of Tigranocerta with them. Later, after the capture of Tigranocerta, those who were able returned to their homeland".

== Structure and layout ==
Tigranocerta was a Hellenistic-style city, designed to impress and to serve as a commercial and cultural hub. The city was surrounded by walls 50 cubits high (approximately 25 meters). Inside these walls, warehouses, armories, and stables were built. According to Tacitus:

"A city that had many defenders and strong walls. Besides, a fairly wide river, the Nikephorios, flows through part of the city's fortifications".

The city had a citadel (acropolis) and eight gates. One known gate was Arzan, meaning "Gate of Burials", located in the southern part of the city. According to tradition, the names of Emperor Constantine and his mother Helena were written on the facades of all the towers and gates of the city of Maruban.

The magnificent palace of Tigranes the Great was located outside the city, amidst gardens and flower beds. The Royal Avenue leading to Artashat via Manazkert and Zarehavan began at Tigranocerta. It connected to the valley of the Aratsani River via a road through the mountainous regions of Nerdzhik and Shenik.

Unlike the sprawling slave-owning cities of the ancient East (Babylon, Nineveh), Tigranocerta occupied a relatively small area relative to its large population. This was because most inhabitants were engaged in crafts and trade, not agriculture. Lucullus was able to surround the populous city with relatively few troops, indicating its compact layout.

== Population and demographics ==
The population of Tigranocerta has been estimated variously. Modern estimates range from 100,000 to over 250,000, possibly 300,000, or even 500,000. These figures derive largely from Appian's account of the 300,000 Cappadocians resettled there. The population was ethnically diverse, including Armenians, Cappadocians, Cilicians, Syrians, Jews, and others forcibly relocated or attracted by trade.

== Economy and culture ==
The city's markets were filled with traders and merchants from all over the ancient world. Tigranocerta quickly became a very important commercial and cultural center of the Near East. The majority of the population was engaged in crafts and trade; agriculture was likely practiced on a small scale.

=== Theater of Tigranocerta ===
The oldest record of the existence of Armenian theater is associated with the theater of Tigranocerta. Tigranes gathered skilled specialists in crafts and arts from various countries, including actors, and built a theater building. It was a Hellenistic-type theater with a Greek-speaking troupe. The repertoire consisted of works by Greek playwrights.

Plutarch wrote that Tigranocerta was "a rich and beautiful city where every common man and every man of rank studied to adorn it". The Hellenistic culture during the Artaxiad dynasty had a strong influence, and Greek was the official language of the court.

== History ==
=== Background and creation ===
Tigranes II ascended the throne of Greater Armenia around 95 BCE. Through a series of campaigns, he expanded his kingdom into a vast empire. To administer this empire, he divided Greater Armenia into four major strategic regions or viceroyalties. The new capital, Tigranocerta, was founded in the 70s BCE as the administrative and commercial heart of this empire.

=== The Battle of Tigranocerta (69 BCE) ===
In the summer of 69 BCE, the Roman general Lucius Licinius Lucullus invaded Armenia. He crossed the Euphrates and entered the Aghdznik province, where Tigranocerta was located. Tigranes was in Palestine at the time and was taken by surprise. He sent a general, Mithrbarzanes, with 2,000–3,000 soldiers to halt the Romans, but they were defeated.

Lucullus besieged the city. Tigranes gathered a large army – according to Plutarch, about 80,000 men – and approached the city. The battle took place near the Nikephoria River, with a low hill about 750 meters away. The besieged inhabitants could see the Armenian army and pointed out its positions to the Romans.

Lucullus left a force of 6,000 men under Murena to continue the siege, and with the rest (10,000 infantry, 3,000 cavalry, 1,000 light-armed) advanced against Tigranes. Lucullus sent his cavalry from the front while he himself bypassed the enemy's rear with the infantry, attacking the baggage train from a hill. The blow of the legions to the flanks of the ethnically mixed Armenian army led to its defeat. The Armenian heavy cavalry (cataphracts) could not fight effectively in the confined space and were forced to retreat.

=== Destruction and sack ===
On October 6, 69 BCE, Tigranocerta fell to Lucullus. The gates were opened by captive Cappadocians who had been resettled there. The Romans plundered the city, sending many of the inhabitants back to their original homes. Statues and temples were destroyed, and the city was set on fire. An abundant quantity of gold and silver was carried off to Rome as war booty. Lucullus melted down statues, pots, cups, and precious stones to extract the metals. The newly built theater building was also destroyed. Most of the city's inhabitants fled to the countryside. The great city would never recover from this devastating destruction.

After these setbacks, Tigranes did not waver. In winter, he organized a general mobilization, replenishing the army with 105,000 Armenian peasants. With the help of Mithridates Eupator, he reorganized the army, focusing on strengthening the cavalry. In the summer of 68 BCE, military operations moved deep into Armenia, towards Artashat.

=== Post-Tigranes Period ===
After Tigranes the Great, Tigranocerta never regained its status as a capital. The political center of Armenia shifted back to the Ayrarat province (Vagharshapat, Dvin, later Ani). The periodic wars between Rome and Persia, for which northern Mesopotamia and southwestern Armenia became a theater, further devastated the city. In 387 CE, when Armenia was divided between Rome and Persia, Tigranocerta lay on the border, on the Roman side. It became a mere fortress-city with a garrison.

During the Roman–Parthian War of 58–63 CE, Tigranocerta was again taken by the Romans under the command of Corbulo.

=== Late Antiquity and Medieval Period ===
In late antiquity, Tigranocerta was commonly referred to as Chlomaron (or Cholimma), which may have been another name or the name of a larger settlement nearby. In 587 CE, during the reign of Emperor Maurice, Chlomaron and much of Armenia came under Roman administration after the Romans defeated the Sasanian Persian Empire at the Battle of the Blarathon.

In the 7th–9th centuries, under Arab rule, Tigranocerta – by then called Muafarkin (or Farkin) – experienced a partial revival as the administrative center of a large region. However, being on the border between the Caliphate and Byzantium, it remained a fortress-city and was periodically destroyed. By the 12th century, it had declined into an insignificant settlement. No systematic excavations have been carried out at the ruins of Tigranocerta.

=== Ottoman Period ===
During the Ottoman period, Armenians referred to the city of Diyarbekir (ancient Amida) as Dikranagerd (the Western Armenian pronunciation of Tigranakert). This reflects the transfer of the historic name to a different location. The region remained a center of Armenian culture and settlement up until the Armenian Genocide in the late 19th – early 20th centuries, when the local Armenian population was exterminated, assimilated, or driven out by Kurds and Turks.

== Legacy and modern identification ==
The precise location of Tigranocerta is still debated among scholars. Candidates include:

1. Near present-day Silvan (east of Diyarbakır) – supported by many historians.
2. Arzan (Arzn) – in the Armenian province of Arzanene.
3. The valley of the Garzan river – proposed by T. A. Sinclair based on archaeological surveys.

The ruins of the capital Tigranakert are said to be located near the modern village of Manufarkin, about 60 km northeast of Diyarbekir, at the southern foot of the Sasna Mountains.

== See also ==
- Battle of Tigranocerta
- Tigranes the Great
- Artaxata
- Kingdom of Armenia (antiquity)
